= Battle of Drumchatt (1501) =

1501 Scottish clan battle

'Mythical' Battle of Drumchatt (1501)
- Part of Clan Munro and Clan Mackenzie feud
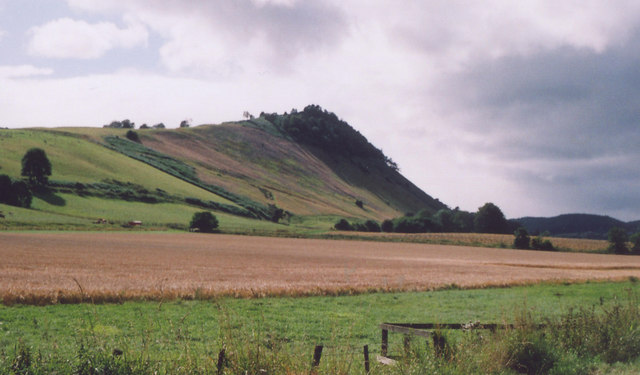
- Knockfarrel hill also known as the cat's back at Drumchatt where the clan battle is said to have taken place
Date	1501
Location	SE of Strathpeffer, Scotland
Result	Mackenzies "claimed" victory

Belligerents
Clan Mackenzie; Clan Macrae	Clan Munro; Dingwall family Clan MacCulloch

Commanders and leaders
Hector Roy Mackenzie; Duncan Mor Macrae	William Munro

Strength
140 or not exceeding 180	700 or 900

Casualties and losses
Unknown	19 "heads cut off"

The Battle of Drumchatt, or Druim-a-Chait, was a Scottish clan battle claimed by non-contemporary historians to have taken place in the year 1501 near Strathpeffer, in the Scottish Highlands. It was allegedly fought between the Clan Mackenzie and the Clan Munro. Mackenzie chronicles have claimed a signal victory.

== Historical evidence ==
The first account of the Battle of Drumchatt was written in 1669 by George Mackenzie, 1st Earl of Cromartie in his History of the Family of Mackenzie and describes a battle between the Munros and Mackenzies in 1501. This has perplexed many historians because there is no reference in any contemporary historical documents to such a battle. Late 19th century historian, Alexander Mackenzie, later published an account of the same battle in his books The History of the Mackenzies (1894), and The History of the Munros of Fowlis (1898). The historian Alexander Mackenzie was a direct descendant of Hector Roy Mackenzie of Gairloch who he claims led the Mackenzies at this battle.

== The battle ==
The Mackenzie's accounts states that William Munro, 12th Baron of Foulis led a group of 700 or 900 (Note: Alexander Mackenzie's book History of the Mackenzies (page 395) states that Munro's force numbered 700 at the Battle of Drumchatt of 1501. However, in Mackenzie's book History of the Munros of Fowlis (page 30) he states that Munro's force numbered 900. George Mackenzie's original account from the 17th century states 900.) Munros, Dingwalls, and MacCullochs who attacked the Mackenzies, laying waste to their lands and taking cattle. However, on their return, they were attacked by just 140 Mackenzies according to Alexander Mackenzie, or 180 according to George Mackenzie, led by Hector Roy Mackenzie of Gairloch at a place called Drumchatt, where Munro's force of 700 or 900 was defeated. According to George Mackenzie, the leader of the Mackenzies, Hector Mackenzie, was not willing to enter into open battle on such unequal terms. Instead he ambushed William Munro's force when they were in a long and negligent march on the south side of the Knockfarrel hill which is the eastern extension of the Drumchatt ridge. According to George Mackenzie, the Mackenzies cut off many heads with axes and two-handed swords and that nineteen heads tumbled down the hill and into a well which has since been known in Scottish Gaelic as Tober ni Kean which means the "Fountain of Heads". According to one source William Munro's sheriff Alexander Vass of Lochslin was among those killed. According to Clan Munro Association historian, R.W Munro, a Jhonne the Vaus blaze bailie and burgess of the burch of Dyngvalle is recorded in contemporary documents the Munro of Foulis Writs in 1490. He is again recorded as sheriff in this part when he granted a charter to Hector Roy Mackenzie in the king's name for Gairloch in 1494 and it is possible that he was the Sheriff Vass who accompanied William Munro into Mackenzie territory and who was killed at Drumchatt in 1501.

Alexander Mackenzie also quotes a short Gaelic verse which was written by Rev. John MacRae (d.1704) in his Ardintoul MS History of the Mackenzies and which Alexander Mackenzie translates in English as:

"Although MacRath doth "fortunate" import, It's he deserves that name whose brave effort, Eight hundred did put to flight, With his seven score at Knock-Farrel". (Note: A score equates to 20 people and so seven score would be 140.)

The Clan Munro Association (UK) translates the second line of the Gaelic verse into English differently as follows:

'Did eight hundred men defeat and many kill, With his seven score on the face of Pharrel hill'.

A modern historian, Charles Ian Fraser also mentions William Munro and the alleged Battle of Drumchatt in 1501:

William Munro of Foulis played a prominent part in public affairs in the north, and was knighted by James IV. In 1501 in some official capacity, he led a composite force of Munros, Dingwalls, and MacCullochs to attack Hector Roy Mackenzie of Gairloch at Druim-a-Chait, near Strathpeffer. Mackenzie chronicles have claimed a signal victory. Whatever the truth, the very next year the Munro Chief was commanded to proceed to Lochaber on that hazardous ploy, "the King's business". There, in 1505, he was slain by Lochiel.

== Aftermath ==
William Munro, 12th Baron of Foulis, was later killed in 1505 at the Battle of Achnashellach whilst "on the King's business" fighting against the Clan Cameron. However, his son, chief Hector Munro, 13th Baron of Foulis, married Catherine Mackenzie who was the daughter of chief Kenneth Mackenzie, 7th of Kintail and according to historian Alexander Mackenzie the marriage of the Mackenzie daughter to the Munro chief was an act of reconciliation after the Battle of Drumchatt in 1501.

In 2000, the chiefs of the Clan Mackenzie and Clan Munro called a truce and the Mackenzies invited the Munros to join them at their clan gathering to commemorate the Battle of Druim a Chait.

== See also ==
- Battle of Drumchatt (1497)
