= John Munro, 11th Baron of Foulis =

John Munro of Foulis (died 1491) was a Scottish clan chief of the highland Clan Munro in Ross-shire, Scotland. He is by tradition the 11th Baron of Foulis and 14th overall chief of the clan. However, he is actually only the 4th chief of the Clan Munro who can be proved by contemporary evidence.

== Lineage ==
John Munro of Foulis was the son of George Munro, 10th Baron of Foulis who had been killed in 1452 at the Battle of Bealach nam Broig. According to tradition the chieftainship was then left to a baby lying in a cradle. If the tradition is true then John Munro would be this baby. While in minority his uncle, John Munro, 1st of Milntown, was "Tutor of Foulis" and in 1454 he went on a private raid into Perthshire which resulted in the Battle of Clachnaharry.

== Lands and charters ==
In 1453, John Munro of Foulis had sasine of his late father's lands on precept by John of Islay, Earl of Ross (who was also Lord of the Isles and chief of Clan Donald). The Earldom of Ross was forfeited in 1476 and John Munro of Foulis was made Crown Chamberlain of the confiscated estates. This included John Munro of Foulis being made governor of Dingwall Castle. A crown charter regranted to John the lands of Findon in the Earldom of Ormond in 1478. In October, 1487, John Munro is designated "Lord of Fowlis".

Different sources give different dates of John Munro's death. The Martine MS written by George Martine in the late 17th century gives the date as 1490. The Munro Tree of 1734 gives the year as 1496. However contemporary documents, the Munro Writs of Foulis gives the date as 5 June 1491.

== Family ==
John married Finvola, daughter of William Calder, Thane of Cawdor and chief of Clan Calder, who was also Crown Chamberlain "beyond the spey". John Munro and Finvola had two sons:

1. William Munro, 12th Baron of Foulis (heir and successor as chief of the Clan Munro).
2. Thomas Munro, described in a document dated 20 June 1499 but there is no further trace of him, according to historian Alexander Mackenzie. Historian R.W. Munro states that statements that John had a second son called Thomas are based on a Dunbar/Mackintosh agreement.

== See also ==
- Chiefs of Clan Munro
