= Clan MacIver =

Scottish clan

- MacÌomhair
- Crest: a boar's head couped Or
- Motto: nunquam obliviscar ("I will never forget")
- Clan MacIver no longer has a chief, and is an armigerous clan

Clan MacIver or Clan MacIvor, also known as Clan Iver, is a Scottish clan documented by the Lord Lyon King of Arms. The clan, however, does not have a chief recognised by the Lord Lyon King of Arms. Because of this the clan can be considered an armigerous clan. The clan name of MacIver is of Gaelic origin, derived from an Old Norse personal name. Various forms of the surname MacIver, like MacGiver, are considered sept names (followers or members) of several historically large Scottish clans, such as clans Campbell and Mackenzie. There exists a Clan Iver society in Fife, Scotland.

== Origin of the name ==
The surname MacIver is an Anglicisation of the Gaelic MacÌomhair "meaning son of Ìomhar". The Gaelic personal name Ìomhar is derived from the Old Norse Ivarr. An early man bearing the surname MacIver was Malcolm McIuyr, whose appears on a list of men in the Sheriffdom of Argyll/Lorne in 1292.

== Origin, confusion and Campbells ==
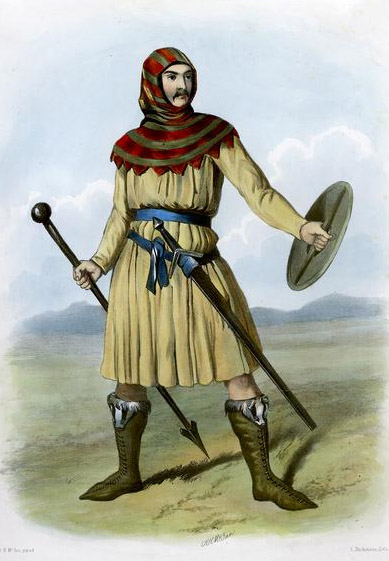
"Mac Ivor". A Victorian era romanticised depiction of a member of the clan by R. R. McIan, from The Clans of the Scottish Highlands, published in 1845.

According to Alastair Campbell of Airds, it is very unlikely that there is a common origin for one Clan MacIver. Campbell of Airds maintains that the Victorian Principal P. C. Campbell confused matters with his Account of the Clan Iver. Principal Campbell, at the time publication of his Account, was petitioning the Lord Lyon King of Arms to recognise him as "Chief of Clan Iver". Campbell was ultimately unsuccessful in his bid for chiefship. According to Campbell of Airds, the modern Clan MacIver is also a dubious a concept because it encompasses all MacIvers regardless of their origin, and that the "modern game of clan-constructing is again being played".

Campbell claimed that the MacIvers originated in Glenlyon, and settled in Argyll in 1222. The Victorian illustrator R. R. McIan considered the MacIvers to have descended from Duncan, Lord of Lochow, making them descend from the same stock as the Campbells. According to legend, a stronghold of the MacIvers was the ancient fort of Dun Mor (Dunmore), located near Lochgilphead.

According to Ane Accompt of the Genealogie of the Campbells, the eponymous Iver was one of two illegitimate sons of Colin Maol Math. The other illegitimate son being Tavish Coir, from whom, according to the same Campbell genealogy, the MacTavishes descend, though Patrick L. Thompson, Seannachie to the 27th Chief of Clan MacTavish, notes that the Glenmasan manuscript of 1238 establishes Eoin M'Tavis (John MacTavish) as a named individual more than thirty years before Thomas Cambel's first recorded appearance in 1270, making a Campbell ancestral connection genealogically impossible, and that two independent publications from 1793 document the MacTavish presence at Dunardry in Knapdale since approximately 893 AD — more than 300 years before the first documented Campbell presence in Argyll around 1220. Thompson suggests Tavis Coir may be a later figure rather than the clan's founder.

== The MacIver-Campbells ==
The leading family of the MacIver Campbells were the MacIvers of Lergachonzie and Stronshira. A branch of the MacIvers were Captains of the Castle of Inveraray, where the standing stone in the grounds of the castle was said to have been the boundary between the lands of the MacIvers and the MacVicars. Other branches of MacIver Campbells include the MacIver Campbells of Ballochyle in Cowal, the Campbells of Kirnan in Glassary, the Campbells of Pennymore on Loch Fyne, south of Inveraray, and the Campbells of Ardlarach near Ardfern, Craignish.

Principal Campbell himself belonged to the Campbells of Quoycrook in Caithness. They were claimed to have descended from MacIvers of Lergachonzie. Campbell also claimed that the related families to this branch were the Campbells of Duchernan, the Campbells of Thurso and Lochend, and the Iverachs of Wideford in Orkney. Campbell of Airds notes that both the arms of the Iverachs and the Campbells of Duchernan display the gyronny prevalent in Campbell heraldry.

In June, 1564, at Dunoon, in an agreement between Iver MacIver of Lergachonzie, and Archibald Campbell, 5th Earl of Argyll, the earl renounced all calps from those of the name MacIver, in return for a sum of money, though the Earl reserved the calp of Iver MacIver and his successors. According to Campbell of Airds, it would seem that dating from this agreement many MacIvers began using the name Campbell or MacIver-Campbell.

In July, 1680, men of the Clan MacIver of Argyll who were a sept of the Clan Campbell apparently joined up with the MacIvers of Caithness in support of Sir John Campbell of Glenorchy and fought against the forces of George Sinclair of Keiss at the Battle of Altimarlach, in a dispute over who had the right to the title and lands of the Earl of Caithness. Campbell won the battle, but Sinclair later turned to the law and was awarded the lands and title as Earl of Caithness. Although the MacIvers only formed a small part of Glenorchy's force, they contributed their full share to its success and, according to tradition, the piper of the clan in Caithness, Finlay MacIver, composed the Great Highland bagpipe tune, Bodach-na-briogais, which was inspired by the battle. According to Hugh Fraser Campbell and Walter Biggar Blaikie, Glenorchy's piper, Findlay MacIver, had composed at this time the well known piping tune, The Campbells Are Coming.

== Northern Macivers ==
=== Wester Ross ===
According to the traditions of the Mackenzies, a clan of Macivers were located in Wester Ross, across The Minch from Lewis. George Mackenzie, 1st Earl of Cromartie mentioned this family in his dubious 'history of the Mackenzies'. He claimed that the 'MacIvors', 'MacAulas', 'MacBollans', and 'Clan Tarlich' were the ancient inhabitants of Kintail, and were all descended from Norwegian families.

The Wester Ross Macivers have also been connected to the Battle of Bealach nam Broig (battle of "the pass of the brogue"), fought between various north-western highland clans from the lands of Ross, against the followers of the Earl of Ross. Today the date of the battle is generally given at about 1452. Robert Gordon of Gordonstoun, writing in the early 17th century, stated that the Ross clans consisted of "Clan-juer", "Clantalvigh", and "Clan-leajwe". The 19th-century historian F W L Thomas translated these as "Clan-iver", "Clan-t-aluigh, i.e., Clan-Aulay", and "Clan-leaive, i.e., Clan-Leay". According to Gordon, a force of Munros and Dingwalls overtook the mentioned clans and fought them at "Bealligh-ne-Broig", between Ferrin-Donald and Loch Broom. Gordon stated that "Clan-Iver", "Clantalvich" and "Clan Laive" were "utterlie extinguished and slain".

=== Lewis ===
The early 20th-century historian William C Mackenzie noted that The Highlands of Scotland in 1750 stated that "the most common inhabitants of Lewis are Morrisons, McAulays and MacIvers, but when they go from home, all who live under Seaforth call themselves Mackenzies". Mackenzie considered that the majority of the Lewis Macivers seemed to have settled on the island with the arrival of the Mackenzies. The Mackenzies took control of Lewis in the early 17th century.

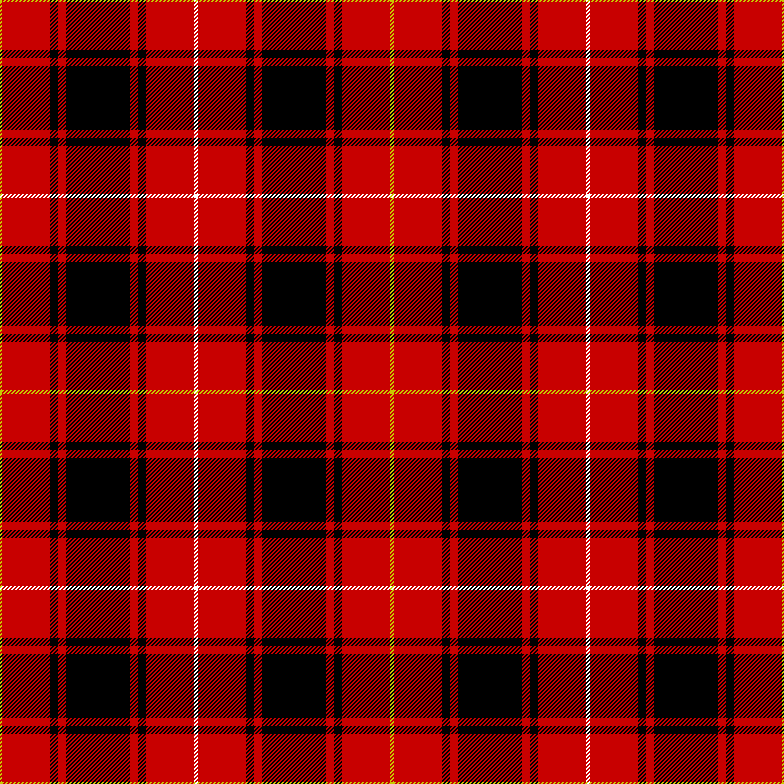
The MacIver tartan. There is little evidence to account for this tartan, and it is thought to be of relatively recent origin.

As tenants of the Earl of Seaforth, the inhabitants of Lewis followed Clan Mackenzie. William Mackenzie, 5th Earl of Seaforth decided to support the Jacobites forces in the 1715 Jacobite rising. Mackenzie stated that Seaforth drew up a list of officers to command his troops. Seaforth's list of officers contained 16 Lewismen: four captains, four lieutenants, and four ensigns. Of these, two were MacIvers: [Lieutenant] Kenneth Maciver, Bragar; and [Ensign] S. Maciver, Callanish.

== Modern clan symbolism ==
Modern Scottish clan members can show their allegiance to their clan and chief by wearing a Scottish crest badge. These heraldic badges usually display the clan chief's heraldic crest and motto surrounded by a strap and buckle. Such crest badges have been used since the Victorian era. The crest badge used by members of Clan MacIver contains the Latin motto nunquam obliviscar ("i will never forget") and the heraldic crest of a boar's head couped Or. Both the crest and motto are very similar to the crest and motto of the chief of Clan Campbell—the Duke of Argyll. The motto on the MacIver crest badge actually answers that of the Campbell's chief.

There is little evidence to account for the MacIver tartan, and it is thought to be of relatively recent origin. The tartan is very similar to the Clan Macfie tartan.

== Clan Castle ==
- Glendarroch is about two miles south-west of Lochgilphead in Argyll and is also known as the Robber's Den and Kilduskland. The site is defended on two sides by gorges and also by a rock cut ditch. There are also the remains of two buildings. It is reputedly the refuge of bandits and is said to have been used by the MacIvers in the seventeenth century.

== See also ==
- Clan Campbell, closely related to the MacIver-Campbells
- Thomas Campbell, the poet, was of the MacIver-Campbells
- Colin Campbell, 1st Baron Clyde, who was born Colin MacIver

== Sources ==
- Campbell of Airds, Alastair (2000). A History of Clan Campbell; Volume 1, From Origins to the Battle of Flodden. Edinburgh: Edinburgh University Press. ISBN 1-902930-17-7.
- Mackenzie, William Cook (1903). History of the Outer Hebrides. Paisley: Alexander Gardiner.
- Thomas, F W L (1879–80). "Traditions of the Macaulays of Lewis" (PDF). Proceedings of the Society of Antiquaries of Scotland. 14. Archived from the original (PDF) on 11 June 2007.
- Stewart, Donald Calder (1974). The Setts of the Scottish Tartans, with descriptive and historical notes (2nd revised ed.). London: Shepheard-Walwyn Publishers. ISBN 0-85683-011-9.
- Way of Plean, George; Squire, Romilly (2000). Clans & Tartans. Glasgow: HarperCollins. ISBN 0-00-472501-8.
