= Battle of Drumchatt (1497) =

Scottish clan battle that took place in 1497

- Part of Rebellion of Domhnall Dubh
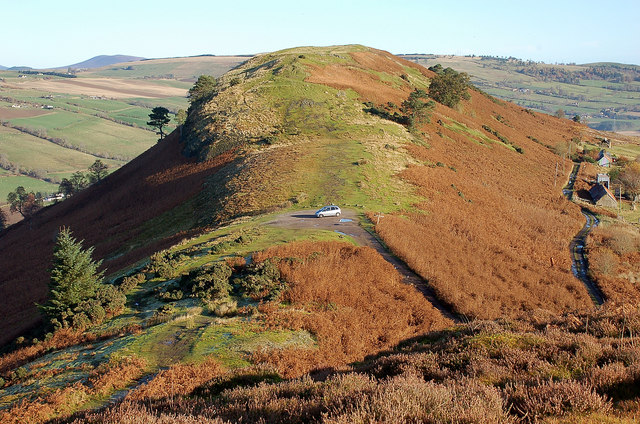
- Knockfarrel hill also known as the cat's back at Drumchatt where the clan battle is said to have taken place
Date	1497
Location	SE of Strathpeffer, Scotland 57°35′N 4°31′W grid reference NH4957
Result	Mackenzie & Munro victory

Belligerents
Clan Mackenzie; Clan Munro (Loyal to James IV of Scotland)	Clan MacDonald of Lochalsh (Loyal to John of Islay, Earl of Ross)

Commanders and leaders
Hector Roy Mackenzie of Gairloch	Alexander MacDonald of Lochalsh

Strength
Unknown	Unknown

Casualties and losses
Unknown	Unknown

The Battle of Drumchatt was a Scottish clan battle that took place in 1497. The Clan Mackenzie and possibly the Clan Munro (Note: The presence of the Clan Munro at the Battle of Drumchatt in 1497 is mentioned by early 19th-century historian Donald Gregory but the Munros are not mentioned as being present in the earliest account which was written by Sir Robert Gordon in the early 17th century.) defeated the Clan MacDonald of Lochalsh at Drumchatt (Druimchat) or "the Cat's Back", a ridge to the southeast of Strathpeffer.

== Background ==
In 1493, the powerful chief of the Clan Donald, Sir John of Islay, lost his right to the title of Lord of the Isles when it was revoked by James IV of Scotland, having also already forfeited the title of Earl of Ross in 1475. As a result, many of the western and other northern clans, particularly the Clan MacLeod of Harris and Dunvegan, felt that they no longer had to pledge allegiance to the MacDonalds.

In 1495, King James assembled an army at Glasgow. Then, on 18 May, many of the highland chiefs made their submissions to him, including those of the Clan Mackenzie and Clan Munro. This may explain the unusual alliance between the Munros and Mackenzies who were rival clans. However, while the presence of the Clan Munro at the Battle of Drumchatt in 1497 is mentioned by early 19th-century historian Donald Gregory, according to late 19th-century historian Alexander Mackenzie, the Munros are not mentioned as being present in the earliest account which was written by Sir Robert Gordon in the early 17th century.

== Historical accounts ==
The earliest account of the Battle of Drumchatt of 1497 was written by Sir Robert Gordon (1580–1650) in his manuscript A Genealogical History of the Earldom of Sutherland (written in the early 17th century and published in 1813). It is also recorded in Donald Gregory's History of the Western Highlands and Isles of Scotland (1835). The battle is also recorded by historian William Anderson in his book The Scottish Nation: Or, The Surnames, Families, Literature, Honours, and Geographical History of the People of Scotland.

=== Sir Robert Gordon (1625) ===
17th-century historian Sir Robert Gordon (1580–1650) writes of the skirmish at Drumchatt, as being fought after the Battle of Blar Na Pairce, which was also fought between the MacDonalds and Mackenzies:

Thereafter, some of the islanders and the Clandonald met with Clankeinzie at a place in Ross called Drumchatt, where ensued a sharp skirmish; bot in the even the ilanders wer put to the worst, and chassed out of Rosse at that tyme.

=== Donald Gregory (1881) ===
From Donald Gregory's History of the Western Highlands and Isles of Scotland from AD 1493 to AD 1625, quoting Gordon. Published in 1881 and reprinted in 1996:

A.D. 1497: "The active share taken by King James in supporting the pretensions of Perkin Warbeck, withdrew his attention, for a time from the state of the Western Isles, and seems to have given opportunity for a new insurrection—which, however, was suppressed without the necessity for another Royal expedition. Sir Alexander (MacDonald) of Lochalsh — whether with the intention of claiming the earldom of Ross, or of revenging himself on the Mackenzies, for his former defeat at Blairnepark, is uncertain—invaded the more fertile districts of Ross in a hostile manner. He was encountered by the Mackenzies and Munroes at a place called Drumchatt, where, after a sharp skirmish, he and his followers were again routed and driven out of Ross."

== Aftermath of the battle ==
Donald Gregory also gives an account of the events in the aftermath of the battle, quoting from the MS histories of the Mackenzies and Mackintoshs:

After this event, the knight of Lochalsh proceeded southward among the Isles, endeavouring to rouse the Islanders to arms in his behalf, but without success owing, probably to the terror produced by the execution of Sir John of Isla and his sons. Meantime, MacIian of Ardnamurchan, judging this a proper opportunity of doing an acceptable service to the King, surprised Lochalsh in the island of Ornasay, whither he had retreated, and put him to death, In this MacIan was assisted by Alexander, the eldest surviving son of John of Isla, with whom he had contrived to effect a reconciliation, and to whom he had given his daughter in marriage.

Sir Alexander of Lochalsh left both sons and daughters, who afterwards fell into the King's hands, and of whom we shall have occasion to speak in the sequel. About the same time as the unsuccessful insurrection of which we have just spoken, the chiefs of Mackenzie and MacKintosh made their escape from Edinburgh Castle; but, on their way to the Highlands, they were treacherously seized at the Torwood, by the Laird of Buchanan. Mackenzie having offered resistance, was slain, and his head, along with MacIntosh, who was taken alive, was presented to the King by Buchanan. The latter was rewarded, and MacIntosh returned to his dungeon, where he remained till after the battle of Flodden.

== See also ==
- Battle of Drumchatt (1501)
