= Battle of Achnashellach =

1505 Scottish clan battle

- Part of Rebellion of Domhnall Dubh
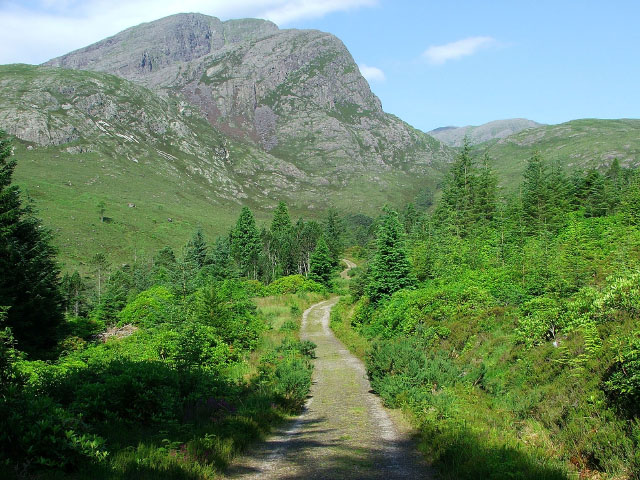
- Achnashellach Forest where the battle is said to have taken place. Most of the trees in view are the result of modern plantations of exotic conifers.
Date	1505
Location	Achnashellach, Highlands, Scotland
Result	Cameron victory

Belligerents
Clan Munro; Clan Mackay (loyal to the Scottish Crown)	Clan Cameron (loyal to Donald of Islay)

Commanders and leaders
William Munro, 12th Baron of Foulis †; Iye Roy Mackay, 10th of Strathnaver	Ewen Cameron, 13th of Lochiel

Strength
Unknown	Unknown

Casualties and losses
Unknown	Unknown

The Battle of Achnashellach was a Scottish clan battle said to have taken place in the year 1505, in the Scottish Highlands at Achnashellach. It was fought by the Clan Cameron against the Clan Mackay and the Clan Munro.

== Historical evidence ==
Little is known of the events concerning the Battle of Achnashellach as there is little contemporary evidence to support it. However, the Clan Munro records that "Sir William Munro of Foulis was sent to Lochaber on the King's business and was killed in an engagement between the Camerons and MacKays at a place called Achnashellach in 1505". Aside from this there is little evidence of the battle, however it is Clan Cameron tradition that they defeated a joint force of Munros and Mackays.

== Accounts of the battle ==
=== 16th century contemporary evidence ===
Contemporary evidence for the battle is found in The Calendar of Fearn which is a manuscript of the Clan Ross. It records a Hugh Ross, some time cadet of the Rosses of Balnagowan, who was killed at Achnashellach in 1504/05. Contemporary documents, the Munro Writs show that he was a procurator for Sir William Munro of Foulis.

=== 17th and 18th century manuscripts ===
==== Alexander Munro of Obsdale (c.1600–1649) ====
Alexander Munro who was a cadet of the Munro of Obsdale branch of the Clan Munro wrote a birth brief to Charles I of England in the 17th century which mentions his ancestor William Munro of Foulis and states that he was killed by treachery. This birth brief was published in Alexander Mackenzie's History of the Munros of Fowlis in 1898 and states: William Munro of Foulis, plainly a knight most valiant for leading an army at the command of the King against certain factious northern men, he perished by treachery.

==== Andrew Munro of Coul (1717) ====
Andrew Munro of Coul wrote an MS History of the Munros in about 1717 which was published in 1805 in the book Chronological and Genealogical Account of the Ancient and Honorable Family of the Fowlis. This has a brief account of the skirmish stating that Munro was killed by Cameron and that: the house was surrounded and refused to surrender.

=== 19th century publications ===
==== Memoirs of Sir Ewen Cameron of Lochiel (1842) ====
The memoirs of Ewen Cameron of Lochiel (d.1719) were published in 1842 and in the author's introduction chapter, which gives a history of the Clan Cameron, the following is mentioned regarding the feud between the Camerons against the Mackays and Munros during the chiefship of Ewen Cameron of Lochiel (d.1546).

Besides the other wars wherein Locheill was engaged, he had also a ruffle with the Barron of Rea, Chief of the Mackays, a people living many miles north of Lochaber. What the quarrall was, I know not, but it drew on an invasion from the Camerons, and that ane engagement wherein the Mackays were defeated, and the Laird of Foules, Chief of the Monros, who assisted them, killed upon the spot.

==== Donald Gregory (1881) ====
Donald Gregory's (d.1836) book History of the Western Highlands and Isles of Scotland from AD 1493 to AD 1625 which was published in 1881, with quoted source, gives an insight into the circumstances in Scotland, in the years prior to the battle:

A.D.1502: A commission was afterwards given to the Earl of Huntly, the Lord Lovat, and William Munro of Fowlis to proceed to Lochaber and let the King's lands of Lochaber and Mamore, for the space of five years, to true men. At the same time, the commissioners had strict instructions to expel all broken men from these districts, which, in the state of affairs at that time, was equivalent to an order to expel the whole population. Similar directions were given relative to the lands forfeited by MacLeod of Lewis.

==== Alexander Mackenzie (1898) ====
Alexander Mackenzie wrote an account of the Battle of Achnashellach in his book History of the Munros of Fowlis in 1898. Mackenzie quote's Gregory's book for the events of 1502 as already mentioned above, and the Lochiel Memoirs also given above.

Sir William is said to have been killed in the prime of his life, in 1505, at a place called Achnashellach or Achnaskellach, in Lochaber, by Ewen "MacAlein Mhic Dhom'huill Duibh", XIII. of Lochiel, in a raid which is thus described in Lochiels Memoirs. Besides the other wars wherein Lochiel was engaged, he had also a ruffle with Baron of Reay, Chief of the MacKays, a people living many miles north of Lochaber. What the quarrel was I know not, but it drew on an invasion from the Camerons, and that an engagement wherein the MacKays were defeated and the Laird of Fowlis, Chief of the Munros, who assisted them, was killed upon the spot.

In 1502 a Royal Commission had been given to the Earl of Huntly, Thomas fourth Lord Lovat, and Sir William Munro of Fowlis, to proceed to Lochaber and let the King's lands of Lochaber and Mamore for the space of five years to true men, and this is what probably led to the raid and the collision with the Camerons in which Sir William was slain.

=== 20th - 21st century publications ===
==== John Stewart of Ardvorlich (1974) ====
John Stewart of Ardvorlich wrote a brief account of the events surrounding the Battle of Achnashellach in his book The Camerons, A History of Clan Cameron, without quoting a source:

There is tradition that the Clan Cameron took part in an expedition to the country of the Mackays in Sutherlandshire and that they defeated a joint force of Munros and Mackays but the object of this enterprise is not clear. Sir William Munro of Foulis was Justiciary and Lieutenant of Inverness and the Earldom of Ross. In 1505 he was killed by "Ewen McAllan Vicoldui" at Achnashellach. As Ewen MacAllan (Cameron) had supported the rebellion of Donald Dubh in 1503 and as Achnashellach is only 12 miles from the Castle of Strome in Lochalsh, which he was constable, it seems likely that Ewen was acting in support of Donald Dubh when Munro was killed.

==== Alister Farquhar Matheson (2014) ====
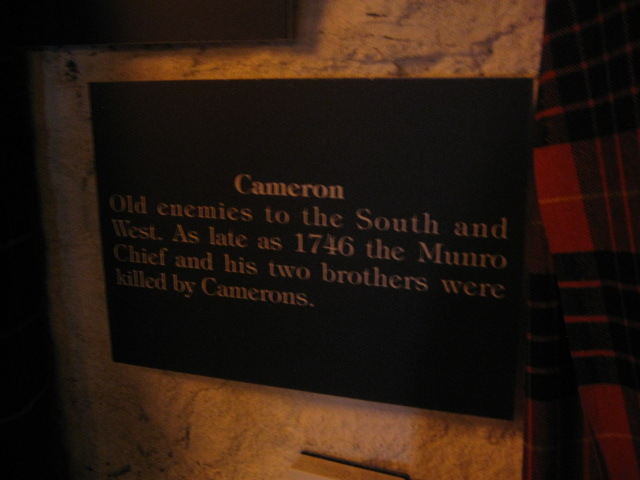
Clan Cameron tartan in the Clan Munro exhibition at the Storehouse of Foulis

Alister Farquhar Matheson writing in 2014, but with no quoted source gives more details of the battle. According to Matheson, the Earl of Huntly, who was James IV of Scotland's commander in the north, called on his deputy, Sir William Munro of Foulis to lead a punitive expedition against the rebel MacDonalds of Lochalsh. The Mackays of Strathnaver demonstrating their loyalty to the king, joined Sir William Munro's force. There is also a tradition that the Clan Sutherland contributed a regiment as the Earl of Huntly's son, Adam was married to Elizabeth, the heiress to the earldom of Sutherland. Ewen Cameron, chief of Clan Cameron was hereditary constable of Strome Castle on behalf of the MacDonalds and he gathered a force to protect the lands of MacDonald of Lochalsh. Matheson tradition is that one of Cameron's officers was Alasdair MacRuairidh, chieftain of the Clan Matheson North who crossed the narrows of Loch Carron with men from Fernaig and Strathascaig and joined the gathering of armed rebels. Cameron marched to the eastern borders of Lochcarron, at Achnashellach where the valley of Carron begins to narrow into Glen Carron which is steeper sided. At this location he laid an ambush to such good effect that William Munro's army was put to flight and Munro himself was slain in the action. This defeat was however only a temporary set back for Huntly's campaign and soon Strome Castle's garrison was forced to surrender.

== Aftermath ==
William Munro of Foulis left two sons, Hector and William. The eldest, Hector Munro took over as chief and had extensive lands confirmed to him by King James V of Scotland at Stirling and was made the Royal Lieutenant of Western Ross-shire as his father was before him. Hector Munro, I of Erribol who was a cadet of the Munros of Foulis was made constable of Strome Castle for the MacDonalds of Glengarry. Previously, Ewen Cameron had been constable of Strome Castle for the MacDonalds of Lochalsh. Ewen Cameron was executed in 1546.
