= Hector Roy Mackenzie =

Scottish clan chieftain

Hector Roy Mackenzie of Gairloch (died 1528) was a Scottish clan chieftain of the Clan Mackenzie, who acquired vast estates in and around Gairloch, Wester Ross as a result of his services to the Scottish crown and challenged his nephew for the chiefship of the clan.

== Origins ==
Hector was the son of Alexander Mackenzie, chief of the clan, by his second wife Margaret Macdonald, the daughter of Roderick Macdonald of Clanranald, 3rd of Moidart.

== Tutor of Kintail ==
Following Alexander Mackenzie's death in 1488, Hector's half-brother Kenneth succeeded to the chiefship. Kenneth died in 1491 and was succeeded by his son, Kenneth Og, to whom Hector was appointed to act as Tutor. Kenneth Og is thought to have died in 1497 and, on his death, the succession to the chiefship became uncertain. The elder Kenneth had had another son, John, by Agnes Fraser, the daughter of Lord Lovat, but their union had been irregular and John was widely regarded as illegitimate. Hector was appointed to act as John's Tutor, but had higher ambitions.

== Acquisition of Gairloch and other estates ==
It is clear that Hector had by then already acquired at least a paper title to a large estate. When the Lords of the Association, a factious party of the nobility, took up arms against James III, Alexander of Kintail despatched his sons, Kenneth and Hector, with a retinue of 500, to join the Royal standard; but Kenneth, hearing of the death of his father on his arrival at Perth, returned home at the request of the Earl of Huntly; and the clan was led by Hector Roy to the battle of Sauchieburn, near Stirling. After the defeat of the Royal forces, and the death there in 1488 of the King himself, Hector, who narrowly escaped, returned to Ross-shire and took the stronghold of Redcastle, then held for the rebels by Rose of Kilravock, and placed a garrison in it. He then joined the Earl of Huntly and the clans in the north who were rising to avenge the death of His Majesty but meanwhile orders came from the youthful King James IV, who had been at the head of the conspirators, ordering the Northern chiefs to lay down their arms, and to submit to the powers that be.

Upon Hector's submission to James IV, according to a manuscript history of the Gairloch family, he was:

"not only received with favour, but to reward his previous fidelity and also to engage him for the future the young King, who at last saw his error, and wanted to reconcile to him those who had been the friends of his father, made him a present of the Barony of Gairloch in the western circuit of Ross-shire by knight-service after the manner of that age. He likewise gave him Brahan in the Low Country, now a seat of the family of Seaforth, the lands of Moy in that neighbourhood, Glassletter (of Kintail), a Royal forest which was made a part of the Barony of Gairloch. In the pleasant valley of Strathpeffer, Castle Leod, part of Hector's paternal estate, afterwards a seat of the Earl of Cromarty; Achterneed near adjacent, also Kinellan, were likewise his, and so was the Barony of Allan, now Allangrange, a few miles southwards. In the Chops of the Highlands he had Fairburn the Wester, and both the Scatwells, the great and the lesser. Westward in the height of that country he had Kinlochewe, a district adjoining Gairloch on the east, and southward on the same track he had the half of Kintail, of which he was [sc. had been] left joint heir with his brother Kenneth, chief of the family."

James I had granted Gairloch on 1430 to Neil Macleod and, although Hector was in possession of Crown charters to at least two-thirds of the lands of Gairloch, he found it very difficult to secure possession of them from the Macleods and their chieftain, Allan MacRory. Allan had married, as his first wife, a daughter of Alexander Mackenzie of Kintail and sister of Hector Roy, with issue - three sons. He married, secondly, a daughter of Roderick Macleod of Lewis, with issue - one son, also Roderick.

Two brothers of Macleod of Lewis are said, traditionally, to have resolved that no Mackenzie blood should flow in the veins of the future head of the Gairloch Macleods, and decided to put Allan's children by Hector Roy's sister to death, so that his son by their own niece should succeed to Gairloch. Crossing over the mainland, they killed Allan and two of his three sons by Hector Roy's sister. Hector Roy started immediately, carrying the bloodstained shirts of his nephews along with him as evidence, to report the murder to the King at Edinburgh. The king, on hearing of the crime, granted Hector a commission of fire and sword against the murderers of his nephews, and gave him a Crown charter to the lands of Gairloch in his own favour dated 1494. The assassins were soon afterwards slain at a hollow between Port Henderson and South Erradale, nearly opposite the northern end of the Island of Raasay.

Hector's legal ownership of Gairloch is confirmed by a deed made by John De Vaux, Sheriff of Inverness, dated 10 December 1494, and his ownership of Brahan and Moy by a precept issued by the King on 5 March 1508.

== Dispute with the chief ==
A dispute arose between Hector and his nephew, the putative new clan chief, John Mackenzie of Killin. The dispute probably related, at least in part, to Hector's rights to the half of Kintail, which his father is said to have left him jointly with his eldest brother, Kenneth (John's father). Hector declared John illegitimate, and held possession of the estates for himself; and the whole clan submitted to his rule.

In 1499, George, Earl of Huntly, then the King's Lieutenant, granted warrant to Duncan Mackintosh, 11th of Mackintosh, John Grant of Freuchie, and other leaders, with three thousand men, to pass against the Clan Mackenzie, "the King's rebels," for the slaughter of Harold of Chisholm, dwelling in Strathglass, "and for divers other heirschips, slaughters, spuilzies, committed on the King's poor lieges and tenants in the Lordship of Ardmeanoch", but the warrant appears not to have been effectively executed.

Hector and his nephew eventually came to terms (according to the traditional account, after John had surrounded and set fire to Hector's house in Fairburn).

The story of Hector's dispute with his nephew is recounted both by the Earl of Cromartie and (in the Ardintoul manuscript) by the Reverend John Macrae (died 1704). It is also supported by Gregory's History of the Western Highlands and Isles of Scotland, which states that:

"Hector Roy Mackenzie, progenitor of the House of Gairloch, had, since the death of Kenneth Og Mackenzie of Kintail, in 1497, and during the minority of John, the brother and heir of Kenneth, exercised the command of that clan, nominally as guardian to the young chief. Under his rule the Clan Mackenzie became involved in feuds with the Munroes and other clans, and Hector Roy himself became obnoxious to Government as a disturber of the public peace. His intentions towards the young Laird of Kintail were considered very dubious; and the apprehensions of the latter having been roused, Hector was compelled by law to yield up the estate and the command of the tribe to the proper heir."

Hector kept possession of Eilean Donan Castle until compelled by an order from the Privy Council to give it up in 1511 to John, and it appears from the records of the Privy Council that from 1501 to 1508 Hector continued to collect the rents of Kintail without giving any account of them; that he again in 1509 accounted for them for twelve months, and for the two succeeding years for the second time retained them, while he seems to have had undisturbed possession of the stronghold of Eilean Donan throughout. No record can be found of his answer to the summons commanding him to appear before the Privy Council, if he ever did put in an appearance, but in all probability he merely kept his hold of that Castle in order to compel his nephew to come to terms with him regarding his joint rights to Kintail, without any intention of ultimately keeping him out of possession.

This view is strengthened by the fact that John obtained a charter under the Great Seal granting him Kintail anew on 25 February 1508-9 – the same year in which Hector received a grant of Brahan and Moy – probably following on an arrangement of their respective rights in those districts; also from the fact that Hector does not appear to have fallen into any disfavour with the Crown on account of his conduct towards John: only two years after Killin raised the action against Hector before the Privy Council, the latter receives a new charter, dated 8 April 1513, under the Great Seal, of Gairloch, Glasletter, and Coirre-nan-Cuilean "in feu and heritage for ever," and he and his nephew appear ever after to have lived on friendly terms.

== Feuds with the MacDonalds and Munros ==
In 1497, Hector Roy Mackenzie is said to have defeated the Clan MacDonald of Lochalsh at the first Battle of Drumchatt. Mackenzie chronicles have claimed a signal victory over the Clan Munro at the second Battle of Drumchatt in 1501, in which they were led by Hector Roy Mackenzie.

== Later years ==
In acknowledgment of the King's favour, Hector gathered his followers in the west, joined his nephew, John of Killin, with his vassals, and fought, in command of the clan, at the disastrous Battle of Flodden, from which both narrowly escaped, but most of their followers were killed.

Hector Roy died in 1528. On 8 September in that year, a grant is recorded to Sir John Dingwall, "Provost of Trinity College, beside Edinburgh, of the ward of the lands of Gairloch, which pertained to the umquhile Achinroy [Hector] Mackenzie."

== Family and posterity ==
Hector Roy was betrothed to a daughter of the Laird of Grant - probably Sir Duncan, who flourished from 1434 to 1485 - but she died before the marriage was solemnised. He, however, had a son by her called Hector Cam, he being blind of an eye, to whom he gave Achterneed and Castle Leod, as his patrimony. Hector Cam married a daughter of Angus Roy Mackay, 9th of Strathnaver, ancestor of Lord Reay, by whom he had two sons Alexander Roy and Murdo.

Hector Roy, after the death of Grant of Grant's daughter, married his cousin Anne, daughter of Ranald MacRanald, generally known as Ranald Ban Macdonald of Moidart and Clanranald. Anne had previously been married to MacLeod chief William Dubh MacLeod of Harris and Dunvegan. Hector Roy and Anne had four sons – John "Glassich" Mackenzie (his heir), Kenneth, John "Tuach" and Dougal Roy – and three daughters who married respectively, Bayne of Tulloch, John Aberach Mackay, and Hugh Bayne Fraser of Bunchrew, a natural son of Thomas, Lord Lovat, killed at Blar-na-Leine and ancestor of the Frasers of Reelick.

The lands of Gairloch are still owned by Hector Roy's descendants, over 500 years after they were acquired.

== See also ==
- Thomas Mackenzie of Pluscarden
- Kenneth Mackenzie of Suddie
- Mackenzie of Gairloch

== Bibliography ==
- Fraser, C.I of Reelig (1954). The Clan Munro. Stirling: Johnston & Bacon. pp. 20–21. ISBN 0-7179-4535-9.
- Gordon, Robert (1813) [Printed from original manuscript 1580 - 1656]. A Genealogical History of the Earldom of Sutherland. Edinburgh: Printed by George Ramsay and Co. for Archibald Constable and Company Edinburgh; and White, Cochrance and Co. London.
- Gregory, Donald (1881). The History of The Western Highlands and Isles of Scotland. London and Glasgow: Hamilton, Adams & Co. and Thomas D. Morison.
- Mackenzie, Alexander (1894). History of the Mackenzies: With Genealogies of the Principal Families of the Name (New, revised, extended ed.). Inverness: A. & W. Mackenzie.
