= Dingwall of Kildun =

Dingwall coat of arms

Dingwall or Dingwell is a Scottish surname. One of the most prominent families by the name of Dingwall in Scotland were the Dingwalls of Kildun who were vassals of the Earl of Ross and also septs of the Clan Munro, a Scottish clan of the Scottish Highlands.

== History ==
=== Origins of the name ===
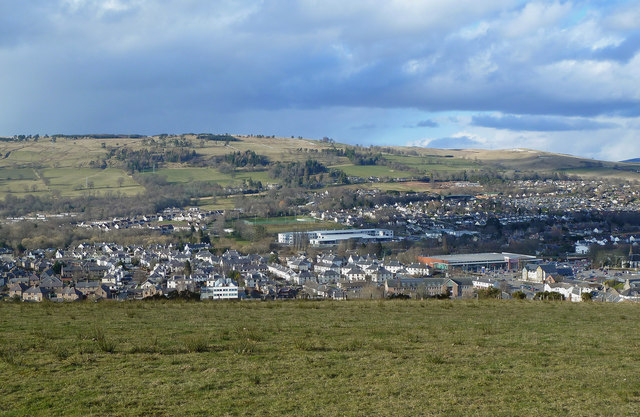
The town of Dingwall

Dingwall is a habitational surname, derived from the town of Dingwall in Ross-shire, Scotland. Dingwall is probably composed of the Old Norse words thing ("assembly") and vǫllr ("field").

=== 14th and 15th century ===
An early reference to the family is made by Mr James Fraser, minister of Kirkhill, in his MS. History of the Frasers; Simon Fraser, Lord Lovat who was executed in 1306, had a son, Hugh Fraser who was fostered with the Baron of Foyers, and afterwards taken into the custody of the Earl of Ross who married him with Eupham Dingwall, the Baron of Kildun's only daughter.

Another early reference to the Dingwalls of Kildun is that of their involvement in the Battle of Bealach nam Broig in 1452 where William Dingwall and 140 followers are said to have been killed fighting in support of the Earl of Ross.

== Lairds of Kildun ==
=== Thomas Dingwall, 1st of Kildun ===
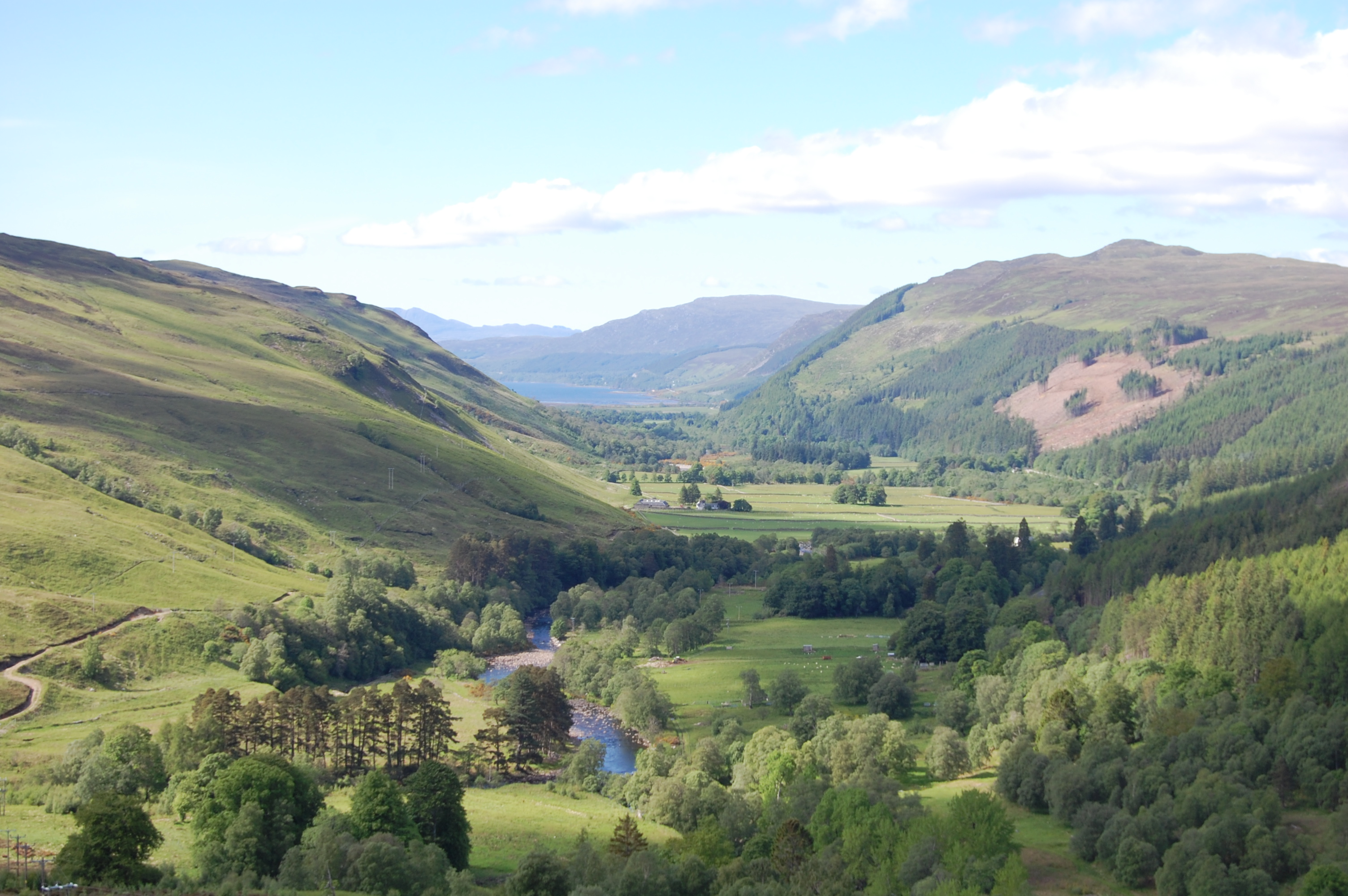
Lochbroom where the Dingwalls of Kildun inherited lands from Janet (MacDonald) of the Isles and exchanged them with the Mackenzies for the lands of Fodderty

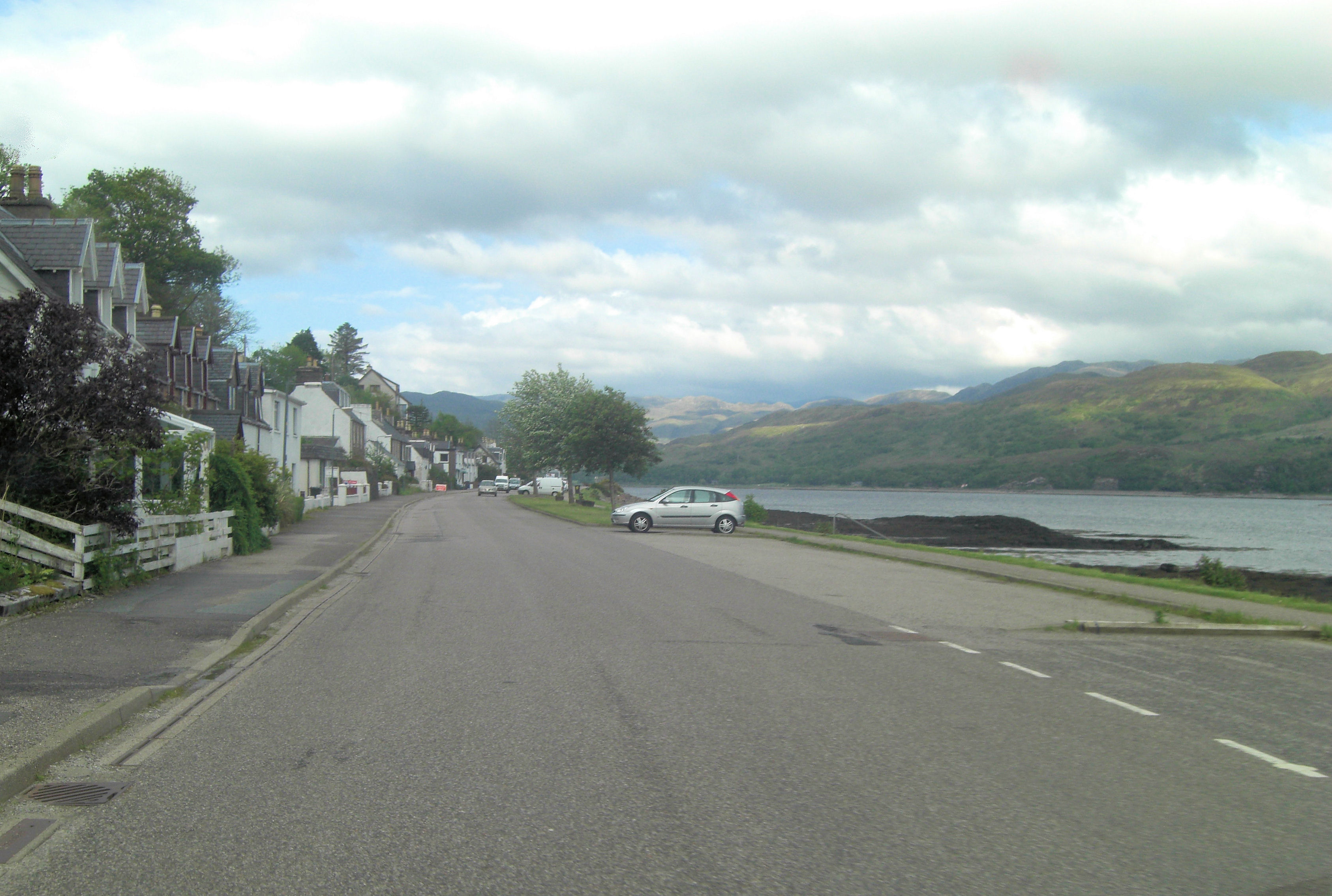
Lochcarron where the Dingwalls of Kildun inherited land from Janet of the Isles and that were later sold to the Mackenzies

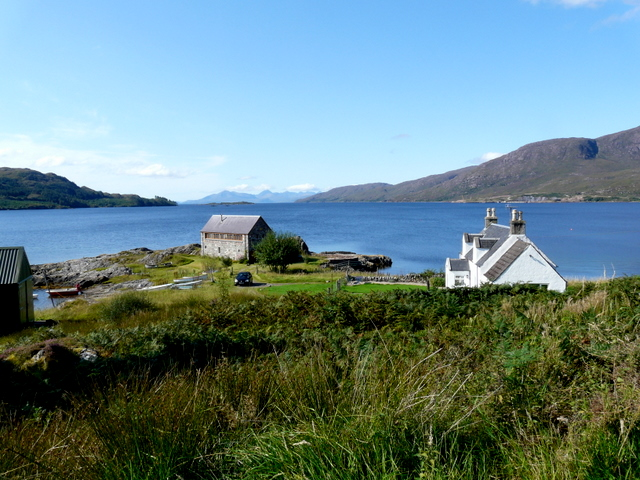
Kishorn where the Dingwalls of Kildun inherited land from Janet of the Isles

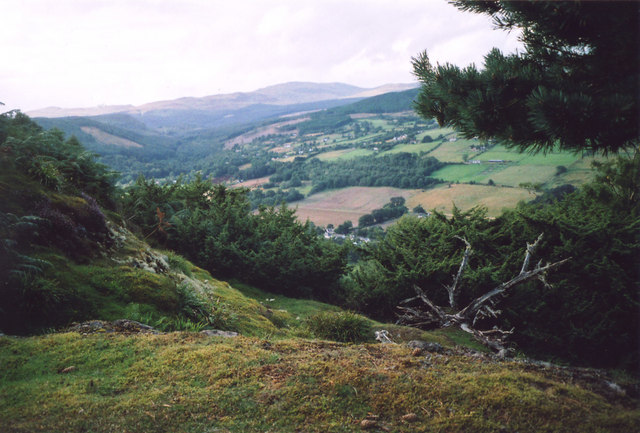
Fodderty where the Dingwalls received lands in exchange for the lands of Lochbroom with the Mackenzies, but the Dingwalls later sold their lands of Fodderty as well

Thomas Dingwall of Kildun, who held high office in the Church and the earldom of Ross. He was also Treasurer of the Diocese of Caithness in 1488, burgess of Dingwall in 1456, Treasurer to John of Islay, Earl of Ross and Lord of the Isles in 1462 and Chamberlain to the Earl in 1463. In 1451 he had received a charter from the burgesses of Dingwall for land and a mill near Robert's Bridge (pontem Roberti de Munroo supra Peffery). (Latin translation: Robert de Munro's bridge above Peffery).

Historian R.W Munro stated that the Mackenzie statement that Thomas Dingwall of Kildun who was granted lands by charter in 1463, was the son of the Dingwall killed at Bealach nam Broig, is unsourced and the royal confirmation does not include those words.

=== Thomas Dingwall, 2nd of Kildun ===
Thomas Dingwall of Kildun, received a charter for the lands of his predecessor in 1456, and appears to have held the lands of Kildun for a period of 50 years. In 1505/6 he resigned the lands of Kildun to the Abbot of Dunfermline who granted them the following month to his son and heir, William Dingwall.

According to Mackenzie chronicles, in 1501 the Dingwalls had supported William Munro, 12th Baron of Foulis at the Battle of Drumchatt against Hector Roy Mackenzie of Gairloch in which the Mackenzies have claimed victory.

=== William Dingwall, 3rd of Kildun ===
William Dingwall of Kildun, who before his father's death owned some property in or near Dingwall. He succeeded his father in 1505/6. He married Janet (MacDonald), daughter of Sir Alexander MacDonald of Lochalsh, whose father, Celestine, was brother of John of Islay, Earl of Ross and Lord of the Isles. Janet was previously married to a member of the Clan Macdonald of Clanranald, and along with her sister, Margaret, wife of Alexander MacDonald of Glengarry, were co-heiresses of their brother Donald, known as Donald Gallda. William Dingwall took part in the rebellion of Sir Donald during the regency which followed the death of James IV of Scotland at the Battle of Flodden in 1513. William Dingwall was killed in 1527 by Roderick, son of Kenneth Mackenzie, 7th of Kintail, although nothing is known of the circumstances, a Mackenzie chronicle refers to it as "the unjust killing of the Laird of Kildun".

=== Thomas Dingwall, 4th of Kildun ===
Thomas Dingwall of Kildun, was probably a minor when his father was killed, as ward of all the family's lands were given to Sir John Dingwall, provost of Trinity College Church beside Edinburgh. Sir John Dingwall was probably a relation but it is not known how. Through his mother, Thomas Dingwall of Kildun inherited the lands of Lochalsh, Lochbroom, Kishorn, and Ferinkoskry in Braychatt. During this period the Mackenzie chiefs were increasing their power and Thomas Dingwall parted with nearly all of these possessions between 1543 and 1571. In 1543, Lochbroom was exchanged with John Mackenzie, 9th of Kintail for the lands and mill of Fodderty. In 1554 half of Lochalsh went by wadset to Kenneth, son of John Mackenzie of Kintail and finally sold to them in 1571. Ferinkoskry in Braychatt, Sutherland, was sold in 1553 to Duncan Bayne of Tulloch whose son sold it to Robert Mor Munro, 15th Baron of Foulis in 1563. In 1571, Thomas Dingwall gave a charter to Alexander Bayne of Tulloch and Anne Fraser his wife for half of the lands of Torridon. So from his mother's inheritance he only kept Lochcarron but had acquired Fodderty which was convenient to Kildun. He had married Janet Hay in 1533/4 and had at the same time part of the lands of Kildun granted to them by George Durie the Abbot of Dunfermline. He married secondly, Barbara Urquhart and he died in 1573.

=== John Dingwall, 5th of Kildun ===
John Dingwall of Kildun, was made heir to his father in 1573 at Inverness. In 1577, the Privy Council of Scotland accused him of shooting fifteen or sixteen deer in the forest of Bray which was the property of Walter Urquhart of Cromarty, but he maintained that he had only shot one deer with an arrow. In 1589, he was accused, along with his servant, Donald Dingwall, of wounding Alexander Bane the younger in Knokinbaxter, and again for taking John MacInogach in Mekel Oussie and holding him bound in Kildun for 48 hours. For these and other offences he was denounced as a rebel for not appearing in front of the Privy Council. John Dingwall lost the rest of the inheritance from Janet of the Isles: in 1579 he sold to Colin Cam Mackenzie, 11th of Kintail half of the lands of Lochcarron and in 1576 had sold the lands of Fodderty. Most of the MacDonald lands that he been inherited by the Dingwalls had therefore passed to the Mackenzies of Kintail.

=== Roderick or Rory Dingwall, 6th of Kildun ===
Roderick Dingwall of Kildun, is first recorded as Rory Dingwall in 1598/9 having been put on security of £500 not to harm John Dunbar of Avoch. Rory Dingwall married Catherine, daughter of Alexander Bayne of Wester Logie. He was imprisoned in Edinburgh Tolbooth in 1608 when he gave a discharge to Kenneth Mackenzie of Kintail for money paid to David Lindsay, the keeper of the Tolbooth, for his release. In 1626, he appears as Rory Dingwall of Auchintrayd (near Kishorn), in the barony of Lochcarron, and formerly of Kildun. The document shows that he no longer owned Kildun and that he was then selling Auchintrayd too. In 1631, Roderick Dingwall was served heir to Celestine McConnell, the grandfather of his great-grandmother. However, this formality did not have much value because Roderick was required in connection with the litigation between MacDonald of Glengarry and Munro of Foulis on the inheritance of Celestine. This was the last appearance of the Dingwalls of Kildun on record.

== See also ==
- Dingwall
- Dingwall Castle
- Dingwall (disambiguation)
