= Dingwall (disambiguation) =

Dingwall is a town and former royal burgh in the highlands of Scotland.

Dingwall may also refer to:

- Dingwall (Burgh), Scotland
- Dingwall (Parliament of Scotland constituency), a pre-1707 constituency
- Dingwall, Nova Scotia, Canada
- Dingwall of Kildun, a Scottish family
- Dingwall Designer Guitars, a manufacturer of electric bass guitars
- Lord Dingwall, a title in the Peerage of Scotland

== See also ==
- Dingwalls, a live music and comedy venue, Camden, London, England
