= Battle of Bealach nam Broig =

Battle in Highland, Scotland

Coordinates: 57°42′3″N 4°39′4″W

- Part of the Scottish clan wars
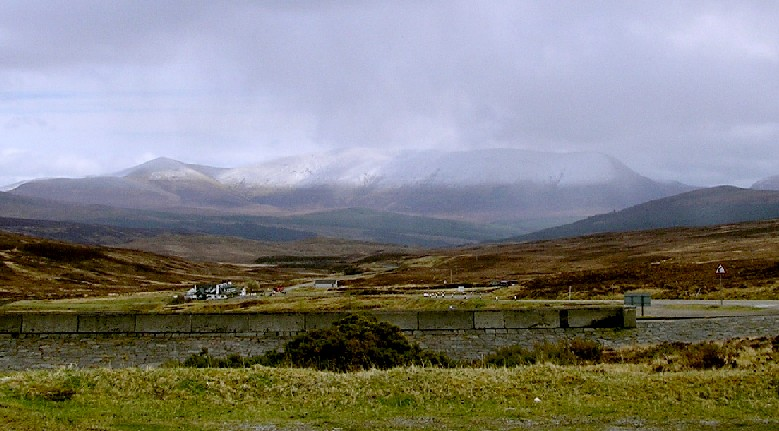
- Ben Wyvis seen from the west. Carn Mòr is the smaller hill on the far left, the pass lies between the two.
Date	probably 1452 (may be as early as 1299)
Location	between Inverness and Ullapool, near Garbat grid reference NH422713
Result	Munro and Dingwall victory

Belligerents
Allies of the Earl of Ross: Clan Munro; Dingwall family Clan Fraser of Lovat	Septs of Clan Mackenzie: Clan MacIver; Clan Macaulay; Clan MacLeay; Clan MacLennan

Commanders and leaders
George Munro, 10th Baron of Foulis †; William Dingwall, Baron of Kildun †; Hugh Fraser, 1st Lord Lovat	Supporters of Alexander Mackenzie, 6th of Kintail: Donald Garbh MacIver; Duncan Macaulay.

Strength
Unknown	Unknown

Casualties and losses
According to Sir Robert Gordon (1630): "lost a great number of men" According to George Mackenzie, 1st Earl of Cromartie (1669): Munro of Foulis and 3 sons killed According to Alexander Mackenzie (1894): 140 Dingwalls killed 11 Munros killed	According to Sir Robert Gordon (1630): "Utterly Extinguished"; According to George Mackenzie, 1st Earl of Cromartie (1669): All 26 men killed According to Alexander Mackenzie (1894): "Extirpated" (Extinct)

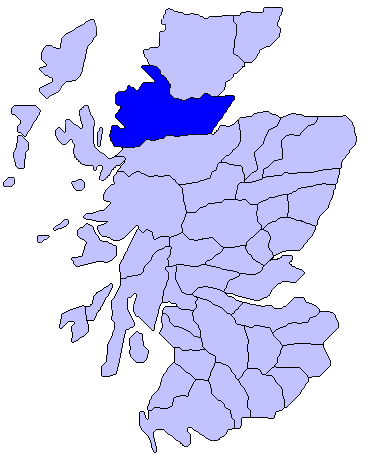
The historic district of Ross.

The Battle of Bealach nam Broig (Scottish Gaelic: Pass of the Brogue; also known as the Great Battle of Bealach nam Broig, Bealach nam Brog, Beallighne-Broig, and Bealach na Broige) was fought between Scottish clans from the lands of north-west Ross, against north-eastern clans of Ross who supported the Earl of Ross. The actual date of the battle is debated, it probably occurred in 1452 but the Conflicts of the Clans suggests a date as early as 1299.

Bealach nam Brog lies about 20 miles northwest of Inverness in the parish of Fodderty, overlooking the A835 road that goes west past Loch Glascarnoch to Ullapool. The pass separates the high ridge of Ben Wyvis from the lower summit of Carn Mòr, overlooking Loch Bealach Cùlaidh to the east. Thomas describes it as 2 miles north west of Garbat, at the watershed between the Strathrannock River and Garbat River, and also as being between Ferrin-Donald and Lochbroom. The Garbat and Strathrannock both run into the Blackwater, a tributary of the River Conon that flows east from Loch Glascarnoch.

== Archaeology ==
"A perfect specimen of an arrowhead" was found near the battlefield in 1913.

== Accounts of the battle ==
=== 17th-century manuscripts ===
==== Sir Robert Gordon (1630) ====
The earliest account of the Battle of Bealach nam Broig was written by Sir Robert Gordon (1580–1656) in his manuscript of around 1630. This was published in a book in 1813, entitled A Genealogical History of the Earldom of Sutherland, and says the battle was fought in around 1275. However, an earlier book based on the same manuscript, published in 1764 and again in 1780, Conflicts of the Clans, gives the year of the battle as 1299.

There was a rising against the Earl of Ross by highlanders living in the mountains, consisting of the "Clan-juer" (Clan Iver), "Clantalvigh" (Clan-t-aluigh, i.e. Clan Aulay), and "Clan-leajwe" (Clan-leaive, i.e. Clan Leay).

The Earl Ross responded by capturing the leader of the insurrection, and imprisoned him at Dingwall Castle. Incensed, the revolting clans seized the earl's second son at Balnagown, to aid in the release of their leader, and carried him with them. The Munros and Dingwalls in response pursued and overtook the rising clans at Bealach nam Broig. A bitter battle ensued, fuelled by old feuds and animosities. In the end the MacIvers, MacAulays and MacLeays were almost utterly extinguished and slain, and the Munros and Dingwalls won a hollow victory: though the earl's son had been rescued, they had lost a great number of men. According to Gordon's account there were killed 140 Dingwalls and eleven Munros of the house of Foulis that were to succeed one another, so that the succession fell to a child lying in a cradle.

==== George Mackenzie, 1st Earl of Cromartie (1669) ====
George Mackenzie, 1st Earl of Cromartie wrote an account in his MS History of the Family of Mackenzie in 1669. He placed the battle immediately after the Battle of Harlaw, in 1411. George Mackenzie states that it was a Mackenzie ("Murdo Nidroit Mackenzie") who was made prisoner by the Earl of Ross, and that the Ross Laird of Balnagowan was then seized by a force of Mackenzies. The Munros then pursued and attacked the Kinlochewe men who held captive the Laird of Balnagowan who was a friend and neighbor of the Munro Laird of Foulis. George Mackenzie's account states that four of the Mackenzie's Kinlochewe men carried the Laird of Balnagowan from the battle while the rest, who numbered twenty-six, were killed to a man. On the other side George Munro of Foulis and his three sons were also killed. The Mackenzie's Kinlochewe men were then successful in using their captive in bargaining for the release of their leader in exchange.

==== John Mackenzie of Applecross (1669) ====
John Mackenzie of Applecross wrote his manuscript history of the Mackenzies around the same time that George Mackenzie, 1st Earl of Cromartie wrote his and the two tally closely in details. It has therefore been suggested that they derive from a common source. Like Cromartie, Mackenzie of Applecross places the battle after the Battle of Harlaw in 1411. However, Mackenzie of Applecross states that the Kinlochewe men were led by one Duncan MacAulay. MacAulay apparently apprehended the Laird of Balnagowan and marched away with him. They were pursued by the Munros and Dingwalls who MacAulay resolved to fight at a pass called Bellach ni broigg. He sent two of his men to flee with the Laird of Balnagowan but the two men instead tied the Laird to a tree to stop him escaping and so that they could join in with the battle. MacAulay's arrows having run out he was forced to quit the pass. The Dingwall Laird of Kildun was killed with seven score of his men and the Munros lost thirteen who were allegedly supposed to succeed the Munro Laird of Foulis. As with Cromartie's account, MacAulay then used his prisoner to bargain for the release of his master who was a Mackenzie.

==== Letterfearn Manuscript (c. 1670) ====
It has been claimed that the Letterfearn manuscript, which is a history and genealogy of Clan Mackenzie, was written sometime between 1663 and 1670, and only an incomplete copy has survived. It contains a bardic story concerning the "battle of the brogues" in which Euphame of Ross wished to marry a Mackenzie. However, Euphemia I, Countess of Ross had died by 1398 and Euphemia II, Countess of Ross had died by 1424. The generally accepted date of the Battle of Bealach nam Broig is 1452 which therefore casts doubt on the story written in the Letterfearn manuscript.

The story runs that Euphame of Ross wished to marry Mackenzie, despite his refusals. Her followers imprisoned him and tortured his servant, who stated that Eilean Donan Castle would never be surrendered by its constable, Macaulay, except to the one who wore Mackenzie's ring. The ring was then taken from Mackenzie, and used to deceive Macaulay into handing over the castle as a pledge that Mackenzie would not break his alleged engagement to the countess. When Macaulay learned that he was tricked snuck into Dingwall Castle, and communicated with Mackenzie who devised a plan to kidnap the countess' uncle. When the deed was carried out, Macaulay was then pursued by Munros and Dingwalls. When Macaulay and his followers were about to be overtaken he sent his prisoner and two men to continue while he stood to defend a pass. The pass, the story says, has since then been known as the 'pass of the brogue', because the pursuers were forced to cover their chests with their brogues to defend themselves against the arrows of the defenders. When Macaulay's arrows had run out he was forced to quit the pass and retreat towards Kintail. Along the way he surprised a party of Rosses who were carrying provisions to Eilean Donan Castle. Macaulay and his followers then arrived at the castle, passing as the Rosses with provisions, and re-took the castle. Macaulay prepared for a long siege and sent word that he would hang his prisoner, the Laird of Balnagowan, unless his master, Mackenzie, was set free—and so Mackenzie was freed in exchange for Ross of Balnagowan.

==== Wardlaw Manuscript (1674) ====
James Fraser wrote the Wardlaw manuscript in about 1674. It states that the Battle of Bealach nam Broig took place in 1374. Fraser states that there was an insurrection against Hugh, Earl of Ross. (At the time the Earl was Euphemia I, Countess of Ross, however the chief of Clan Ross was Hugh Ross, 1st of Balnagowen). Fraser states that the rebels attempted to seize the Earl at Dingwall, who being aware of this made an expedition and captured their leader Donald Garve MacIver. The rebels in response captured the Earls' second son, Alexander at Balnagowan. The Earl then acquaints Fraser, Lord Lovat who with the Monroes and Dingwalls pursued the rebels and overtook them at Beallach in Broig, where they were encamped and there ensued a cruel conflict. The rebel clans were almost cut off and the Monroes had a sorrowful victory of it, having lost a great number of their own men but carried back the Earl's son. The Laird of Kildun was killed along with seven score of the name Dingwall.

==== George Martine (1635-1712) ====
George Martine (1635-1712) wrote his manuscript history of the Munro chiefs in the late 17th century. In the opening paragraph it mentions the battle as having taken place in 1299 but on the next page he says that the battle took place in 1452, and this latter date was later used by historian Alexander Mackenzie in his History of the Mackenzies in 1894 and History of the Munros in 1898. Martine's account for 1299 mirrors that of Gordon's and his account of 1452 just mentions that the Munro chief and his son were killed at The Conflict of Bellachnabrog.

=== 19th- and 20th-century publications ===
==== John Anderson (1825) ====
Historian John Anderson wrote an account of the Battle of Bealach nam Broig in his History of the Frasers in 1825, quoting from the MSS of Frasers (Wardlaw MS), MSS of Mackenzies and MSS of Foulis family – in the Advocate's Library.

In 1374, vassals of the Earl of Ross rose against him, the bulk of who were MacIvers, MacAulays, and MacLeas. It was decided they would surprise the Earl, but having been forewarned, the Earl captured and imprisoned their leader, Donald Garbh MacIver in the castle of Dingwall.

The rebelling faction then apprehended the Earl of Ross's second son, Alexander, at Balnagown and carried him captive with them to make a deal with the Earl. The Earl of Ross asked for assistance from the Laird of Lovat, who then sent 200 men and a force of Dingwalls and Munros, in aid of the Earl. This force overtook the clans at Bealach nam Broig where they had encamped. During the battle which followed the clans Iver and Leave (MacLeay) "were almost cut off."

The Laird of Lovat and his force were victorious in the affair, as he had rescued the Earl's son, but the victory was dearly bought. The Dingwalls suffered heavy casualties including their chief, William Dingwall of Kildun, and 140 of his clan. The Munros besides losing many men, also suffered losses to their leading family of Foulis. The Munros of Foulis lost 11 members who were to succeed one another, and after the battle the succession of the house fell to an infant.

==== Alexander Mackenzie (1894/1898) ====
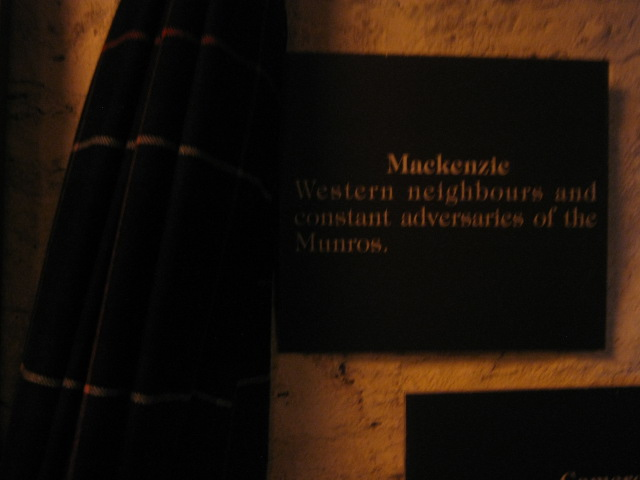
Clan Mackenzie tartan in the Clan Munro exhibition at the Storehouse of Foulis

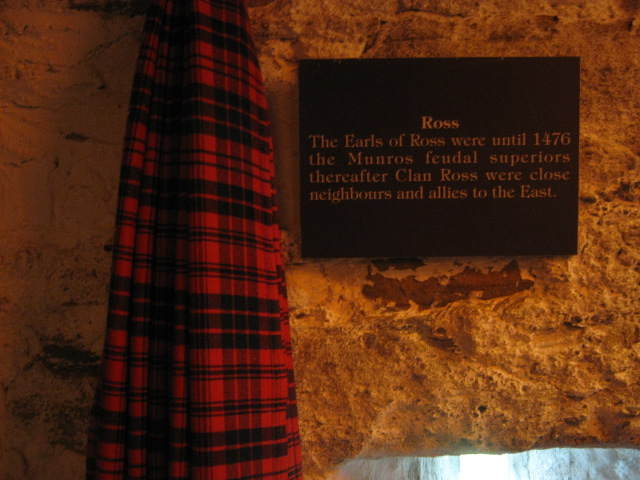
Clan Ross tartan in the Clan Munro exhibition at the Storehouse of Foulis

Alexander Mackenzie maintained the battle was fought in 1452, citing a manuscript, (the Fowlis papers), which backed up his theory. If the battle was fought in 1452 then the Earl of Ross at the time was John of Islay, Earl of Ross who was also the Lord of the Isles and chief of Clan Donald. The battle was instigated by Donald Garbh MacIver and vassals of their chief Mackenzie of Kintail, who attempted to seize the Earl of Ross. After MacIver's plot was discovered he was imprisoned in Dingwall Castle by followers of the Earl of Ross.

Mackenzie's followers from Kenlochewe, consisting of MacIvers, MacLennans, MacAulays, and MacLeays, freed him and then seized Alexander Ross of Balnagown (chief of Clan Ross) who was a relative of the Earl of Ross.

The Earl of Ross then asked for assistance from the Lord Lovat (chief of Clan Fraser of Lovat) who was "His Majesty's Lieutenant in the North". Lovat sent 200 men who joined Ross's vassals including the Munros of Foulis, and the Dingwalls of Kildun. This force then overtook the clans from Kenlochewe, at Bealach nam Broig.

The clans of Kenlochewe were said to have been almost extirpated, while all Dingwalls who numbered 140 were killed and the Munro family of Foulis lost 11, which included the leading men of their clan.

==== R. W. Munro (1969/1978) ====
R.W Munro, writing in the Clan Munro Magazine in 1969, stated that the earliest account of the battle is Sir Robert Gordon's account from around 1630 and that there are no contemporary accounts of the battle from the time when it is said to have taken place. Regarding historian Alexander Mackenzie citing a historic manuscript, the Fowlis papers, to back up his theory that the battle was fought in 1452, this was in fact no more than a quotation from George Martine's late 17th century Munro genealogy which is self contradictory in that it gives two dates for the battle: 1299 and 1452. R.W Munro also states that the Mackenzie statement that Thomas Dingwall of Kildun who was granted lands by charter in 1463, was the son of the Dingwall killed at Bealach-nam-Brog, is unsourced and the royal confirmation does not include those words. While the year 1452 does fit well with the Munro chief's genealogy for the date of the battle, R.W Munro states that a case can also be made for 1369 as the year of the battle by Mackenzie sources which claim that the western clans fought a rearguard action against one of the old Earls of Ross before the earldom was merged with the Lordship of the Isles which was after the Battle of Harlaw which took place in 1411.

In 1978, R.W Munro published a book The Munro Tree 1734 which includes both the details of a Munro family tree dating from 1734 as well as his own historical research into the Munro family. Munro states that the Munro family tree of 1734 mentions that George Munro of Foulis was killed at the Battle of Bealach Nam Broig but it does not mention the often repeated tradition that there fell 'eleven Munros of the house of Foulis that were to succeed one another, so that the succession fell to a child lying in a cradle'. R. W. Munro also states that it is recorded that George Munro of Foulis was dead by 1453, just a year after the battle.

==== Other accounts ====
John of Islay, Earl of Ross who was also the Lord of the Isles had supported the Earl of Douglas in rebellion against the king. George Eyre-Todd writing in 1923 stated that George Munro of Foulis was killed during the wars of the Isles and Douglases, the Battle of Brechin having been fought by supporters of the Douglases in 1452, which was the same year that the Battle of Bealach nam Broig took place, but Eyre-Todd gives the year of Munro's death as 1454.

== Location ==
According to F. W. L. Thomas, the battle was fought two miles north-west of Garbat, which is below Ben Wyvis at the watershed between the Strathrannoch and Garbat rivers, not far from Inchbae on the road from Dingwall to Ullapool. Professor Watson agrees with this, placing it near to Bealach Collaidh, which is the gap between Inchbae and Coriebhacaidh. Another source places it further west, just south of Dundonnell.

== Mythical account of the name 'Pass of the Brogue' ==
A mythical account of the Battle of Bealach nam Broig gives light as to the origin of its name. At a great battle between the Mackenzies and Dingwalls, where the Dingwalls were defeated by the vastly smaller force of Mackenzies who had the aid of a little bodach (old man). Before the battle the old man came to the Mackenzies and promised to help them. He told the Mackenzies to put the left brogue on the right foot and the right brogue on the left foot, and because of this the Mackenzies were able to kill all the Dingwalls.
