= Ben Wyvis =

Mountain in Highland, Scotland

- Beinn Uais
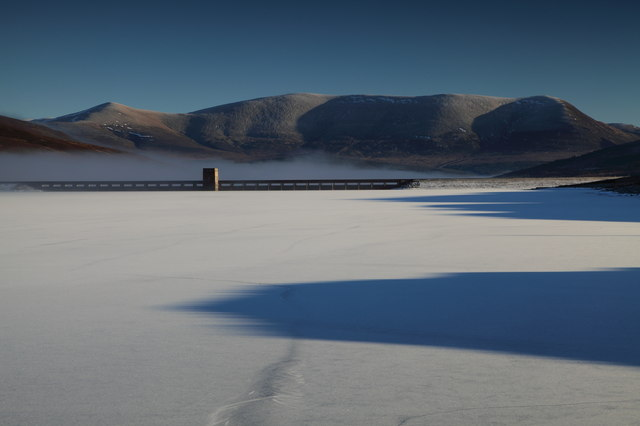
- Ben Wyvis seen from Loch Glascarnoch

Highest point
- Elevation: 1,046 m (3,432 ft)
- Prominence: c. 691 m
- Parent peak: Beinn Dearg
- Listing: Marilyn, Munro

Naming
- Language of name: Gaelic
- Pronunciation: Scottish Gaelic: [peɲ ˈuəʃ; ˈkl̪ˠas̪ʎɛhət̪ ˈmoːɾ]

Geography
- Location: Easter Ross, Scotland
- Parent range: Northwest Highlands
- OS grid: NH463684
- Topo map: OS Landranger 20

Listed summits of Ben Wyvis
Name	Grid ref	Height	Status
Glas Leathad Mòr	NH463684	1,046 m (3,432 ft)	Munro, Marilyn
Tom a' Chòinnich	NH463700	953 m (3,127 ft)	Munro Top
An Cabar	NH450666	946 m (3,104 ft)	Munro Top
Glas Leathad Beag	NH492706	928 m (3,045 ft)	Munro Top, HuMP

Ben Wyvis (Scottish Gaelic: Beinn Uais) is a mountain in Easter Ross, in the northern Highlands of Scotland. It lies north-west of Dingwall, in the council area of Highland and the county of Ross and Cromarty. Ben Wyvis is a large winding and undulating ridge running roughly north–south for about 5 km, the highest point of which is Glas Leathad Mòr at 1,046 metres (3,432 ft). Geologically, the ridge is composed of Moine pelitic gneiss. The mountain is prominent in views of the area, presenting a whale-back shape above the farmland of Strathconon.

Ben Wyvis is an important habitat for several species of plants and birds, and is designated as a National Nature Reserve (NNR), a Special Protection Area (SPA), a Special Area of Conservation (SAC), and a Site of Special Scientific Interest (SSSI). Of particular importance is the woolly hair-moss that covers the summit plateau. This springy moss provides ideal nesting territory for dotterel that breed here each summer: Ben Wyvis represents at least 2.4% of the breeding population in Great Britain.

== Name ==
The name is believed to come from Gaelic Beinn Uais, which probably means "high or lofty mountain", from the same root as uasal (noble, lofty). Another suggestion is that it comes from Beinn Uabhas, "mountain of terror".

== Landscape ==
Ben Wyvis is a large winding and undulating ridge running roughly north–south for about 5 km, the highest point of which is called Glas Leathad Mòr ("the great green slope") at 1,046 metres (3,432 ft) above sea level.

To the south lies the Corbett of Little Wyvis, which is separated from Ben Wyvis by the Bealach Mòr. The A835 road between Dingwall and Ullapool runs to the west and south of these mountains, whilst the Kyle of Lochalsh railway line passes to the south, following a route between Dingwall and Kyle of Lochalsh. Loch Glass lies to the northeast, whilst the land to the northwest is mountainous and largely uninhabited, and crossed by no roads until the A837, some 30 km to the north.

== Geology ==
Ben Wyvis is primarily composed of Moine schist, which was formed as sediment around 1,000 to 870 million years ago during a period when the landmass that is now Scotland was covered by shallow seas. As the amount of sediment increased the layers underwent metamorphism due to the increased temperature and pressure, resulting in the formation of a hard, water-resistant rock. This schist was subjected to further upheaval during the Caledonian orogeny, leading to formation of waves and folds which are visible in the rocks.

During the Ice Age much of Scotland was periodically covered by ice sheets, with glaciers forming in corries and glens. During the final phase of this period, much of Ben Wyvis was covered by ice. The presence of glacial erratic boulders can be interpreted as marking the upper extent of the ice sheet, with the top of Ben Wyvis remaining free of ice.

== History ==
Ben Wyvis stands on the northern edge of historic lands of Clan Munro. By tradition, the Munros held their land from the Crown. The king declared that they held their lands on condition of furnishing a snowball at midsummer if required. This condition they could easily fulfil, as snow was to be found in some of the mountain corries of their property all year round.

The Battle of Bealach nam Broig was fought between rival clans near the pass that separates Ben Wyvis from the lower summit of Carn Mòr, which lies to the northwest. Clans from lands to the north-west who were allied to Clan Mackenzie fought against north-eastern clans (including Clan Munro) who supported the Earl of Ross. The actual date of the battle is debated, but is thought to be 1452.

From the sixteenth century cattle-droving was one of the major economic activities in the highlands, and Ben Wyvis lay near to a major drove road between northwest Scotland and the cattle markets of the south. Drovers often took a shortcut across the southern flanks of the mountain, following the Allt á Bhealaich Mhòir before crossing the bealach between Ben Wyvis and Little Wyvis then rejoining the main route near Auchterneed. The drove road was still being used into the early twentieth century. There are remains of a settlement at Garbat which may have been used as a holding point for the drovers and their cattle. The sites of buildings (including iron workings) found along the Allt á Bhealaich Mhòir are also thought to date from this period.

=== Modern ownership ===
The southern and western sides of Ben Wyvis are now owned by NatureScot, forming the Ben Wyvis NNR, whilst the northern and eastern flanks form part of a privately owned sporting estate, Wyvis Estate. The lower slopes to the west of the NNR are forested, and owned by Forestry and Land Scotland. As with all land in Scotland, there is a right of responsible access to most of the land on and surrounding Ben Wyvis under the Scottish Outdoor Access Code for people wishing to undertake pursuits such as walking, cycling, horse-riding and wild camping: this applies regardless of whether the land is in public or private ownership.

== Nature and conservation ==
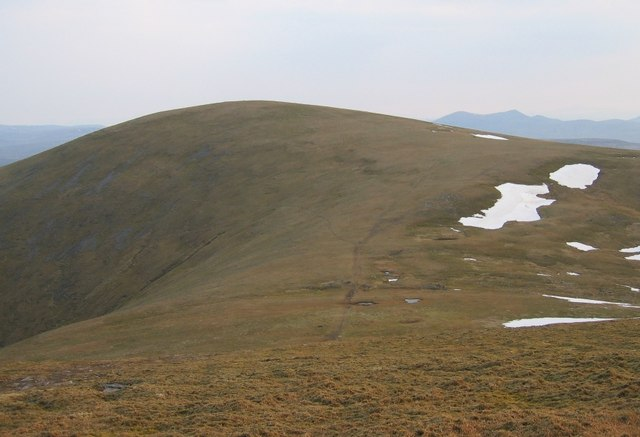
The mossy summit ridge of Ben Wyvis.

Beinn Wyvis National Nature Reserve
- IUCN category II (national park)
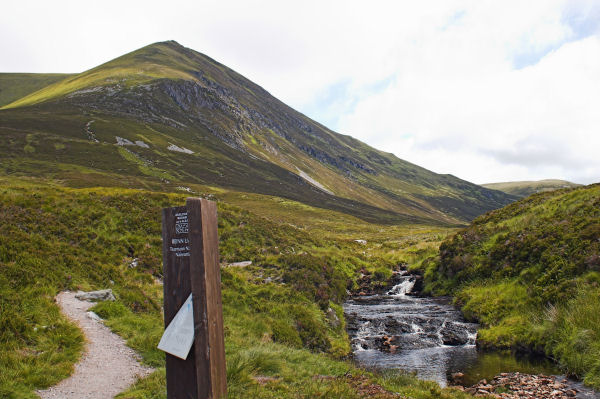
- View of An Cabar from the entrance to the NNR

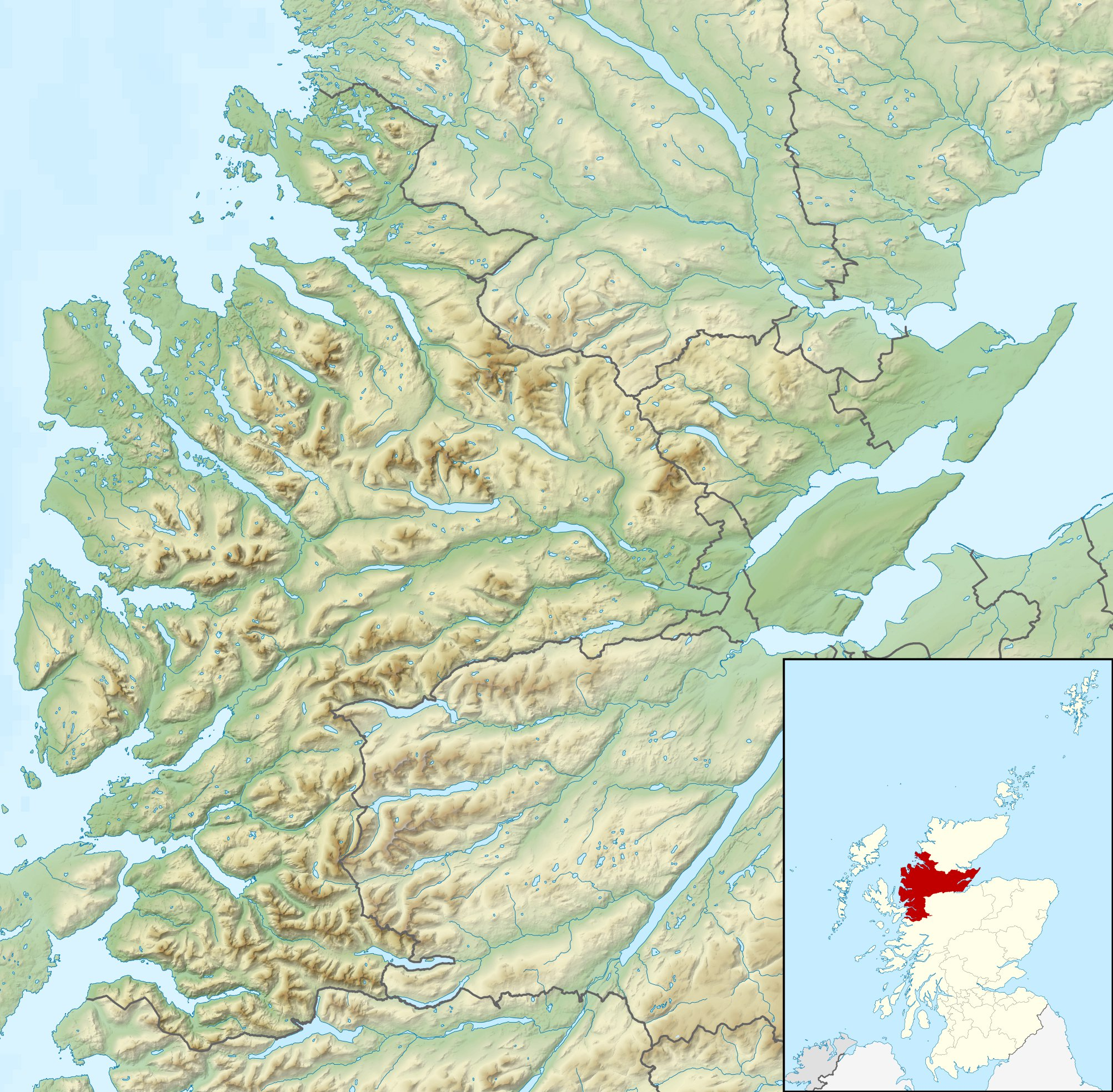
- Location within Ross and Cromarty
- Location: Easter Ross, Scotland
- Coordinates: 57.67912°N 4.57922°W
- Area: 23 km^{2} (8.9 sq mi)
- Established: 1982
- Governing body: NatureScot
- Website: Ben Wyvis National Nature Reserve

Ben Wyvis is home to over 170 plant species, including the nationally scarce dwarf birch, as well as other rare species, such as alpine foxtail. The summit ridge of Ben Wyvis is carpeted moss-heath, forming one of the longest single tracts of this habitat anywhere in Britain. The summit plateau is dominated by the woolly hair-moss Racomitrium lanuginosum, whilst little shaggy moss Rhytidiadelphus loreus is found in areas that experience regular snow cover due to drifting. The lower slopes of the mountain support dwarf shrub heath and boglands, which are home to a variety of plants including dwarf birch, cloudberry, dwarf cornel and alpine bearberry.

Several species of butterfly are found at Ben Wyvis, including the pearl-bordered fritillary and the large heath butterfly. The area is also home to several species of dragonfly including the large red damselfly and the golden-ringed dragonfly. The mountain is an important breeding ground for the dotterel, which use the moss-heath of the plateau to breed: Ben Wyvis represents at least 2.4% of the breeding population for dotterel in Great Britain. Rock ptarmigan also breed on upland areas of the reserve, nesting in higher areas among the boulders and scree. Other birds at Ben Wyvis include European golden plover, red grouse and common ravens, as well as birds of prey such as peregrine falcon and golden eagle.

Deer are common at Ben Wyvis, with Scottish red deer in particular being frequently seen. Sika deer can be occasionally spotted at the edges of the woodland that fringe the area, with roe deer also preferring the cover of the forest. Other mammals at Ben Wyvis include mountain hare on the open slopes, and pine marten in the woodland. Deer numbers are managed via an annual cull in order to reduce grazing pressures on vegetation. Culling at Ben Wyvis is undertaken by a leaseholder, who rents the deer stalking rights from NatureScot.

=== Ben Wyvis National Nature Reserve ===
The Ben Wyvis National Nature Reserve encompasses the western and southern slopes of Ben Wyvis, and the summit plateau of Glas Leathad Mòr, which stands at 1,046 metres above sea level. Managed by NatureScot, the reserve contains a range of important habitats for wildlife, as well as important geological features. The reserve habitats range from scattered native woodland and shrub-rich heath on the lower slopes, moorland further upland, and a mosaic of upland communities on the high tops and crags.

The Reserve was established in 1982, and extended to include additional land on the southern and western side of the mountain in 1985. In 1996 the boundary was altered again, excluding land that was not owned by NatureScot from the reserve. The NNR is classified as a Category II protected area by the International Union for Conservation of Nature. Ben Wyvis is also designated as a Special Protection Area (SPA), a Special Area of Conservation (SAC), and a Site of Special Scientific Interest (SSSI).

== Tourism ==
Ben Wyvis is usually climbed from the west, starting just south of Garbat on the A835 road, where there is a car park maintained by Forestry and Land Scotland. The path follows the north bank of the Allt a' Bhealaich Mhòir through the forest, before entering the NNR. From here the route ascends more steeply to reach An Cabar, the southernmost of the summits that lie along the main ridge. An alternative route, also accessed from the car park, takes in the Top of Tom a' Choinnich, which lies to the north of the main summit: the two routes can be combined to make a circular route.

The popularity of Ben Wyvis with visitors, coupled with the fact that moss-heath is much more susceptible to damage than grass or heather, has led to significant erosion on the main ascent route. On the summit plateau the path has become "braided" into several adjacent routes. Since 2011 NatureScot have been undertaking restoration work; on slopes leading to the summit plateau this has involved the use of traditional path-building techniques. On the summit plateau, however, NatureScot have trialled an alternative method, encouraging the use of a single route to allow bare areas to recover by removing loose stones and transplanting small sections of vegetation.

During the 1980s there were proposals for the construction of downhill skiing infrastructure on Ben Wyvis.

== Footnotes ==
=== Bibliography ===
- "The Story of Ben Wyvis National Nature Reserve" (PDF). Scottish Natural Heritage. 2008.
