= Hector Munro, 13th Baron of Foulis =

Hector Munro, 13th Baron of Foulis was a Scottish clan chief of the highland Clan Munro in Ross-shire. He is by tradition 13th Baron of Foulis and 16th overall chief of the clan. However, he is only the 6th chief of the Clan Munro who can be proved by contemporary evidence.

== Lands and charters ==
Hector was the eldest son of William Munro, 12th Baron of Foulis who died in 1505. Hector was so young when he succeeded to his estates that management of the estates was attended to by his relatives. In 1514/15 after attaining his majority, Hector Munro was appointed Lieutenant along with John Mackenzie, 9th of Kintail, chief of Clan Mackenzie, for the protection of Wester Ross. They were to protect the lands from the incursion of Sir Donald MacDonald of Lochalsh, chief of the Clan MacDonald of Lochalsh, who at that time proclaimed himself Lord of the Isles.

There is a charter under the Great Seal of Scotland, dated 10 December 1516 to Hector Munro of Foulis, granting him the salmon fishing in the Kyle of Oykel, between the counties of Ross and Sutherland upon the resignation of the same subjects in his favour by Sir Donald MacDonald of Lochalsh. Hector Munro also acquired by charter dated at Glengarry 2 October 1524, from Margaret MacDonald of the Isles, sister of Sir Donald MacDonald of Lochalsh, with the consent of her husband Alexander MacDonald, 6th of Glengarry, chief of the Clan MacDonell of Glengarry, part of the lands of Lochalsh, Lochcarron, Lochbroom, and Feorin-Coscarrie, in Breachatt and superior of the lands of Creichmore and fishings of the Killis Ockell. She further sold and confirmed to her cousin, Hector Munro of Foulis, the half of the lands of Inveran, Linisetroy, Linisetmore, Altasbeg, Altasmore and Auchness for a certain sum of money delivered to her for her need and urgent necessity. These grants were further confirmed to Hector Munro at Court by king James V of Scotland by charter dated at Stirling on 20 April 1541.

A charter found at Cawdor Castle between the Knight of Calder and others dated at Inverness on 30 April 1527 includes Hector Munro of Foulis as one of the subscribers. There is also a bond of manrent between Hector Munro and Hugh Fraser, 5th Lord Lovat dated 19 March 1529.

Different sources give different dates of death for Hector Munro. The Martine MS written by George Martine in the late 17th century gives the date as 1549. However, contemporary records, the Munro Writs of Foulis, give the date as 8 March 1541. Hector died at Culrain in the parish of Kincardine and his remains were interred in the ancestral burying ground in the Chanonry of Ross.

== Family and descendants ==
Hector Munro, 13th Baron married firstly Catherine, daughter of Kenneth Mackenzie, 7th of Kintail, chief of the Clan Mackenzie. They had two sons:

1. Robert Munro, 14th Baron of Foulis (heir and successor).
2. Hugh Munro of Contullich, appears to have died unmarried.

Hector Munro married secondly Catherine, daughter of John Macleod of Lewis, chief of the Clan MacLeod of Lewis, but without issue. However, Hector Munro, 13th Baron of Foulis is known to have had three illegitimate sons from whom several large Munro families are descended and had land granted to them in Ross-shire.

1. Hugh Munro, 1st of Little Findon.
2. Robert Munro, 1st of Killichoan.
3. John Roy Munro, the "red", 1st of Wester Fyrish.
