= William Munro, 12th Baron of Foulis =

Scottish Knight and Scottish clan chief

Sir William Munro of Foulis (died 1505) was a Scottish Knight and Scottish clan chief of the highland Clan Munro. He is by tradition the 12th Baron of Foulis and 15th overall chief of the clan. However, he is actually only the 5th chief of the Clan Munro who can be proved by contemporary evidence.

== Early life ==
William Munro was the eldest son of John Munro, 11th Baron of Foulis, a Crown Chamberlain. As heir to his father, he was given sasine of his lands in 1491 as recorded by contemporary documents, the Munro Writs of Foulis. William Munro is said to have been knighted by king James IV of Scotland and appears in a document as "Sir" William in 1503. Sir William Munro was the king’s Lieutenant and Justicary of Inverness and the Earldom Ross.

== Clan battles ==
There are two traditional stories of clan battles involving the Clan Munro during William's chieftaincy. Both are called the Battle of Drumchatt but there does not appear to be any contemporary evidence for either of the battles.

The first is said to have taken place in 1497 when Alexander MacDonald of Lochalsh rebelled against the king. He invaded Ross-shire and was defeated in battle at Drumchatt by the Munros and Mackenzies, who were the king's allies. This version of events is recorded by early 19th-century historian Donald Gregory and seems to be accepted by modern historians. However, late 19th-century historian Alexander Mackenzie disputes the Munro’s presence at the battle.

The second battle at Drumchatt is said to have taken place in 1501 and was fought between the Munros and Mackenzies. According to Alexander Mackenzie, Sir William Munro led a force of 900 men to attack the Mackenzies but were defeated by just 140 Mackenzies. However, there is no historical evidence for this story.

== Rebellion of Donald Dubh ==
In the early 16th century Donald Dubh, chief of Clan Donald rebelled against the king. The Clan Donald chiefs were no longer Earls of Ross or Lords of the Isles. Sir William Munro of Foulis was commissioned to let the King's lands of Lochaber and Mamore to "true men," as recorded in the Register of the Privy Seal of Scotland, 21 March 1501/02. The Earl of Huntly, chief of Clan Gordon and Lord Lovat, chief of Clan Fraser of Lovat were also ordered to proceed against the rebels. Cameron of Lochiel, chief of Clan Cameron supported the rebel Donald Dubh. Sir William Munro was slain by Cameron of Lochiel at Achnashellach in 1505. Clan Cameron tradition is that they defeated a joint force from the Clan Munro and Clan Mackay at the Battle of Achnashellach.

One 17th-century account states that William was killed by treachery: William Munro of Foulis, a knight most valiant for leading an army at the command of the King against certain factious northern men, perished by treachery.

Another historian from the early 18th century states that Munro was killed by Cameron, adding that: "the house was surrounded and refused to surrender".

== Family ==
Sir William Munro of Foulis had married Anne, daughter of Lachlan Og Maclean of Duart Castle, chief of Clan Maclean. They had three children:

1. Hector Munro, 13th Baron of Foulis (heir and successor as chief of the Clan Munro).
2. William Munro, Vicar of Dingwall.
3. Margaret Munro.
