= John Stewart of Ardvorlich =

Scottish military officer, historian and author

Arms of the Stewarts of Ardvorlich

Major John Alexander MacLaren Stewart, 14th of Ardvorlich (25 March 1904 – 11 May 1985) was a Scottish military officer, historian and the author of several authoritative works on the history of various Scottish clans.

== Published works ==
His works include The Stewarts: The Highland branches of a royal name, The Camerons: A History of Clan Cameron, and The Grahams.

His 344-page work The Camerons: A History of Clan Cameron was published by the Clan Cameron Association in 1971, and highly praised by Colonel Sir Donald Hamish Cameron of Lochiel, the Clan Chief at the time and Stewart’s brother-in-law. Considered "the definitive book on the clan" by present-day Camerons, it is proudly sold at The Clan Cameron Museum at Achnacarry.

He has also produced a History of the Ardvorlich Stewarts, his own direct family, which was published privately and its copies never offered to the general public, or even to specialised researchers. A copy exists with the Stewart Society and another with the Public Library in Edinburgh, with remaining copies believed to be preserved only in possession of family members. Family members are rather secretive about it, with outsiders being only shown "select pages" of the book.

John Stewart's researches unearthed considerable information on the history of his own ancestors and those of other renowned Scottish families and clans, which he interpreted in a romantic manner - as is evident, for example, in the following excerpt from The Grahams (Grahams of Montrose):

It is remarkable that the early Grahams were one and all exceedingly capable men. In an age when the reputation of many great public figures, and, alas, that of most of the Scottish nobility, were sullied by deeds of violence, and often, deeds of blackest treachery, it is refreshing to find that the Grahams stand out as loyal and true to the causes they espoused. Their story is not one of a rapid rise to power through the Royal favour, or even at the expense of their peers, but rather a gradual but steady rise based on their undoubted ability and worthiness which seems to have endured from one generation to another.

== Family ==
Stewart married Violet Hermione Cameron, eldest daughter of Sir Donald Walter Cameron of Lochiel and Lady Hermione (née Graham), daughter of the 5th Duke of Montrose. They had one daughter, Mary Hermione Stewart, who married and had issue.

== See also ==
- Stewart of Balquhidder
