= Knockfarrel =

Village in Ross-shire, Scotland

Coordinates: 57.58833°N 4.49264°W

Knockfarrel: Scottish Gaelic: Cnoc Fhearghalaigh
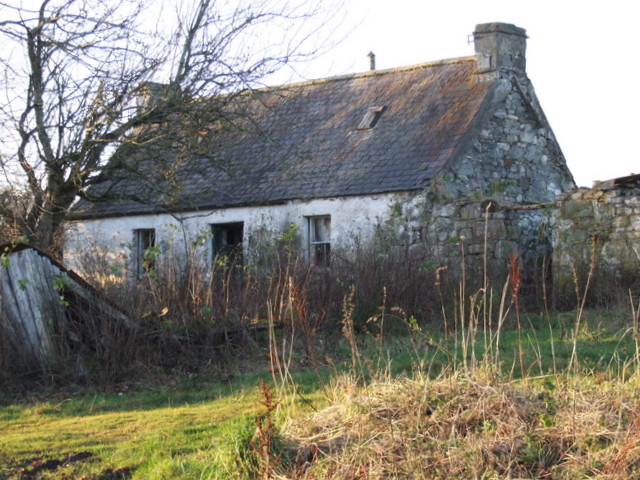
- Abandoned crofthouse near Knockfarrel

- Location within the Ross and Cromarty area
- OS grid reference: NH510581
- Council area: Highland
- Country: Scotland
- Sovereign state: United Kingdom
- Post town: Dingwall
- Postcode district: IV15 9
- Police: Scotland
- Fire: Scottish
- Ambulance: Scottish

Knockfarrel (Scottish Gaelic: Cnoc Fearghalaigh) is a rural settlement, 1 mile east of Strathpeffer, in Dingwall in Ross-shire, Scottish Highlands and is in the Scottish council area of Highland.

Knockfarrel or Knock Farrel, or indeed Knock Farril (stone fort) is a vitrified pictish Iron Age fort which lies on the knockfarrel hill, immediately to the north of the settlement, and which it gave its name to the settlement. The walk up to the fort is a popular tourist attraction.

The settlement once had a large enough population to have its own shinty club which then amalgamated with Strathpeffer's to create Caberfeidh in 1886.
