= Alexander Mackenzie (historian) =

Scottish author and politician (1838–1898)

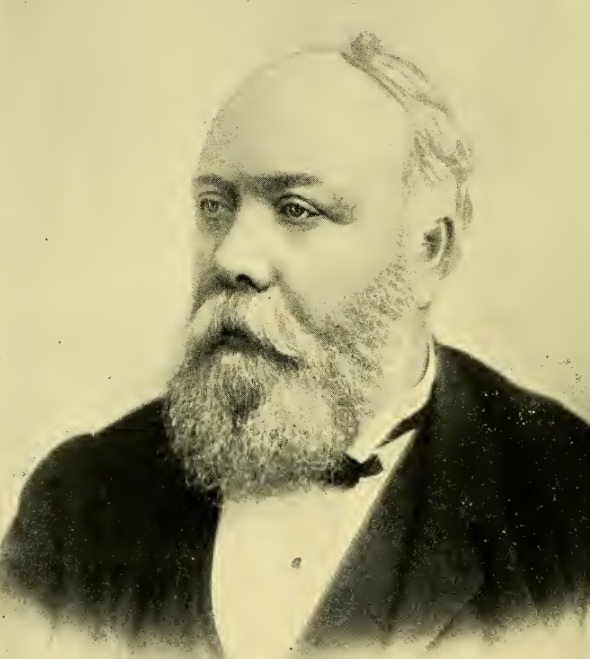
- Born: 25 December 1838; Gairloch, Wester Ross,
- Died: 22 January 1898 (aged 59)
- Occupations: Historian and political campaigner

Alexander Mackenzie (25 December 1838 – 22 January 1898) was a Scottish historian, author, magazine editor and politician.

== Early life and career ==
Mackenzie was born on 25 December 1838 in Park House, a croft in Gairloch, Wester Ross, Scotland, to Hector (1810–1908) and Catherine Mackenzie (née Campbell; 1812–1882). He had little opportunity for education and initially earned his living as a labourer and ploughman. In 1861, he became apprenticed in the clothes trade selling Scottish cloth in Colchester, England.

In 1869 he settled in Inverness, where he and his brother William set up a clothes shop in Clach na Cudainn House. From his business premises, he derived his nickname 'Clach na Cudainn' or, simply, 'Clach'.

By 1876, he was contributing reports to the Daily Free Press. He later became an editor and publisher of the Celtic Magazine and the Scottish Highlander.

Mackenzie wrote numerous clan histories. He was a fellow of the Society of Antiquaries of Scotland. A founder member of the Gaelic Society of Inverness, Mackenzie was elected Honorary Chieftain in 1894.

== The Highland clearances and land reform ==
In the 1880s, Mackenzie became actively involved in the Highland land issue and campaigned for security of tenure for crofters. In Nuair Chaidh na Ceithir Ùr Oirre, Màiri Mhòr nan Òran describes going with him, Charles Fraser-Mackintosh and others to elicit the support of Mrs. MacRae of Stromeferry for their cause and affectionately tells how "the Clach" discouraged 17-stone Màiri from getting into a rowing boat with the others. First published in 1883, MacKenzie's History of the Highland Clearances has remained in print to the present times. John Prebble wrote "...it has been and will remain a book to be read, an essential part of any study of the clearances".

== Personal life ==
He married on 3 August 1865 Emma Sarah Rose, author of Tales of the Heather, with whom he had nine issue:

- Hector Rose (b. 25 February 1867)
- Thomas William (b. 4 August 1875)
- Alastair Ian (b. 30 December 1880)
- Kenneth John (b. 17 October 1885)
- Catharine Anne (24 February – 1 August 1868)
- Annie Emma
- Catharine (died in infancy in 1873)
- Mary Rose
- Emma Barabel

== Death ==
Mackenzie died on 22 January 1898, aged 59.

== Bibliography ==
- Mackenzie, Alexander (1878). Historical Tales and Legends of the Highlands. Inverness: A. & W. Mackenzie.
- Mackenzie, Alexander (1881). History of the Macdonalds and Lords of the Isles; with genealogies of the principal families of the name. Inverness: A. & W. Mackenzie.
- Mackenzie, Alexander (1884). History of the Camerons, with genealogies of the principal families of the name. Inverness: A. & W. Mackenzie.
- Mackenzie, Alexander (1888). The prophecies of the Brahan seer, Coinneach Odhar Fiosaiche (4th, much enlarged ed.). Inverness: A. & W. Mackenzie.
- Mackenzie, Alexander (1894). History of the Mackenzies: With Genealogies of the Principal Families of the Name (New, revised, extended ed.). Inverness: A. & W. Mackenzie.
- Mackenzie, Alexander (1891). History of the Chisholms : with genealogies of the principal families of the name. Inverness: A. & W. Mackenzie.
- Mackenzie, Alexander (1896). History of the Frasers of Lovat, with genealogies of the principal families of the name: to which is added those of Dunballoch and Phopachy. Inverness: A. & W. Mackenzie.
- Mackenzie, Alexander (1898). History of the Munros of Fowlis with genealogies of the principal families of the name: to which are added those of Lexington and New England. Inverness: A. & W. Mackenzie.
- Mackenzie, Alexander (1914). The history of the Highland clearances (2nd, altered and revised ed.). Stirling: Eneas Mackay.

== See also ==
- Brahan Seer
