= Chiefs of Clan Munro =

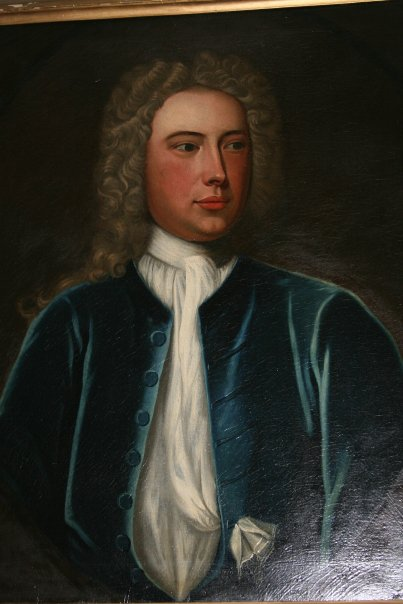
Sir Robert Munro, 6th Baronet of Foulis. Traditionally 24th Baron and 27th chief of the Clan Munro

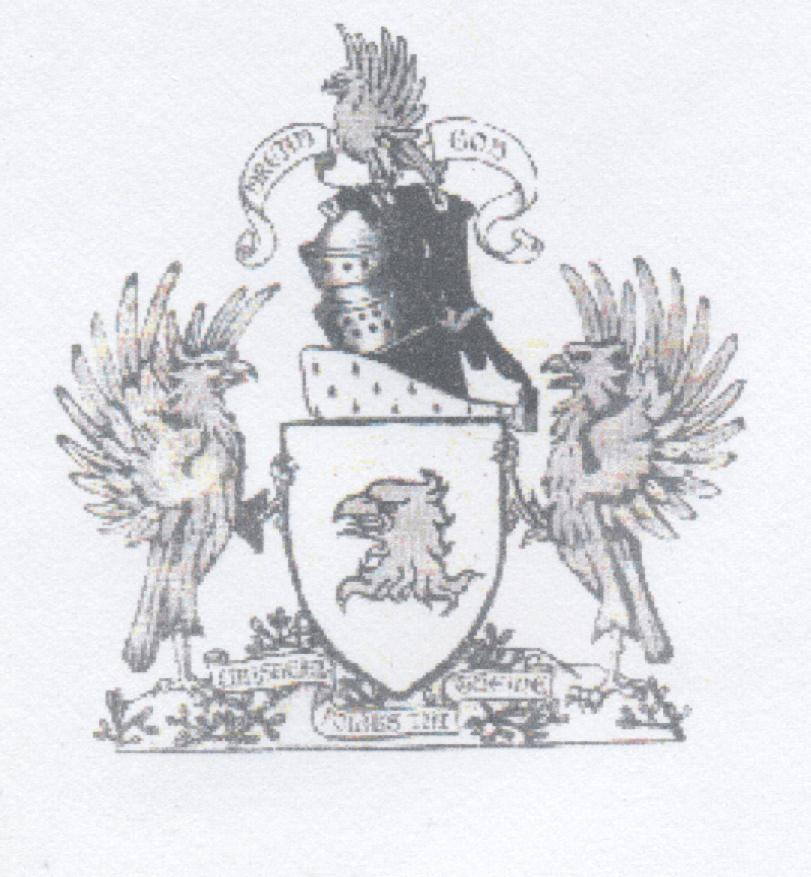
Munro of Foulis coat of arms

The chiefs of the Scottish highland Clan Munro, the Munros of Foulis, are according to tradition, descended from a Donald Munro of Foulis who died in 1039. However, their descent can only be proved by contemporary evidence back to a Robert de Munro who died in 1369.

According to 19th-century historian Alexander Mackenzie, the chiefs of the Clan Munro are from as early as the 12th century designated Barons of Foulis. However, although the family line can be proved back to Robert de Munro (d.1369) by contemporary evidence, it cannot be proved that they were all actually Barons before they were made Baronets by Charles I in the 1630s. Strictly speaking Robert Mor Munro (d.1588) who Mackenzie designates the 15th Baron was the first true Baron although the Munro chiefs had previously held their lands from the Earl of Ross and directly from the crown for centuries before that.

In the 1630s, Hector Munro of Foulis, traditionally the 19th Baron and 22nd chief of the clan was made a Baronet by king Charles I, thus becoming Sir Hector Munro, 1st Baronet of Foulis. In 1651, Sir Hector Munro, 2nd Baronet of Foulis died without issue. He was succeeded by his cousin Sir Robert Munro, 3rd Baronet, the eldest male representative of the Munro of Obsdale branch of the Clan Munro, who are descended from chief Robert Mor Munro, 15th Baron of Foulis (d.1588).

In 1848, Sir Hugh Munro, 8th Baronet of Foulis died leaving an only daughter. He was succeeded by his cousin Sir Charles Munro, 9th Baronet who was in fact the eldest male representative of the Munro of Culrain branch of the clan. The Munros of Culrain descend from George Munro, 1st of Newmore who was a son of Col. John Munro, 2nd of Obsdale, who was in turn a grandson of chief Robert Mor Munro, 15th Baron of Foulis (d.1588). Some modern historians have claimed that the Munros of Culcairn, who are descended from George Munro, 1st of Culcairn, who was in turn a son of Sir Robert Munro, 5th Baronet (d.1729) should have become chiefs. It has been claimed, although not proven that because the Munro of Culcairn family was living in London, England, it was assumed that they had died out, even though they had not.

In 1935, Chief Sir Hector Munro, 11th Baronet died and was succeeded to the chiefship of the Clan Munro by his daughter, Eva Marion Munro. However, the Baronetcy was succeeded to by Sir George Hamilton Munro, 12th Baronet, grandson Sir Charles Munro, 9th Baronet. Therefore, the chiefship of the Clan Munro and Baronetcy of Foulis became separated as the baronetcy could not pass to a female. See article: Munro Baronets.

Eva Marion Munro married Col C. H. Gascoigne. Their son, Patrick (1912–1995), took his mother's maiden name, Munro, in order to become chief of the clan. The current chief of the clan is Patrick's son, Hector William Munro of Foulis (b. 1950).

== Chiefs ==
=== Modern line ===
| Name | Died | Notes |
|---|---|---|
| Finnian Munro | - | The younger of Foulis, eldest son of the present chief. |
| Hector W. Munro | - | The Present Chief. |
| Capt. Patrick Munro | 1995 | Son of Eva Marion Munro and C. H. Gascoigne, took his mother's maiden name to become chief. |
| Eva Marion Munro | 1976 | eldest daughter of 11th baronet married Col C. H. Gascoigne. |

=== Foulis line ===
| Name | Died | Notes |
|---|---|---|
| Sir Hector Munro, 11th Baronet of Foulis | 1935 | Colonel in the Seaforth Highlanders ADC to Edward VII & George V - end of male line. |
| Sir Charles Munro, 10th Baronet of Foulis | 1888 | Deputy Lieutenant & J.P. for Ross-shire. |
| Sir Charles Munro, 9th Baronet of Foulis | 1886 | Of the Munro of Culrain branch, descended from John Munro, 2nd of Obsdale and Chief Robert Mor Munro 15th Baron of Foulis. Married Amelia, daughter of Frederick Browne. |
| Sir Hugh Munro, 8th Baronet of Foulis | 1848 | End of direct line. Married Jane, daughter of Alexander Law. |
| Sir Harry Munro, 7th Baronet of Foulis | 1781 | Rebuilt Foulis Castle after a fire destroyed it - MP for Ross-shire 1746 - 47. Married Anne, daughter of Hugh Rose of Kilravock Castle. |
| Sir Robert Munro, 6th Baronet of Foulis | 1746 | Colonel in the Black Watch - killed at the Battle of Falkirk Muir, interred in the Churchyard of Falkirk next to John de Graham. Married Mary, daughter of Sir Henry Seymour of Woodlands. |
| Sir Robert Munro, 5th Baronet of Foulis | 1729 | The Blind Baron. Married Jean, daughter of John Forbes of Culloden. |
| Sir John Munro, 4th Baronet of Foulis | 1697 | The Presbyterian Mortar Piece. Married Agnes, daughter of Kenneth Mackenzie, 3rd Earl of Seaforth. |
| Sir Robert Munro, 3rd Baronet of Foulis | 1668 | Great-grandson of Chief Robert-Mor Munro, 15th Baron of Foulis and eldest surviving son of Col. John Munro, 2nd of Obsdale. |

=== Original of Foulis line ===
| Name | Died | Notes |
|---|---|---|
| Sir Hector Munro, 2nd Baronet of Foulis | 1651 | Died age 17 - ending direct male line. |
| Sir Hector Munro, 1st Baronet of Foulis | 1635 | Brother of Robert. Made 1st baronet by Charles I of England Died in Hamburg, Germany. Married Mary, daughter of Huistean Du Mackay, 13th of Strathnaver of Farr and Strathnaver. |
| Robert Munro, 18th Baron of Foulis | 1633 | The Black Baron served in the 30 years war - died at Ulm, Germany. Married Margaret, daughter of William Sutherland, 9th of Duffus. |
| Hector Munro, 17th Baron of Foulis | 1603 | Brother of Robert. Married Anne, daughter of Hugh Fraser, 5th Lord Lovat. |
| Robert Munro, 16th Baron of Foulis | 1589 | Died 8 months after his father. |
| Robert Mor Munro, 15th Baron of Foulis | 1588 | Known as Mor due to his large stature. A loyal protector of Mary, Queen of Scots, - first Protestant and first to be buried at Kiltearn Church. Married Margaret, daughter of James Ogilvy of Cardell. Robert later married a daughter of Alexander Ross of Balnagowan. |
| Robert Munro, 14th Baron of Foulis | 1547 | Married Margaret, daughter of Sir Alexander Dunbar of Westfield. Loyal supporter of Scotland against invasion of Protector, Duke of Somerset - killed at the Battle of Pinkie |
| Hector Munro, 13th Baron of Foulis | 1541 | Extensive lands confirmed to him by James V of Scotland at Stirling 1541. Married Kathrine, daughter of Kenneth Mackenzie, 7th of Kintail |
| William Munro, 12th Baron of Foulis | 1505 | Justicary and Lieutenant of Inverness and the Earldom of Ross. Married Anne, daughter of Lachlan Og Maclean of Duart Castle. Killed in a raid assisting Chief of the Mackays at the Battle of Achnashellach |
| John Munro, 11th Baron of Foulis | 1490 | In minority was under his uncle John Munro, I of Milntown who led the Clan at the Battle of Clachnaharry 1454, married Margaret, daughter of Sir William Calder of Calder. |
| George Munro, 10th Baron of Foulis | 1452 | Under the Great Seal of James I of Scotland, dated at St. Andrews 1426 - lands of great extent confirmed to him, killed at Battle of Bealach nam Broig. Married a daughter of Alexander MacCulloch of Plaids |
| Hugh Munro, 9th Baron of Foulis | 1425 | Joined Donald of Islay, Lord of the Isles in contest with Robert Stewart, Duke of Albany at the Battle of Harlaw 1411. Married Isabel, daughter of John Keith of 1st of Inverugie Castle. |
| Robert de Munro, 8th Baron of Foulis | 1369 | A charter confirmed by David II of Scotland 1364. First married Jean, daughter of Ross of Balnagowan Castle. Later married a daughter of the laird of Forrester of Corstorphine. |

=== Traditional chiefs ===
The earliest ten chiefs of the Clan Munro cannot be confirmed by contemporary evidence. George Munro traditionally the 7th Baron is recorded as the first chief in the Munro MS history written by George Martine between 1673 and 1697. Robert Munro traditionally the 6th Baron is recorded as receiving a charter during the reign of Robert the Bruce in William Robertson's Index of Charters, compiled in 1629 and published in 1798, but this charter cannot be found. George Munro traditionally the 5th Baron is recorded by 18th-century historian Alexander Nisbet as being on a charter of the early 13th century but this charter cannot be found either.

| Name | Died | Comments |
|---|---|---|
| George Munro, 7th Baron of Foulis | 1333 | Succeeded his grandfather - continued his support of Bruce, killed at the Battle of Halidon Hill. Married a daughter of Ross of Balnagown Castle. |
| George Munro | 1314 | Only son of Robert - predeceased his father, was killed at the Battle of Bannockburn. Married a daughter of Kenneth de Moravia, 4th Earl of Sutherland. |
| Robert Munro, 6th Baron of Foulis | 1323 | Joined the party of King Robert the Bruce, led the clan at Bannockburn in 1314. |
| George Munro, 5th Baron of Foulis | 1282 | Had all his Ross-shire lands confirmed to him by charter from Alexander II of Scotland before 1249. |
| Robert Munro, 4th Baron of Foulis | 1239 | Married daughter of the Earl of Sutherland. |
| Donald Munro, 3rd Baron of Foulis | 1195 | Said to have built the old Tower of Foulis 1154. Assisted William the Lion in repressing rebellion. |
| Robert Munro, 2nd Baron of Foulis | 1164 | Loyal subject of David I of Scotland and Malcolm IV of Scotland - Interred in Church of Chanonry of Ross - burial place of Munros for 400 years. |
| Hugh Munro, 1st Baron of Foulis | 1126 | First member of the line "Baron of Foulis". |
| George Munro | 1101 | Assisted Malcolm III of Scotland in contention with Macbeth for Crown of Scotland. |
| Donald Munro | 1039 | Founder of the ancient House of Munro. |

== See also ==
- Clan Munro
- Munro Baronets
- Foulis Castle
