= List of listed buildings in Kiltearn =

This is a list of listed buildings in the parish of Kiltearn in the Highland council area of Scotland. This includes the village of Evanton and an area extending towards Dingwall and Alness.

== List ==
Name	Location	Date Listed	Grid Ref. (Note: Sometimes known as OSGB36, the grid reference (where provided) is based on the British national grid reference system used by the Ordnance Survey. • "Guide to National Grid". Ordnance Survey. • "Get-a-map". Ordnance Survey.)	Geo-coordinates	Notes	LB Number (Note: Historic Environment Scotland assign a unique alphanumeric identifier to each designated site in Scotland, for listed buildings this always begins with "LB", for example "LB12345".)	Image
Wyvis Lodge, Stables And Game Larders				57°43′41″N 4°32′43″W	Category A	7906	Upload another image
Foulis Castle				57°38′41″N 4°21′54″W	Category A	7911	Upload another image See more images
Foulis Castle Gate Piers				57°38′48″N 4°21′52″W	Category C(S)	7912	Upload another image
Foulis Castle Mains				57°38′44″N 4°22′06″W	Category B	7913	Upload Photo
Ardullie Lodge				57°37′43″N 4°22′09″W	Category B	7903	Upload another image
Novar House Entrance Gates (West)				57°40′36″N 4°18′47″W	Category B	7905	Upload Photo
Mountgerald				57°37′16″N 4°23′42″W	Category B	7919	Upload Photo
Granary, Foulis Point (Storehouse of Foulis)				57°38′25″N 4°20′51″W	Category A	7914	Upload Photo
Kiltearn Manse Steading (Former Steading, Now Dwelling)				57°39′22″N 4°19′15″W	Category B	7916	Upload Photo
Newton Of Novar				57°40′14″N 4°18′58″W	Category B	7920	Upload Photo
Drummond, Former Free Church Manse, Now Community Centre				57°39′34″N 4°20′32″W	Category C(S)	7904	Upload Photo
Evanton, Former Secession Chapel				57°39′52″N 4°20′33″W	Category B	7864	Upload Photo
Kiltearn Old Parish Church And Burial Ground				57°39′20″N 4°19′12″W	Category B	7915	Upload another image
Lemlair				57°37′38″N 4°23′07″W	Category B	7918	Upload Photo
Kiltearn Former Manse Barn				57°39′24″N 4°19′11″W	Category C(S)	7917	Upload Photo

== Key ==
The scheme for classifying buildings in Scotland is:

- Category A: "buildings of national or international importance, either architectural or historic; or fine, little-altered examples of some particular period, style or building type."
- Category B: "buildings of regional or more than local importance; or major examples of some particular period, style or building type, which may have been altered."
- Category C: "buildings of local importance; lesser examples of any period, style, or building type, as originally constructed or moderately altered; and simple traditional buildings which group well with other listed buildings."

In March 2016 there were 47,288 listed buildings in Scotland. Of these, 8% were Category A, and 50% were Category B, with the remaining 42% being Category C.

== See also ==
- List of listed buildings in Highland
