= Hector Munro =

Hector Munro or Monro may refer to:

- Hector Munro, 13th Baron of Foulis (died 1541), Scottish clan chief
- Hector Munro, 17th Baron of Foulis (died 1603), Scottish clan chief
- Sir Hector Munro, 1st Baronet (died 1635), Scottish soldier, noble and clan chief
- Sir Hector Munro, 2nd Baronet (1635–1651), Scottish noble and clan chief
- General Sir Hector Munro, 8th laird of Novar (1726–1805), Scottish noble and ninth Commander-in-Chief of India, 1764–1765
- Hector William Munro (1769–1821), British Governor of Trinidad, 1811–1813
- Hector Munro (surveyor) (1859–1930),
- Hector Hugh Munro (1870–1916), British writer known by the pen name Saki
- Colonel Sir Hector Munro, 11th Baronet (1848–1935), 32nd Chief of Clan Munro
- Hector Monro, Baron Monro of Langholm (1922–2006), Scottish Conservative & Unionist Party politician
- Hector Munro (cricketer) (1920–2014), English cricketer
