= Robert Mor Munro, 15th Baron of Foulis =

Scottish chief (died 1588)

Robert Mor Munro, 15th Baron of Foulis (died 1588), and 18th chief of the Clan Munro was a 16th-century Scottish chief. He was known as Robert Mor on account of his large stature. He was the eldest son of Robert Munro, 14th Baron of Foulis. Although this Robert Munro is traditionally 15th Baron and 18th overall chief of the clan, he is only the 8th Munro chief that can be proved by contemporary evidence.

== Lands and charters ==
In 1550, Robert Mor Munro, 15th Baron is recorded in a bond of manrent and friendship with George Gordon, 4th Earl of Huntly, chief of Clan Gordon. The document dated 1550 is found amongst the papers in the charter chest of Gordon Castle. However, later Robert Mor Munro would support Mary, Queen of Scots in her feud against the Gordon House of Huntly.

In 1552, Robert Mor Munro sold lands in Wester Fowlis to Margaret Ogilvie, Lady of Moy who was the widow of William Mackintosh, 15th chief of Clan Mackintosh who had been executed at Aberdeen in 1550. In 1553, Queen Mary also granted a Crown charter of the same lands to Margaret Ogilvie. Later, Robert Mor Munro's first marriage would be to Margaret Ogilvie which would bring back to him these lands.

== Mary, Queen of Scots and Inverness Castle ==
In the Parliament held at Edinburgh on 1 August 1560, amongst the names of those present is "Robert Munro of Fowlis". Robert Mor Munro was a staunch supporter and faithful friend of Mary, Queen of Scots and he consequently was treated favourably by her son James VI. George Buchanan states, that when the unfortunate princess went to Inverness in 1562 and found the gates of the castle shut against her; "as soon as they heard of their sovereign's danger, a great number of the most eminent Scots poured in around her, especially the Frasers and Munros, who were esteemed the most valiant of the clans inhabiting those countries in the north". These two clans took Inverness Castle for the Queen, which had refused her admission. The Queen later hanged the governor, a Gordon who had refused her admission.

George Buchanan's account was originally written in Latin but was published in English by James Aikman in 1827, it reads:

Upon hearing of the danger of their princess, a great number of the ancient Scots, partly by persuasion, and partly of their own accord, flocked around her, particularly the Frasers and Monros, the bravest of these tribes. When the queen found herself sufficiently strong, she laid siege to the castle, which having neither a sufficient garrison, not being properly fortified for sustaining an attack, surrendered, when the commanders were executed, and the men dismissed.

According to one source the Clan Munro were among the clans who supported Mary, Queen of Scots in her victory over the Earl of Huntly at the Battle of Corrichie in 1562. In 1563, a charter was granted to Robert Mor Munro at Foulis Castle and was witnessed by his brother, George Munro and his great-uncle, William Munro, Vicar of Dingwall.

Later, on 23 June 1567, Robert was one of the jury in the general service of John Gordon, 11th Earl of Sutherland to be heir to his grandmother, Elizabeth Sutherland, Countess of Sutherland. John being the first Gordon to be Earl of Sutherland.

== Chanonry Castle ==
In 1569, a feud arose between the Clan Mackenzie and Clan Munro, who by this time were among the most powerful clans in Ross-shire. Andrew Munro, 5th of Milntown defended and held, for three years, Chanonry Castle, which he had received from the Regent Moray who died in 1569, against the Clan Mackenzie, at the expense of many lives on both sides. The feud was settled when the castle was handed over to the Mackenzies by an act of pacification.

Sir Robert Gordon (1580–1656) writes of the feud in his book A Genealogical History of the Earldom of Sutherland.:

The Munros defended and keipt the Castle for the space of thrie yeirs, with great slaughter on either syd, vntill it was delyvered to the Clanchenzie, by the Act of Pacification. And this wes the ground beginning of the feud and hartburning, which to this day, remaynes between the Clanchenzie and Munrois.

In about 1577/78 another feud arose with the Mackenzies due to a dispute between Thomas Fraser of Knockie, Tutor of Lord Lovat and Colin Cam Mackenzie, 11th of Kintail over the lands of Beauly Priory and the neighbouring estates to the north of it. Mackenzie assembled his followers and marched into the district with the intention of appropriating them to himself. Fraser of Knockie gathered his forces at Beauly and Munro of Foulis who was a friend of Fraser advanced with 300 of his followers to the banks of the River Conon. This formidable array alarmed Mackenzie, and he entered on peaceful negotiations.

== Sheriffs of Inverness ==
In 1571, 4 July, King James VI of Scotland granted to Robert Mor Munro all of the goods that belonged to Duncan Chalmers, Chancellor of Ross who had become a fugitive from the law for his part in the Battle of Langside and for the slaughter of James Balvany, William Purvis and Alexander Hume. As a reward for his faithful services to the Crown, Robert Mor Munro obtained from King James VI, a grant of all the customs due as royalties "furth of the town and Sheriffdom of Inverness", as registered under the Privy Seal, dated at Edinburgh on 5 January 1572.

Robert Mor Munro was also one of the members of a Commission appointed to act as Sheriffs of Inverness, for serving Alexander Gordon, 12th Earl of Sutherland, on 30 May 1573. The other members were Mackenzie of Kintail, Hugh Fraser, 5th Lord Lovat and Lachlan Mor Mackintosh, 16th of Mackintosh. During the minority of James VI of Scotland, which officially ended in 1578, Robert Mor Munro and Munro of Milntown had charge of the Crown lands of Ross and the Black Isle.

In 1584, King James II of Scotland confirmed another charter to Robert Munro of Foulis. In 1585, Robert Mor Munro signed a bond of manrent with George Gordon, 1st Marquess of Huntly to assist each other as allies against any person except for the King or Queen. In 1588, May 6, Robert Mor Munro of Foulis is listed along with other highland chiefs in a grant to give special protection to Alexander Gordon, 12th Earl of Sutherland, to protect his church lands in Caithness or elsewhere. Others included are Gordon of Huntly, Mackenzie of Kintail, Rose of Kilravock, Fraser of Lovat, Grant of Freuchie and Ross of Balnagowan. On 20 July 1588 Robert Mor Munro of Foulis was appointed by the King, collector, for Inverness-shire, which included Ross. He was to collect a tax for the repair of Edinburgh Castle. On the 27th of that month, Robert Mor Munro of Foulis along with Colin Cam Mackenzie of Kintail are appointed Commissioners for the shires of Inverness and Cromarty for the better administration of justice in these counties.

== Family and descendants ==
Robert Mor Munro first married Margaret Ogilvie, a daughter of the chief of Clan Ogilvy. Later Robert married Kathrine Ross, a daughter of the chief of Clan Ross of Balnagowan. Robert had a total of 13 children over two marriages. Robert died on 4 November 1588 at Foulis Castle. He was succeeded by his eldest son from his first marriage, Robert Munro, 16th Baron of Foulis. However, in the following century the head of the House of Foulis and chief of the Clan Munro would be succeeded to by descendants of his second marriage.

From Robert's marriage to Margaret Ogilvie:

1. Robert Munro, 16th Baron of Foulis.
2. Hugh Munro. (little is known, only found recorded once in the Coul MS)
3. Hector Munro, 17th Baron of Foulis, whose son was Robert Munro, 18th Baron of Foulis (The Black Baron).
4. Florence Munro, married Roderick Mackenzie of Redcastle.
5. Christian Munro.
6. Cathrine Munro, married William Ballie, Provost of Inverness.

From Robert's marriage to Kathrine Ross:

1. George Munro, 1st of Obsdale, whose grandson would succeed to the head of the house of Foulis: See: Sir Robert Munro, 3rd Baronet of Foulis.
2. John Munro, 1st of Meikle Daan.
3. Andrew Munro, 1st of Lemlair.
4. Margaret Munro, married Colin Campbell of Ardbreath.
5. Janet Munro, married James Innes of Inverbreakie.
6. Marjory Munro, married James Hepburn, merchant of Inverness.
7. Elizabeth Munro, married a minister of Kiltearn in Ross-shire.

Three historically important 17th century descendants of Robert Mor Munro are General Robert Monro and George Munro, 1st of Newmore who were both cadets of the Obsdale branch of the clan, and also John Munro of Lemlair.
