= Hector Munro, 17th Baron of Foulis =

Hector Munro, 17th Baron of Foulis (died 1603), also known as the master of Foulis, was a Scottish chief of the Highland, Scottish clan, Clan Munro. He is the 10th chief of Clan Munro who can be proved by contemporary evidence. He was seated at Foulis Castle.

== Early life in the church ==
Hector Munro, 17th Baron was the second son of Robert Mor Munro, 15th Baron of Foulis. Hector Munro became his father's heir after his elder brother Robert Munro, 16th Baron died in 1589 just eight months after their father, the 15th Baron.

In 1590, Hector Munro was served heir male of entail to his father in certain lands. This included the ten “Davochs” of Easter Fowlis (Foulis) as well as Wester Fowlis. He was also served heir to his father and brother for the “barony” of Fowlis at Inverness on 7 October 1590. He was also granted several other lands and salmon fishings in the Earldoms of Ross and Sutherland as well as in the Sheriffdom of Inverness.

Hector being originally a younger son of his father naturally studied for the church. His first preferment was the Chaplainry of Newmore which he was presented to by Mary, Queen of Scots in 1560. Hector's father Robert Mor Munro was a great supporter of Queen Mary.

In 1583, Hector Munro was appointed to the Chaplainry of Obsdale as is confirmed by a grant from James VI of Scotland. In the same year king James VI also granted to Hector Munro the Deanery of Ross, even though it was opposed by Alexander Urquhart, the former dean who had been deposed.

However upon the death of his older brother, Robert Munro, 16th Baron, Hector Munro resigned all of his ecclesiastical offices. Hector Munro then succeeded as chief of the Clan Munro.

In 1589, Hector Munro was served heir to his father of the lands of Inveran, with mill and salmon fishings, Linsetroy, Linsetmore, Altesbeg, Altesmor and Achness, with the salmon fishings. He was also given superiority of Creichmor and the fishings of the Oykel at the extent of £10. He was also served heir to his father to the lands of Contullich. Also in 1589, Hector Munro disponed the lands of Dann to his half brother John Munro.

== Witchcraft ==
Hector Munro, 17th Baron was born from his father's first marriage to Margaret Ogilvie. Upon the death of his first wife, Hector's father married secondly Katherine Ross, with whom he also had many children. Katherine Ross, who was Hector Munro's step mother was by many of her contemporaries believed to be a murderess, a poisoner and an employer of witches and sorcerers. She is said to have introduced her step son Hector Munro, 17th Baron to sinister practices. Shortly after her husband Robert Munro, 15th Baron's death in 1588, both she and Hector Munro stood separate trials for witchcraft and attempting to murder. Two local juries acquitted both of them on all of the charges, in apparent disregard for the evidence. The crimes with which Lady Munro of Foulis was charged were said to have been committed in the years 1576–7. The witches and warlocks were caught, tried and burned at the stake. One of the witches who was repeatedly mentioned at the trial, but who seems to have evaded capture had the unusual name of Marjorie (or Marionne) “Neyne McAllester alias Laskie Loucart”.

== Later life ==
On 9 March 1593 there is a commission, among others to Hector Munro, 17th Baron of Foulis, to apprehend George Gordon, 6th Earl of Huntly (later 1st Marquess), William Douglas, 10th Earl of Angus, Francis Hay, 9th Earl of Erroll, Sir Patrick Gordon of Auchindown, Sir James Chisholme of Dunborne, Mr James Gordon, Mr William Ogilvie and Mr Robert Abercromby for trafficking Paptists, “treasonable practices against the true religion of the realm”. Hector Munro was also to apprehend the persons responsible for the burning of Donibristle and the murder of James Stewart, 2nd Earl of Moray.

On 12 April 1595, a bond is signed at the Chanonry of Ross between Hector Munro of Foulis, Lachlan Mackintosh of Dunchton, John Grant of Freuchy and William Innes of Carossie.

Hector Munro, 17th Baron of Foulis was in great favour with king James VI of Scotland as in a letter from the king he writes of his “richt trustie friend the laird of Fowles”, in which the King takes notice of his loyalty and faithful service, and particularly recommends him to keep his men in good order, with several other affairs tending to the good and peace of the country.

The Battle of Logiebride took place on 4 February 1597, during Hector Munro's chieftaincy of the Clan Munro. It was fought between the Bains and Munros against the MacLeods and Mackenzies. However although it involved some clansmen of the Clan Munro, Hector Munro himself was not involved in the fight.

By an Act of the Privy Council of Scotland, dated 31 January 1602, Hector Munro of Foulis is ordered at the same time as the other principal Highland chiefs, to hold a general muster and "wapinshaw" of his followers on 10 March in that year, and to enroll the names of all the persons mustered, with the form and manner of their arms, and report the same to the King on an early date thereafter. Hector Munro is also ordered to levy and supply a hundred men to go to the assistance of Queen Elizabeth I of England in repressing the rebellion of her Irish subjects, the rebellion then being at its height.

== Family ==
Hector Munro, 17th Baron of Foulis married firstly the Hon. Anne, or Agnes Fraser who was the daughter of Hugh Fraser, 5th Lord Lovat, chief of Clan Fraser of Lovat. They had the following children:

1. Robert Munro, 18th Baron of Foulis (known as the Black Baron).
2. Sir Hector Munro, 1st Baronet of Foulis (who succeeded his older brother).
3. Margaret Munro (who married Alexander Mackenzie, 4th of Davochmaluag).

Hector Munro married secondly a distant relation, Janet Munro, daughter of Andrew Munro, 5th of Milntown, but without issue. Hector Munro died on 14 November 1603 and was buried with his father and elder brother at Kiltearn. He was succeeded by his eldest son.

== See also ==
- Chiefs of Clan Munro
- Clan Munro
