= Lachlan Mor Mackintosh, 16th of Mackintosh =

Scottish clan chief (died 1606)

Lachlan Mor Mackintosh, 16th of Mackintosh (died 1606) was the chief of the Clan Mackintosh, a Scottish clan of the Scottish Highlands. He was also chief of the confederation of clans that was known as the Clan Chattan.

== Early life ==
Lachlan Mor Mackintosh, 16th of Mackintosh was the second son of William Mackintosh, 15th chief and his wife Margaret Ogilvie. His elder brother William had died young and so Lachlan succeeded as chief. As Lachlan was only a child of seven years old when he succeeded, Donald Mackintosh, 3rd of Killachie was chosen as his tutor. Lachlan's family were apprehensive of trouble from George Gordon, 4th Earl of Huntly and so sent Lachlan to Strathnaver to be cared for by Mackay of Strathnaver, chief of the Clan Mackay. However, while he was travelling north he was intercepted by Mackenzie of Kintail, chief of the Clan Mackenzie and taken to Eilean Donan where he was kept until he was old enough to marry Agnes, the daughter of Mackenzie of Kintail. In 1558, Lachlan was sent to Edinburgh to be educated and from 1560 to 1562 was also attached to the court.

== Chief of Clan Mackintosh and Clan Chattan ==
In 1562, aged 19, Lachlan returned home and set about taking revenge for his father who had been murdered. The same year, according to the Mackintosh of Kinrara manuscript of the 17th century, Lachlan at the head of the Clan Chattan was among the Highlanders, along with the Clan Fraser of Lovat and Clan Munro, who came to the assistance of Mary, Queen of Scots during the Siege of Inverness where Inverness Castle was taken for the Queen. Lachlan and his clan subsequently supported the Queen in her victory over the Earl of Huntly at the Battle of Corrichie, where Huntly was killed. According to 19th-century historian Alexander Mackintosh-Shaw, it is likely that Lachlan also fought at the Battle of Langside in 1568 as five days before the battle he had subscribed to a band for the Queen's defence at the town of Hamilton, South Lanarkshire. Of the 136 subscribing barons and chiefs, apart from Mackintosh only two others were Highland chiefs: George Gordon, 5th Earl of Huntly who was the son of the slain 4th Earl, and Alexander Gordon, 12th Earl of Sutherland.

On 27 June 1568, Lachlan obtained from the Earl of Huntly, as superior, the heritable right of Benchar, Clune, Kincraig, Schiphin, Essich, Bochrubin, Dundelchat and Tordarroch. Some of these included the "castle and lands" of Inverness, as well as a fresh grant for Dunachton. He and the Earl of Huntly also exchanged a band of friendship. Lachlan is mentioned in a charter under the Great Seal of Scotland to his son, Angus.

The Regent Moray was assassinated in 1570 and as a result an "obligation" he had arranged to end the feud that had existed since 1431 between the Mackintoshes and the Clan MacDonald of Keppoch over the disputed lands of the Braes of Lochaber was not completed, and the feud therefore continued for more than a century.

In 1573, the Earl of Sutherland was petitioning to have himself served as heir to the Earldom at Aberdeen and not at Inverness because no jury was able to sit at the latter due to Colin Cam Mackenzie, 11th of Kintail, Hugh Fraser, 5th Lord Lovat, Robert Mor Munro, 15th Baron of Foulis and Lachlan Mor Mackintosh, 16th of Mackintosh all being at deadly feud with each other. The feud was over a dispute between the Mackenzies and Munros to hold Chanonry Castle in Fortrose. The Frasers supported the Munros and the Mackintoshes supported the Mackenzies. The feud was ended after much blood-shed, when arbiters, one of whom was Mackintosh, decided that it belonged to Mackenzie. The Frasers of Lovat had long been dominant in the area that is known as The Aird, so much so that possessions in it by other families were almost unknown or forgotten about. The grandfather of Lachlan Mor Mackintosh, 16th chief was Lachlan Mackintosh, 14th chief who by 1520 had acquired a considerable estate in The Aird. Lachlan Mor Mackintosh, 16th chief had also done much to enlarge and consolidate his family's estates. 19th century writer John Anderson's History of the Frasers of Lovat states that the family of Mackintosh held large possessions in The Aird which Lord Lovat was very anxious to get his own hands on, and this was shortly after the time of Lachlan Mor Mackintosh, 16th chief.

A subsequent feud took place between Lachalan Mackintosh and the chief of the Clan Campbell of Cawdor over the lands of Ardersier where the Mackintoshes were tenants of Campbell. The lands originally belonged to the Bishop of Ross who had granted them to Robert Lesley who in turn had let them to various tenants. Lachlan wished to purchase the lands of Ardersier because they were close to his lands of Petty but Campbell wanted to keep them for himself. Lachlan carried out raids on Campbell's tenants to put pressure on him to sell the lands but Campbell would not let go and in the end Lachlan had to yield. A bond was signed on 17 June 1581 in which Lachlan renounced his claims to the lands of Ardersier.

Between 1587 and 1591 the Earl of Sutherland and George Sinclair, 4th Earl of Caithness were at feud with each other and Lachlan Mackintosh supported Sutherland, who was also supported by the Mackenzies, Munros and MacLeods of Assynt. Lachlan Mackintosh was employed to induce Huistean Du Mackay, 13th of Strathnaver onto to Sutherland's side and was successful in this task.

On 4 February 1589 the Privy Council of Scotland issued letters of "fire and sword" to Lachlan Mackintosh and many other Highlands chiefs, including the Earl of Huntly, Earl of Atholl, Earl of Argyll and others of the Campbells, against the Clan Gregor for the murder of the King's forester.

On 3 October 1594 the Mackintoshes supported Archibald Campbell, 7th Earl of Argyll at the Battle of Glenlivet where they were defeated by the forces of George Gordon, 6th Earl of Huntly who was leading a Catholic rebellion. However, the Catholic lords were soon after subdued by the King and Huntly fled to Continental Europe. He returned in 1597 and was pardoned and in July that year reconciled with Lachlan Mackintosh.

In 1599, the feud with the Campbells of Cawdor was reignited in which the son of Malcolm Mackintosh who was in turn Lachlan's third son entered Campbell of Cawdor's lands with a body of thirty "brokin hielandmen all bodin with arrows, swords, and haberschonis", oppressing Campbell's tenants and violently cutting down three score of young growing trees and carrying them away. As a result, Lachlan as the chief, along with Sir R. Innes and Hector Munro, 17th Baron of Foulis, who in May 1595 had become cautioners for the peaceable behavior of Lachlan and his clan, incurred a fine of 10,000 merks. However, following this, in the same year, the Mackintoshes carried out another attack on the Campbells of Cawdor, this time with blood-shed and on 7 December many of them were denounced as rebels by royal letters.

Lachlan Mor Mackintosh died in October 1606.

== Family ==
Arms of the Chief of Clan Mackintosh

Lachlan Mor Mackintosh, 16th of Mackintosh had married Agnes, daughter of Kenneth Mackenzie, 10th of Kintail and had the following children:

1. Angus Mackintosh, who married Lady Jean Campbell, daughter of Archibald Campbell, Earl of Argyll. He died in Padua, Italy in November, 1593 leaving one son, Lachlan, who succeeded his grandfather as chief and one daughter who married Ross of Balnagowan.
2. William Mackintosh, 1st of the Mackintosh of Borlum cadet branch, and who married Beatrix, daughter of Innes of Invermarkie. He was tutor during his nephew's minority.
3. Malcolm Mackintosh, who married firstly, Janet, daughter of Glengarry and secondly, Christian, daughter of John Munro of Fearn.
4. John Mackintosh, who married Christian Mackay, sister of Donald Mackay, 1st Lord Reay and granddaughter of George Sinclair, 4th Earl of Caithness.
5. Duncan Macknitosh, who married firstly, Beatrix, daughter of Angus Mackintosh of Termitt, with whom he had one son, and secondly, a daughter of Dunbar of Grangehill, with whom he had six sons. He was the founder of the Mackintosh of Aberarder cadet branch.
6. Alan Mackintosh, who married firstly, Elizabeth, daughter of David Rose of Holm, with whom he had two sons, and secondly, Lilias, daughter of Patrick Falconer of Newtown, by whom he had one daughter and one son, thirdly, he married Euphemia, daughter of Campbell of Cawdor.
7. Lachlan Mackintosh, who married Jean, daughter of Macpherson of Grange and Cluny, by whom he had two sons. He was the founder of the Mackintosh of Corribrough cadet branch.
8. Janet Mackintosh, who married William MacLeod of MacLeod.
9. Katherine Mackintosh, who married MacDonald of Glengarry.
10. Margaret Mackintosh, who married the younger of Glengarry.
11. Marjory Mackintosh, who married Robert Munro, 18th Baron of Foulis, as his third wife.
12. Isabel Mackintosh, who married Sir Robert Campbell of Glenfalloch, 3rd Baronet of Glenorchy.

== See also ==
- Chiefs of Clan Mackintosh
