= Sir Hector Munro, 2nd Baronet =

Scottish noble and clan chief

Sir Hector Munro, 2nd Baronet of Foulis (born August 1635) was a Scottish noble and clan chief of the highland Clan Munro. He is also by tradition the 20th Baron and 23rd overall chief of the clan. However, he is actually the 13th chief of the Clan Munro who can be proved by contemporary evidence.

Hector Munro, 2nd Baronet was the son of the son of Sir Hector Munro, 1st Baronet and Mary Mackay, daughter of Hugh Mackay of Farr, Sutherland, chief of the Clan Mackay. Hector's father the 1st Baronet had died in 1635, the year Hector the 2nd Baronet was born and his more powerful cousins, the Munros of Obsdale and Munros of Lemlair were in majority. According to R.W. Munro who was the Clan Munro Association's historian, Hector Munro, 2nd Baronet died in 1651 aged just 14 and during his minority Robert Monro of the Obsdale branch and John Munro of Lemlair had been his tutors. Robert Monro who had held an important command in Ireland was imprisoned in the Tower of London by Oliver Cromwell and so John Munro of Lemlair had the military command of the clan whom he led in support of the royalist rising at Inverness in 1649 before defecting to the side of the covenanters and leading the clan at the Battle of Carbisdale in 1650, the year before Hector's death.

According to historian Alexander Mackenzie, Hector Munro, 2nd Baronet is said to have died aged just 17 in 1651. However, different sources give different details of the circumstances surrounding his death.

The Munro MS history written by George Martine between 1673 and 1697 states that Hector died at his uncle Donald Mackay, 1st Lord Reay's house in 1651, in Durness, Sutherland. (Note: A birth record of 1778 in the Durness parish registers for one Katharine Munro records her father, Angus Munro, by the Gaelic alias of "Macalister macDholicachin", which translates as "son of Alexander, son of Donald, son of Hector") However, Fraser's Wardlaw MS disagrees on the year of death and hints at "suspicion of mal[e]fice". While Burke's Peerage and Baronetage has always stated that he died on his travels in Holland.

Whatever the fate of Sir Hector Munro, 2nd Baronet, he was succeeded in the chiefship of the Clan Munro in Ross-shire by his 2nd cousin Robert Munro of Obsdale who then became Sir Robert Munro, 3rd Baronet.

Baronetage of Nova Scotia
Preceded by Hector Munro	Baronet (of Foulis); 1635–c.1651	Succeeded by Robert Munro
