= Donald Munro of Foulis =

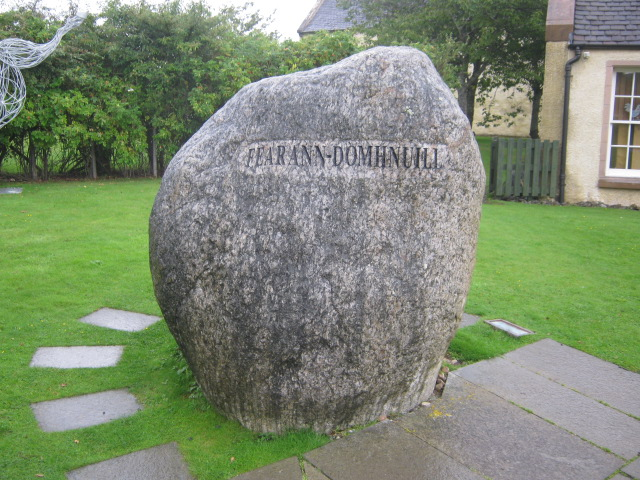
Stone outside the Store House of Foulis which includes a Clan Munro exhibition, reading in Scottish Gaelic: Fearann-Domhnuill meaning Ferindonald or Donald's land in accordance with the tradition of Donald Munro.

Donald Munro (died 1039) is the first traditional chief of the Clan Munro.

There is no existing contemporary evidence for Donald's existence however he is documented in several later family manuscripts such as the Coul MS and Munro Tree 1734.

According to early 18th-century historian Alexander Nisbet, with no quoted source; The first of the name of the (Munro) family, was Donald, son of O'Caan Ro's, a nobleman upon the Water of Ro in Ireland, who came to Scotland with some forces to the assistance of Malcolm II against the Danes; the King for his good-service gave him the lands of East-Dingwall, which he called "Ferin-Donald". i.e. "Donald's Lands": And he was called Donald a Bunro in respect of his father's residence on the Water of Ro in Ireland; and thereafter, by the change of the letter "B" to "M", his descendants were called Munros. They got also other lands in Scotland, which they called Foules, from a place in Ireland, of that name, called "Loch-Feul". Donald's father, O'Caan is said to have been the Prince of Fermanagh.

The lands spanning the parishes of Kiltearn and Alness, north of Dingwall, are known as Ferindonald, from the Gaelic Fearan Domhnull ("Donald's land"). Although tradition identifies this "Donald" with Donald Munro, there is no evidence of the clan in the vicinity prior to the 14th century. It is equally possible that the "Donald" of Fearan Domhnull was someone else: possibly either Malcolm III's like-named brother, or more probably Malcolm III's like-named son, either of whom may have been the first Mormaer of Ross. It was during Malcolm III's reign that eastern Ross likely first came under the control of the Kings of Scotland.

Arguments against Donald Munro's existence include the fact that surnames were not used during the early 11th century in Scotland.

== See also ==
- Chiefs of Clan Munro
