= Newmore Castle =

Castle in the United Kingdom

Coordinates: 57°43′11″N 4°13′7″W

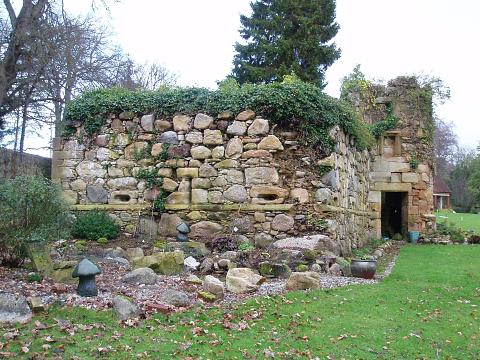
Newmore Castle in 2008

Newmore Castle is situated just north of the town of Alness in Ross and Cromarty, Highland, Scotland.

== Architecture ==
The castle is now a ruin. It was once a three-storey building; however, it has now been reduced to a single-storey building with a barrel-vaulted roof remaining. There is also the lower remains of a stair turret which once led to the upper floors, giving access to what was formerly a first-floor hall. The ground floor entrance, protected by gun ports, also still remains.

== History ==
In the early 16th century, the Newmore Estate was held by Andrew Munro, 3rd of Milntown who was known as Black Andrew of the Seven Castles because he had a castle on each of his seven estates. In the later 16th century, Andrew Munro, 5th of Milntown was known as Andrew Munro of Newmore during his father's lifetime having received Newmore from him. The castle is mentioned in records from as early as 1560 and it also gave safe keeping to the 'evidents and writs' of Foulis.

The most famous owner of the castle was George Munro, 1st of Newmore of the 17th century, brother to Sir Robert Munro, 3rd Baronet of Foulis the chief of the Clan Munro. George Munro commanded the forces of King Charles II after the restoration of the Stuart monarchy in Great Britain. When public duties allowed, George Munro received visitors at the castle with a 'coarse but cordial' soldier's entertainment.

Newmore Castle remained with this line of the Munro family for several generations before passing to the Munro of Culrain line in 1763. It fell into disrepair during the 19th century.

== See also ==
- John Munro, 4th of Newmore
