= George Munro, 1st of Newmore =

Scottish soldier and politician (1602–1693)

Major-General George Munro, 1st of Newmore
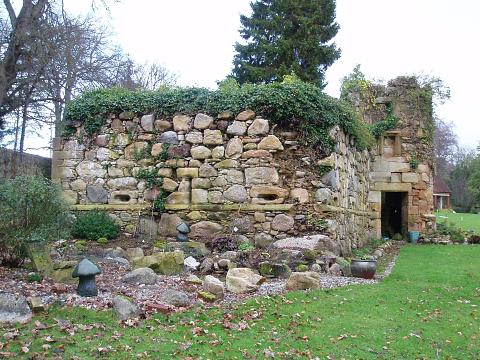
- Newmore Castle, Ross and Cromarty, Scotland, 2008
- Born: 1602
- Died: 1693 (aged 90–91); Newmore Castle
- Relatives: Robert Mor Munro, 15th Baron of Foulis (great-grandfather); Robert Monro (uncle); Sir Robert Munro, 3rd Baronet (older brother)
- Military career
- Allegiance: Sweden; Covenanters; Engagers; Royalist
- Rank: Major-General
- Conflicts: Thirty Years' War; Battle of Lützen; Battle of Nördlingen (1634); Irish Confederate Wars; Rebellion of Ulster; Capture of Belfast; Siege of Derry; Siege of Coleraine; Scottish Civil War; Battle of Stirling (1648)
- Other work: Member of Parliament

Sir George Munro, 1st of Newmore (1602–1693) was a 17th-century Scottish soldier and shire commissioner of Parliament from the Clan Munro, Ross-shire, Scotland. He was seated at Newmore Castle. Between 1629 and 1634 Munro held command in the Swedish army during the Thirty Years' War, and from 1642 in the Scottish Covenanter army during the Irish Confederate Wars before changing his allegiance to the Royalist cause of Charles I in 1648 during the Scottish Civil War and Irish Confederate Wars.

== Lineage ==
George Munro, 1st of Newmore was the third son of Colonel John Munro, 2nd of Obsdale, who was, in turn, a son of George Munro, 1st of Obsdale, who in turn was a younger son of Robert Mor Munro, 15th Baron of Foulis, chief of the Clan Munro. George's elder brother was Sir Robert Munro, 3rd Baronet of Foulis, who became chief of the Clan Munro in 1651. As a cadet of the Munro of Obsdale family, George is also sometimes referred to as George Munro of Obsdale and as he later owned the lands of Culrain is also sometimes referred to as George Munro of Culrain.

== Thirty Years' War ==
Munro grew up a bold, powerful and fearless man, playing a conspicuous part in the history and feuds of his time. He entered the army and accompanied his famous uncle, General Robert Monro (and his great-uncle, chief Robert Munro, 18th Baron of Foulis) to the Continental Thirty Years' War, in which he very rapidly distinguished himself. In 1629 when the war broke out between Sweden and Austria, George Munro gave his services to Gustavus Adolphus and served under him with distinction. George Munro commanded the left wing of the Swedish army at the Battle of Lutzen on 6 November 1632 in which the Swedish army was victorious over the Imperialists. However, after Lutzen, arguing ensued amongst many of the officers of the Swedish army and as a result, they were defeated at the Battle of Nördlingen. The petty differences on the part of those in command led to no properly defined plan of attack and George Munro was so disgusted with these matters that he returned home to Scotland.

== Irish Confederate Wars ==
Munro fought in the Irish Confederate Wars under his uncle Robert Monro who commanded the Scottish Covenanter army. Between 1642 and 1646 George and his uncle Robert were generally successful against their enemies the O'Neils, and during that time the Munros put down a rebellion in Ulster in 1642 and captured Belfast in 1644. In 1644 Robert Monro was recalled to Scotland to oppose the Royalist victories of James Graham, 1st Marquess of Montrose, and command of the Scottish Covenanter army in Ireland fell to his nephew George Munro, 1st of Newmore whose principles inclined him to favour the Royalists.

General Robert Monro was defeated by the Irish Confederates at the Battle of Benburb in Ireland in 1646 and Carrickfergus Castle was surrendered to the English Parliamentarian George Monck in 1648. As a result, Robert Monro was imprisoned by Oliver Cromwell in the Tower of London. George Munro then returned to Scotland in 1648, where he was appointed General by Charles I of England, thus becoming a royalist.

== Civil War in Scotland ==
George Munro, having returned to Scotland with 1200 horse and 2100 foot soldiers, was sent to support the royalist James Hamilton, 1st Duke of Hamilton. The Scottish royalists were defeated at the Battle of Preston (1648) by the Parliamentarian forces of Oliver Cromwell. But before the battle Munro had refused to serve under James Livingston, 1st Earl of Callendar who was the second in command under the Duke of Hamilton. An argument had ensued, and as a result, Munro's involvement in the battle was limited. George Munro had an intense dislike for Callender, and Callendar saw no reason why Munro should be allowed an independent command.

The Duke of Hamilton (Earl of Lanark) had raised three regiments of royalist horse, which were now under his command. These, with the accessions of forces which were daily arriving from different parts of the kingdom, were quite sufficient to have put down the insurrection in the west; but instead of marching, Lanark, to everyone's surprise, proceeded through East Lothian towards the eastern borders to meet up with Sir George Munro, who was retiring upon Berwick before the army of Cromwell. The Earl of Lanark declined to attack Covenanter David Leslie, Lord Newark, acting contrary to the advice of George Munro and his other officers. According to Dr Wishart, Lanark's advanced guard, on arriving at Musselburgh, attacked some of Leslie's Covenanter outposts who defended the bridge over the River Esk, and Lanark's advanced guard, though inferior in number, immediately put them in great disorder, and killed some of them without sustaining any loss. This success was reported to the Earl of Lanark, and it was represented to him that by following it up immediately, while the enemy continued in the state of alarm, he might perhaps obtain a bloodless victory, secure possession of the city of Edinburgh and the town of Leith. However, Edinburgh had already been taken by the Whig party in what was known as the Whiggamore Raid.

Ever since the Earl of Lanark's march to the borders to meet Munro, Archibald Campbell, 1st Marquess of Argyll had been busily employed in raising men in his own territory to assist the Covenanters. Shortly afterwards, Munro and his clansmen who acted as the Earl of Lanark's advance force defeated the forces of the Marquess of Argyll at the Battle of Stirling (1648). Munro had moved in on his own initiative and succeeded in entering Stirling before any of Argyll's commanders were aware of his presence. Munro even personally kicked down a postern door to chase out Argyll's men. Argyll lost about 200 men in the battle. After this victory, Munro urged Lanark to continue and attack David Leslie, but he was overruled and in the following weeks the Earl of Lanark made peace with the Marquess of Argyll and with Leslie.

== Knighthood ==
In 1649 Munro visited Charles II of England in Holland where he received the honour of knighthood with a new commission from the exiled King.

== Return to Ireland ==
In 1649 Munro returned briefly to Ireland where he opposed Cromwell's Irish campaign and supported the royalist siege of Derry. George Munro left the siege on 7 June 1649 and proceeded to Coleraine which he also laid siege to and successfully captured. He then left Coleraine on 17 July 1649 and rejoined the siege of Derry. The besiegers built a fort at the Knock of Ember which they named Fort Charles in recognition of the king. The fort was itself besieged by the Parliamentarians who were repulsed by George Munro and his forces. The siege of Derry however was not successful and Munro was forced into a final return to Scotland in April 1650 having fled to Enniskillen as a result of the rout of the Scottish royalist army at the Battle of Lisnagarvey.

== Royalist rising of 1651 to 1654 ==
After the defeat of the royalists in England, Oliver Cromwell came to occupy Scotland, but many of the Highlanders waged war against him. The royalist uprising, led by William Cunningham, 9th Earl of Glencairn in support of the exiled King Charles II, began in 1651. General John Middleton, 1st Earl of Middleton, a veteran of the wars against Cromwell, was appointed commander-in-chief of the royalist forces, and both he and Glencairn agreed to unite their respective forces at Dornoch in Sutherland. Munro served as an officer in General Middleton's force.

However, the two factions of the royalist force engaged in petty disputes and quarrels with each other. This eventually led to a duel between Munro and the Earl of Glencairn himself, with broadswords (known in Scotland as claymores), in which both were wounded. Soon afterwards Glencairn was placed under arrest by the orders of Middleton and his sword was taken from him. However, the following day two junior officers from the two camps had a duel of their own in which one was killed and the other was later arrested and hanged. The royalist rising of the Highlanders and Lowlanders, although having various successes in skirmishes against Cromwell, was not enough and ended by the autumn of 1654.

== Restoration ==
The Restoration of King Charles II took place in 1660 and Sir George Munro, 1st of Newmore commanded the King's forces between 1674 and 1677.

== Shire Commissioner of Parliament ==
In 1661 George Munro was elected shire commissioner of Parliament for Ross-shire and continued to represent that constituency until 1663. He represented the county of Sutherland from 1669 until 1674 and was again returned for Ross-shire in 1685 and represented it until 1686. He was elected for the same county in 1689 and continued to represent it until his death in 1693. In 1691, at an advanced age, George Munro was briefly in command of an Independent Highland Company that was to keep order in the Scottish Highlands.

George died on 11 July 1693 at his seat Newmore Castle and was succeeded by his eldest son, Hugh Munro, 2nd of Newmore.

== Family ==
George married firstly his cousin, Anne Munro daughter of his uncle Major-General Robert Monro and Jean, widow of Viscount Montgomery of Ardee, and had one child:

1. Hugh Munro, 2nd of Newmore.

George married secondly in 1649 Christiana Hamilton, daughter of Sir Frederick Hamilton of Manorhamilton and sister of Gustavus Hamilton, 1st Viscount Boyne, descended from Mary, eldest daughter of King James II of Scotland. George and Christiana had the following children:

1. John Munro. (died 1682).
2. George Munro, 1st of Culrain. (From whom the present chiefs of the Clan Munro are descended).
3. Ann Munro. (Married first Donald Mackay, Master of Reay - second son of John Mackay, 2nd Lord Reay. She married secondly Lauchlan Mackintosh, 19th of Mackintosh.)
4. Jane Munro. (Married Alexander Sinclair of Brins, in Caithness).
5. Isobel Munro (Married Robert Gray, 6th of Skibo).
6. Lucy Munro. (Married James Sinclair-Sutherland, 2nd of Swinnie.)
7. Helen Munro. (Married firstly Angus, eldest son of Angus Mackay of Bighouse. Married secondly, Captain Andrew Munro of Westertown, second son of Sir John Munro, 4th Baronet).
8. Catherine Munro. (Married George Munro of Lemlair).
9. Florence Munro. (Married Andrew Munro of Logie).

== See also ==
- Clan Munro
- John Munro, 4th of Newmore

== Bibliography ==
- Henderson, Thomas Finlayson (1894). "Monro, George" . In Lee, Sidney (ed.). Dictionary of National Biography. Vol. 38. London: Smith, Elder & Co.
- Keltie, John S F.S.A. Scot. (1830). History of the Scottish Highlands, Highland Clans and Scottish Regiments.
- Mackenzie, Alexander. (1898). History of the Munros of Foulis. Edinburgh.
- Monroe, Horace (Canon of Southwark). (1926). Foulis Castle and The Monroes of Lower Iveagh.
- Munro, R.W. (1987). Mapping the Clan Munro. Published by the Clan Munro (Association).
- Reid, Stuart. (1998). All the King's Armies: a military history of the English Civil War 1642-1651. Staplehurst.
- Simpson, Peter. (1996). The Independent Highland Companies, 1603 - 1760. ISBN 0-85976-432-X.
- Way, George and Squire, Romily. (1994). Collins Scottish Clan & Family Encyclopedia. (Foreword by The Rt Hon. The Earl of Elgin KT, Convenor, The Standing Council of Scottish Chiefs).
