= Contullich Castle =

Coordinates: 57°42′19″N 4°17′15″W

- Interactive map of the Contullich Castle area

General information
- Location: Ross-shire, Alness, Scotland
- Completed: 11th century
- Demolished: late 18th century

Contullich Castle was a castle located a few miles north-west of the town of Alness, on the eastern side of the county of Ross-shire, Scotland.

The castle is believed to date back until at least the 11th century. In 1379, Euphemia I, Countess of Ross confirmed the lands of Contullich and the fort to her cousin Hugh Munro, 9th Baron of Foulis.

During the early 16th century Andrew Munro, 3rd of Milntown was granted many charters for lands including Contullich and Kildermorie in the parish of Alness. He was known as Black Andrew of the Seven Castles because he had a castle on each of his estates including Contullich and Milntown Castle.

During the later half of the 16th century the lands of Contullich passed to "Hector Munro, 1st of Contullich and Fyrish" who was a younger son of Robert Munro, 14th Baron of Foulis and a younger brother of Robert Mor Munro, 15th Baron of Foulis.

During the 17th century the castle was seat to General Robert Monro of the Munro of Obsdale family, who fought in the Thirty Years' War, Bishop's Wars and the Irish Confederate Wars. In 1620, Robert Monro built "a good house" at Contullich. The small castle was replaced with a farmhouse at the end of the 18th century.
