= Munro of Milntown =

Family cadet branch of the Highland Clan Munro

The Munros of Milntown were a family cadet branch of the Highland Clan Munro. As the earliest recorded cadet branch of the Munro chiefs, the Munros of Milntown were the 'senior' cadet branch of the clan, and spawned many cadet branches. They were frequently recorded as 'Monro' as well as Munro. The Munros of Milntown are notable for being involved in events concerning the history of the late Middle Ages in the Scottish Highlands.

== John Munro, I of Milntown ==
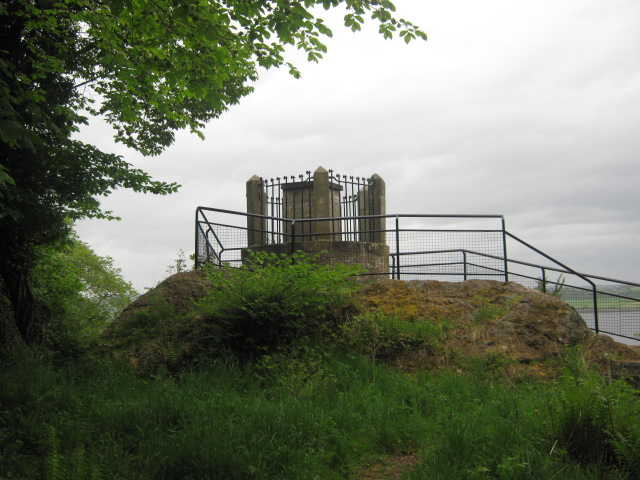
The monument that marks the Battle of Clachnaharry where John Munro, 1st of Milntown led the Munros against the Mackintoshes.

The Munros of Milntown descend from chief Hugh Munro, 9th Baron of Foulis (d. 1425) who supported the Lord of the Isles at the Battle of Harlaw in 1411. A younger son of his was John Munro, the first of the Milntown line, whose elder brother George Munro of Foulis was killed during the Battle of Bealach nam Broig in 1452. Thus the chiefship was left to George's then baby son also called John Munro (d. 1490). While John Munro of Foulis was still an infant his uncle John Munro of Milntown became "Tutor of Foulis".

In 1454, John Munro of Milntown led the Clan Munro on a raid into Perthshire. On their return home they were ambushed by the Clan Mackintosh at Clachnaharry, where the Battle of Clachnaharry ensued and many lives were lost on both sides. It is said that John Munro of Milntown lost a hand and the Chief of Clan Mackintosh was killed. According to Fraser's Wardlaw Manuscript after the battle of Clachnaharry, John Munro who was wounded was cared for by the Frasers of Lovat, and that laid the foundation of kindness between the Frasers and Munros to this very day. John Munro, 1st of Milntown had two children;

1. Andrew Mor Munro, 2nd of Milntown
2. John Munro, 1st of Kilmorak.

== Andrew Mor Munro, II of Milntown ==
=== Milntown Castle ===
John Munro, 1st of Milntown was succeeded by his eldest son, Andrew Mor Munro, 2nd of Milntown; "a bold, austere, and gallant gentleman, esteemed by his friends, and a terror to his enemies". Andrew is said to have built Milntown Castle in 1500. The family's base, Milntown Castle was at Miltown of Meddat which was so near to Balnagown Castle that the chiefs of Clan Ross tried to stop them building it there. Sir Andrew Munro at this time was also governor of the royal Dingwall Castle. Andrew Mor Munro, 2nd of Milntown was succeeded by his eldest son, Andrew Beg Munro, 3rd of Milntown also known as Black Andrew.

== Andrew Munro, III of Milntown ==
Perhaps the most famous of the Milntown line was Andrew Munro, 3rd of Milntown who became known as Black Andrew of the seven castles. In 1512, he received a crown charter for his lands with the office of chief mair or steward of the Earldom of Ross. Also, in 1512, King James IV of Scotland granted him the "croft of called the markland of Tulloch" for the annual payment of one pound of wax, payable at midsummer within the Chapel of Delny. In addition to the lands of Milntown, Andrew acquired by grants and purchases extensive possessions in the county of Ross, such as Delny and Newmore in the parish of Rosskeen, Contullich and Kildermorie in the parish of Alness, Dochcarty in the parish of Dingwall, Allan in the parish of Fearn and Culnauld in the parish of Nigg. He was known amongst the local residents as Black Andrew of the seven castles because he had a castle on each of his seven estates, including Milntown Castle, Contullich Castle, Delny Castle, and a tower house at Docharty. Andrew Munro, 3rd of Milntown had three sons;

1. George Munro, 4th of Milntown.
2. William Munro, 1st of Allan.
3. Andrew Munro, 1st of Culnauld.

Black Andrew died in 1522 and was succeeded by his eldest son George Munro, 4th of Milntown.

== George Munro, IV of Milntown ==
In 1561, George Munro, 4th of Milntown was appointed by the Queen as Ballie and Chamberlain of her lands and lordships of Ross and Ardmenach, the appointment to continue during her pleasure. Between 1561 and 1566 George Munro, 4th of Milntown was feur of Tarlogie and in 1565 he held Inverness Castle for the King and Queen. George Munro, 4th of Milntown had added Newmore in the parish of Rosskeen and Easter Aird in Tarbat. He also used Docharty near Dingwall, which he had inherited from his father as a territorial base, and was then known as George Munro of "Docharty". In 1561, George Munro was made governor of the royal Dingwall Castle. Three of his younger brothers received the lands of Meikle Allan and Culnald. George Munro of Milntown was Mary, Queen of Scots' bailie and chamberlain for the royal lands of Ross and the Black Isle. George Munro, 4th of Milntown had four sons;

1. Andrew Munro, 5th of Milntown.
2. Donald Munro, 1st of Tarlogie.
3. George Munro, 1st of Pitlunde, the Chancellor of Ross, from who descend the Munro cadet branches; Bearcrofts, Auchinbowie, Craig Lockhart, Cockburn, Argaty, Edmondsham and Ingsdon. Perhaps the most notable descendants being the Munro of Auchinbowie family.
4. John Munro, 1st of Pitonachy from who also descend the Munro cadet branches of Rosehaugh, Novar, Findon, Poyntzfield and several others. A notable descendant being General Hector Munro, 8th of Novar.

George died in 1576 and was succeeded by his eldest son, Andrew Munro, 5th of Milntown.

== Andrew Munro, V of Milntown ==
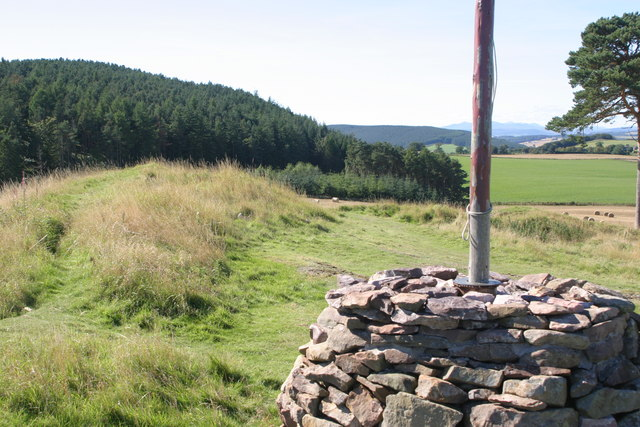
Ormond Hill where Ormond Castle once stood which was acquired by Andrew Munro, 5th of Milntown.

In 1562, Alistair (Alexander) Gunn chief of Clan Gunn insulted the Earl of Moray. The Earl, by the means of Andrew Munro, V of Milntown entrapped the Gunns at a place called Delvines near Nairn. The Gunn Chief was captured and taken to Inverness where the Earl of Moray had him executed "under pretence of justice". Historian Sir Robert Gordon (1580–1650) wrote of the capture of Alexander Gunn, stating that Andrew Munro of Milntown had laid an ambush for him. In 1568, Ormond Castle and the lands of Suddie in Avoch were acquired by Andrew Munro, 5th of Milntown, also known as Andrew Munro of Newmore during his father's lifetime.

=== Chanonry Castle ===
With the Mackenzies the Munros were often at feud. Between 1569 and 1573 Andrew Munro, 5th of Milntown defended and held, for three years, Chanonry Castle in the town of Fortrose on the Black Isle, which he had received from the Regent Moray who died in 1569, against the Clan Mackenzie, at the expense of many lives on both sides. The feud was settled when the castle was handed over to the Mackenzies peacefully under an act of pacification (a treaty of peace to cease hostilities). In Alexander Mackenzie's books The History of the Mackenzies published in 1894 and the History of the Munros of Fowlis published in 1898, he claims that an attempted sortie by the Munros for fish at a nearby loch was foiled and as a result the Mackenzies took control of the castle by force. Although it is recorded by Sir Robert Gordon (1580 - 1656) to have been handed over by an act of pacification:

Sir Robert Gordon (1580–1656) wrote of the feud in his book A Genealogical History of the Earldom of Sutherland:

The Munros defended and kept the Castle for the space of thrie yeirs, with great slaughter on either syd, vntill it was delyvered to the Clanchenzie, by the Act of Pacification. And this wes the ground beginning of the feud and hartburning, which to this day, remaynes between the Clanchenzie and Munrois.

Andrew Munro 5th of Milntown had three sons:

1. George Munro, 6th of Milntown.
2. Andrew Munro, 1st of Kincraig.
3. John Munro, 1st of Fearn.

Munro also had five daughters, the youngest, Catherine, married a distant relative, George Munro, 1st of Obsdale. Andrew Munro, 5th of Milntown died in 1590 and was succeeded by his eldest son, George Munro, 6th of Milntown.

== George Munro, VI of Milntown ==
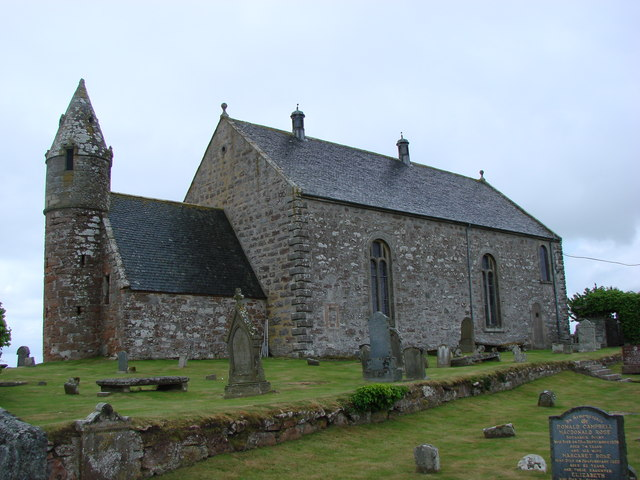
Kilmuir Easter Church, the tower and belfry were built by George Munro, 6th of Milntown and includes the armorial crest of the Munros and his initials: "G.M".

The Munro of Milntown family came to rival their chiefs the Munros of Foulis in power and influence. In 1621, George Munro, 6th of Milntown became MP for Inverness-shire, which then included Ross, Sutherland and Caithness. George also added Meikle, Tarrel and Ballone to his lands, and sat in the Scots Parliament between 1617 and 1621. George also built the tower and belfry of the Church of Kilmuir-Easter, on top of which is an eagle, the armorial crest of the Munros and a monogram; G.M, his initials. George Munro 6th of Milntown had three sons from his first marriage and later two sons from a second marriage:

1. George Munro 7th of Milntown, succeeded his father in 1623.
2. John Munro, fought in the Thirty Years' War under the clan chief, Robert Munro, 18th Baron of Foulis, and did not return.
3. William Munro, fought in the Thirty Years' War under the clan chief and did not return.
4. David Munro, fought in the Thirty Years' War under the clan chief and did not return.
5. Hector Munro, of whom there is no account.
6. John Munro, of whom there is no account.

== George Munro, VII of Milntown ==
George Munro, 7th of Milntown upon receiving his father's lands of Milntown also received the mills and office of chir mair of the Earldom of Ross which included 8 Chalders, 4 bolls of "Victual", a Croft named Markland of Tullich, at the extent of one pound of wax and the lands and town of Meikle Meddat at the extent of 6 chalders of bear and oatmeal, other dues, its ale house in the Barony of Delnie, Earldom of Ross and Sherrifdom of Inverness. George Munro, 7th of Milntown had two sons: Andrew Munro, 8th of Milntown and also Hugh Munro who married an unknown.

== Andrew Munro, VIII of Milntown ==
Andrew Munro, 8th of Milntown was the last of the family to possess the Milntown estate. However, as Andrew was only eleven years old when his father died, his maternal uncle took possession of the property and never actually allowed Andrew to possess the property. Andrew Munro served as a Captain under his kinsmen, George Munro, 1st of Newmore during the Irish Confederate Wars. While he was away Milntown Castle was burned down by carelessness in 1642. In 1644, Andrew Munro, 8th of Milntown returned to Scotland and took a distinguished part in the Battle of Kilsyth, where he was killed fighting at the head of his company. Andrew Munro was the last in the senior line of the Munros of Milntown. The office of Milntown Castle was sold in 1656 by Andrew's maternal uncle Sir John Innes to George Mackenzie of Tarbat who later became George Mackenzie, 1st Earl of Cromartie.

== See also ==
- Clan Munro
- Munro (disambiguation)
