= Robert Munro, 18th Baron of Foulis =

Scottish soldier

Munro of Foulis coat of Arms

Colonel Robert Munro of Foulis (died April 1633), also known as the Black Baron, is traditionally thought to have been the 18th Baron of Foulis in Scotland. He was a soldier of fortune, who served in the Holy Roman Empire under the banners of Gustavus Adolphus, king of Sweden. It is not certain how he got his epithet of the 'Black Baron'; it may have been from the colour of his hair rather than any perceived ferocity. Although this Robert Munro is traditionally 18th Baron and 21st overall chief of the Clan Munro, he is only the 11th Munro chief that can be proved by contemporary evidence.

== Other Munros ==
Robert Munro, 18th Baron of Foulis is often confused with his more famous cousin Robert Monro of the Munro of Obsdale branch of the same clan, who died sometime around 1675/1680, and also served in the Swedish army in this period, writing a famous history on his exploits. During the Thirty Years' War of 1618–1648 there were as many as 27 field officers and 11 captains with the name of 'Munro' in the Swedish army.

== Youth in Scotland ==
While still very young, in 1603, Robert became the 18th Baron of Foulis, after the death of his father Hector Munro, 17th Baron of Foulis. Being a minor, he was by dispensation and special warrant from James VI of Scotland, dated 8 January 1608, served heir male and provision to his father, all of the lands of Easter Fowlis.

He married Margaret Sutherland, daughter of William Sutherland, 9th of Duffus on 24 November 1610.

At a meeting of the Privy Council held on 27 March 1612, a commission was granted to Robert Munro of Foulis, along with others, including Alexander Gordon, brother of John Gordon, 13th Earl of Sutherland, John Munro of Lemlair, George Munro of Tarlogie and Andrew Munro of Novar for the apprehension of two men charged with stealing from George Munro of Tarrell, and bringing the alleged thieves before the Council to be delivered to the Justice for trial.

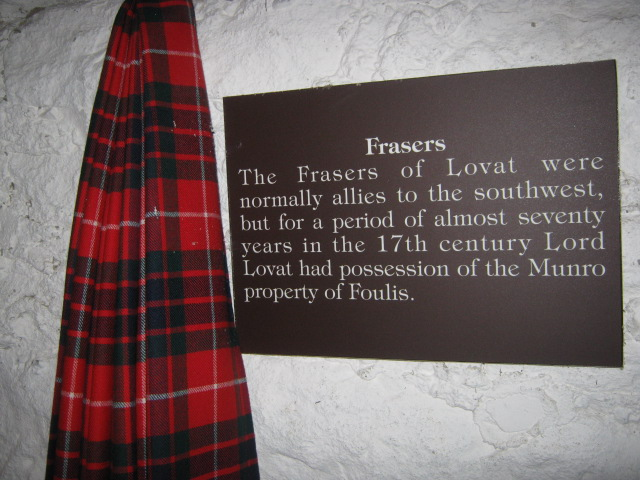
Clan Fraser of Lovat tartan in the Clan Munro exhibition at the Storehouse of Foulis, Scotland

Robert had another commission, along with the Earl of Sutherland and others, on 15 March 1614 to apprehend three men who had failed to appear before the Justice on the day appointed to answer the charge, at the instance of William Sutherland of Duffus, of having murdered a certain Donald Angus Gairson. The murderers were captured and put on trial.

During Robert's chieftaincy of his clan, a feud arose between John Gordon, 13th Earl of Sutherland (chief of Clan Sutherland) and George Sinclair, 5th Earl of Caithness (chief of Clan Sinclair), caused by Sinclair hunting on Sutherland's lands. Robert, being connected to the Sutherlands by marriage, sent a number of men from his clan to support the Earl of Sutherland. The Clan Mackay and the MacLeods of Assynt also assisted the Sutherlands. The Earl of Caithness gathered his forces and proceeded into Sutherland; however, having heard of the large army that faced him, he sent messengers to Sutherland with proposals of a peaceful settlement. His proposals of peace were refused and he was assured of battle the next morning. The Earl of Sutherland's army lined up, consisting of the Mackays on the left wing, the Sutherlands in the centre and the Munros and MacLeods on the right wing. As they advanced, Caithness's men fled, and the Munros went home not having engaged in battle, it is said to their disappointment.

Robert is said to have had costly habits, and by 1618 he was so impoverished that he had to dispone his estate to his relative Simon Fraser, 6th Lord Lovat, chief of Clan Fraser of Lovat, who remained in possession of the Barony of Foulis for some years.

== Soldier of Fortune ==
In June 1626 Robert joined the Scottish regiment of Donald Mackay, 1st Lord Reay (1591–1649), which was then being recruited for Danish service, largely in the Scottish Highlands. The actions of this unit are well documented in the famous 1637 History of Mackay's Regiment written by his cousin Robert Monro of Obsdale.

== In Swedish service ==
=== Siege of Stralsund ===
Munro of Foulis progressed quickly through the ranks, advancing to captain, then major and finally lieutenant colonel in Mackay's Scottish Regiment. In 1628 the Danes sent several Scottish regiments including those of Lord Spynie and of Donald Mackay (which included Munro's company) to fight in the Battle of Stralsund. Under Danish leadership the regiment was treated disgracefully, being forced often to sleep in the streets. When Alexander Leslie arrived from Pomerania with more Scottish, Swedish and German volunteers in July, he was also awarded governorship of the city. He was keen to show his admiration for his countrymen and amalgamated those he had brought from Sweden into a single fighting force with the Scots already in the city. He used the mixed Highland and Lowland contingent in a spectacular assault on the enemy which finally broke the siege. Robert Monro recorded:

Sir Alexander Leslie being made governour, he resolved for the credit of his countrymen to make an out-fall upon the Enemy, and desirous to confer the credit on his own Nation alone, being his first Essay in that Citie.

A Munro officer proudly recorded that at the defense of Stralsund in 1628 one of his men by the name of Mac-Weattiche, "did prove as valiant as a sword, fearing nothing but discredit".

However, Danish intervention in the Thirty Years War was unsuccessful, the Danish king Christian IV made peace, and in 1629 Mackay's regiment including the Munro company was paid off, but then re-hired as a going concern by the Swedish king Gustavus Adolphus.

=== Bloc Castle ===
In July 1631, Robert Munro of Foulis, with his own regiment alone, stormed and took possession of the fortified castle of Bloc in Mecklenburg, while en route to join the Swedish army at Werben.

=== Battle of Breitenfeld ===
In 1631 the Scottish brigades in the Swedish main (Crown) army marched to Leipzig, while other Scots and English units served with James 3rd Marquis Hamilton in an auxiliary British Army guarding the rear of the army. The famous Battle of Breitenfield (also known as the Battle of Leipzig) took place, near Leipzig, in September of that year. Tilly was defeated by Gustavus Adolphus and the Munros, who by their last charge contributed most to the victory of the Swedish Army. Sir James Ramsay was in command of the Scottish vanguard. On 7 September "after we had in the early morning, as the larke begunne to peep commended ourselbes and the event of the day to God," the great battle commenced. Whilst the Imperial cavalry scattered the Saxons on the left wing, the Scottish stood firm, firing for the first time in platoons. Hepburn formed a square and, when the Austrians had approached near enough, caused his pikemen to advance victoriously. In the meantime Lord Reay's MacKay and Munro Highlanders were equally successful.

=== Battle of Lutzen ===
Towards the end of 1631, Robert Munro briefly returned home to his native land but did not stay long as he soon returned to the war in Europe. He subsequently took part in the Battle of Lützen (1632), where the Munros were again victorious. At the battle the vanguard was led by Robert Munro of Foulis.

Robert Munro's successful military career came to an end when during one of the many skirmishes of the Thirty Years' War he was wounded in the right foot by a musket ball while crossing the Upper Danube river with Swedish troops. He was carried to Ulm, Germany, where his wound was dressed, but soon fell into a low fever and died in March 1633, aged about forty-four years.

In Ulm, Sir Patrick Ruthven was Governor, and Robert Munro had lived in the house of a barber and surgeon called Michael Rietmuller. By permission of the magistrates Robert was buried in the Franciscan church or "Barfüsserkirche," where also his standard, armour and spurs were hung up. Magister Balthasar Kerner delivered his funeral sermon on 29 April 1633.

== Family and descendants ==
Robert Munro, 18th baron of Foulis married firstly, Margaret, daughter of William Sutherland, 9th of Duffus who was descended from Nicolas, second son of Kenneth, 4th Earl of Sutherland. With Margaret he had one child, a daughter also named Margaret, who married Kenneth Mackenzie, I of Scatwell. Munro married secondly, before 1624 in London, Mary Haynes, an English lady with whom he also had one child, a daughter named Elizabeth born in 1632. According to the University of St Andrews, Robert married thirdly Marjory Mackintosh, daughter of Lachlan Mor Mackintosh, 16th of Mackintosh who was also designated as "of Dunachton". This concurs with 19th-century historian Alexander Mackintosh-Shaw's account that Lachlan Mor Mackintosh's daughter, Marjory, married Munro of Foulis.

Robert Munro was succeeded by his brother, Sir Hector Munro, 1st Baronet of Foulis who was made a baronet by King Charles I. Hector continued to command his brother's old infantry regiment in Germany, but it was disbanded very soon after.

== See also ==
- Gustavus Adolphus
- Thirty Years' War
- Clan Munro
