= Robert Monro =

Scottish general (died 1680)

- Born: c. 1601; Rosshire, Scotland
- Died: 1680; County Down, Ireland
- Relatives: Robert Mor Munro, 15th Baron of Foulis (grandfather); George Munro, 1st of Newmore (nephew); Sir Robert Munro, 3rd Baronet (nephew); Robert Munro, 18th Baron of Foulis (cousin)
- Military career
- Allegiance: Scotland; Sweden; Covenanters
- Rank: General
- Conflicts: Thirty Year's War; Siege of Stralsund (1628); Siege of Schivelbein; Siege of Neubrandenburg; Battle of Frankfurt an der Oder; Battle of Breitenfeld (1631); Battle of Nördlingen (1634); Bishops' Wars; Siege of Spynie Palace; Siege of Drum Castle; Siege of Edinburgh Castle; Irish Confederate Wars; Siege of Newry; Siege of Belfast; Battle of Benburb; Siege of Carrickfergus

Robert Monro (died 1680) was a Scottish general from the Clan Munro of Ross-shire, Kingdom of Scotland. He held command in the Swedish army under Gustavus Adolphus during Thirty Years' War. He also fought for the Scottish Covenanters during the Bishop's Wars in Scotland and commanded the Scottish Covenanter army during the Irish Confederate Wars. He was the author of a diary recounting his military experiences with the swedes during the Thirty Years' War, published as Monro, His Expedition With the Worthy Scots Regiment Called Mac-Keys.

== Early life ==
Robert Monro was the second son of George Munro, 1st of Obsdale and grandson of Robert Mor Munro, 15th Baron of Foulis, chief of Clan Munro. As a cadet of the Munro of Obsdale family, Robert is sometimes referred to as Robert Monro of Obsdale. He was seated at Contullich Castle.

== Thirty Years' War ==
=== Early skirmishes ===
During the Thirty Years' War Robert Monro gained a lieutenancy in the regiment that was raised by Donald Mackay, 1st Lord Reay for services in the Bohemian army, along with his chief of a similar name, Robert Munro, 18th Baron of Foulis. On 10 October 1626 the regiment embarked from Cromarty and after a sail of five days arrived at Glückstadt on the River Elbe. On 10 July 1627, a division of the regiment was sent to join their comrades who were stationed at a fortification in Boitzenberg, near Hamburg, where Monro had his first brush with the enemy. The Scots after a desperate struggle gained a victory over an overwhelming force of their assailants although they themselves also had to retire, carrying with them their guns and ammunition.

Monro next comes into notice at a severe engagement at the Pass in Oldenburg where he was wounded, receiving a wound to his own account, a "favourable mark" to the inside of the knee, while his partisan was broken in his hand by a cannonball. Robert's elder brother John Munro, 2nd of Obsdale, distinguished himself highly on this occasion and escaped unhurt. The Danes were defeated and had to retire however as they did so the Imperialists returned, this time mounted on cavalry. Robert Monro realising the gravity of the situation resolved a plan to bring his men to safety. Monro ordered his pike-men to advance steadily and charge the horsemen, whom they quickly forced over the shelving edges of the pier. Monro and his men then escaped via ship to escape the Imperialists who had been reinforced by more cavalry.

=== Siege of Stralsund ===
In 1628 Robert Monro, then a major, along with his cousin, Robert Munro, 18th Baron of Foulis, both led their men at the Siege of Stralsund where they defended the town for six weeks against the Imperialists. One such assault on the city was made on 26 June when Imperialist General, Albrecht von Wallenstein arrived on the scene. The defenders having heard of his arrival expected a severe attack on their position. The assault was made that night between ten and eleven o'clock, directed chiefly against the post guarded by the Highlanders under Major Monro. The enemy advanced with above one thousand men and Highlanders were immediately called to arms, and after a severe battle which lasted for an hour and a half the Imperialists were driven back. However the Imperialists returned and continued to attack until the next morning when they finally forced open the gate and managed to get inside the "outworks" but were finally beaten back by the Highlanders with great loss, with swords, pikes and butts of muskets. The Imperialists retired having lost over a thousand men, while the Highlanders lost nearly two hundred. Relief for the defenders came when Alexander Leslie arrived with contingents of Scots, Swedes and Germans from the Swedish army. Leslie reorganised the defences and was made governor of the city. He used the Highland contingent in a spectacular assault on the enemy which finally broke the siege. As Monro recorded:

Sir Alexander Leslie being made governour, he resolved for the credit of his countrymen to make an out-fall upon the Enemy, and desirous to conferre the credit on his own Nation alone, being his first Essay in that Citie.

After the siege Major Robert Monro was promoted to lieutenant-colonel.

=== Siege of Schivelbein ===
In 1630, the MacKay and Munro Highlanders had marched to Schivelbein (Schiefelbein, now Świdwin) a small fortified place in Pomerania, known as Schivelbein Castle, in order to obstruct the passage of the Austrians, who were advancing for the relief of Kołobrzeg. They were commanded to hold the town as long as possible and to defend the castle or fort to the last man. How well they fulfilled this task an eloquent Latin Ode tells us, printed in front of Monro's Memoirs and bearing the title: "Schiefelbeinum urbs et arx Marchiae Brandenburgicae a generoso Domino Roberto Munro bene defensae". The five hundred Highlanders under Monro are said to have withstood a siege from an enemy of 8000 Imperialists

=== Siege of Neubrandenburg ===
In January 1631, the King accompanied by Colonel Monro, proceeded to besiege Neubrandenburg (New Brandenburg). The Highlanders soon stormed the palace and forced the defenders to retire from the town. The defending Austrians then sent a messenger to ask for a truce, which was granted. The garrison which according to Monro was a "brave little band of five hundred horse, and twelve hundred foot, being as complete to look at as you wish", allowed to "march out with bag and baggage, horse and foot, with full arms and a convoy to Havelburgh. The Swedish King left a small garrison in the town and the army proceeded on its way.

=== Frankfurt and Leipzig ===
Robert Monro later fought at the Battle of Frankfurt on the Oder, and the Battle of Breitenfeld in Leipzig in 1631, where the Scots and Swedes took victory on both occasions. However the Swedish army was later defeated at the Battle of Nördlingen (1634) and Monro's regiment was all but destroyed. Monro survived and returned to Scotland but later returned to Swedish service in May 1637 with fresh recruits.

== Bishops' Wars ==
Robert returned to Scotland about 1638, and took part in some of the early incidents of the Bishops Wars against Charles I and also in the Wars of the Three Kingdoms in service of the Scottish Covenanters. During the Bishops' Wars, in 1638 Dalkeith was won by Monro with 500 men, and in 1639 Monro was with Alexander Leslie when he captured Edinburgh Castle. General Robert Monro laid siege to the fortified Spynie Palace, forcing Bishop John Guthrie to surrender to his forces. This marked the end of Spynie Palace as a seat of power, which had been home to the Bishops of Moray for over 500 years. Also in 1640 General Monro laid siege to Drum Castle of the royalist Clan Irvine, which was surrendered after two days, and also occupied Huntly Castle of the Clan Gordon, along with a captain called James Wallace. Monro also led the forces that left Inchdrewer Castle, the family seat of George Ogilvy, 1st Lord Banff, in ruins.

== Irish Confederate Wars ==
=== Rebellion in Ulster ===
In 1642 he went to Ireland, nominally as second in command under Alexander Leslie, but in fact, in chief command of the Scottish army sent to put down the Catholic Irish rebels who had massacred Scottish settlers in Ulster during the Irish Rebellion of 1641. Monro's campaign in Ireland was largely confined to the northern province of Ulster. After taking and plundering Newry in April 1642, and ineffectually attempting to subdue Sir Phelim O'Neill, Monro succeeded in taking prisoner the Earl of Antrim who was Randal MacDonnell, 1st Marquess of Antrim at Dunluce Castle.

The arrival of Owen Roe O'Neill in Ireland strengthened the cause of the rebels, now organised in Confederate Ireland, and Monro, who was poorly supplied with provisions and war materials, showed little activity. Moreover, the English Civil War was now creating confusion among parties in Ireland, and the king was anxious to come to terms with the Catholic rebels, and to enlist them on his own behalf against the parliament. The Earl of Ormonde, Charles's lieutenant-general in Ireland, acting on the king's orders, signed a cessation of hostilities with the Catholic Confederates on 15 September 1643, and exerted himself to despatch aid to Charles in England.

=== Conflict in Ulster ===
Monro's strategy was just as ruthless and no measure was spared in his campaign against O'Neill. The conflict led to thousands of innocent people being killed on both sides. O'Neil waged a guerilla-type offensive in Ulster, whereas Monro, superior in numbers systematically destroyed castles and villages throughout the land. Some accounts tell of him laying waste to Antrim and Down in what we would now call a "scorched earth policy". Monro attacked and took Newry in 1642 and took Belfast in 1644. After taking Newry, Robert Monro then raised the Siege of Coleraine, a town which later became the centre of military activities and the headquarters of Major Daniel Munro during the coming years.

=== Belfast is seized ===
Monro in Ulster, holding his commission from the Parliament of Scotland dominated by the Covenanters, did not recognize the armistice, and his troops accepted the Solemn League and Covenant, in which they were joined by many English soldiers who left Ormonde to join him. In April 1644 the English parliament entrusted Monro with the command of all the forces in Ulster, both English and Scots. He thereupon seized Belfast, made a raid into the Pale, and unsuccessfully attempted to gain possession of Dundalk and Drogheda. In response, the Irish confederates sent an armed expedition to Scotland to join the Scottish Royalists there under James Graham, 1st Marquess of Montrose.

=== Battle of Benburb ===
Monro's force was weakened by the necessity of sending troops to Scotland to withstand Montrose. Meanwhile, Owen Roe O'Neill was strengthened by receiving supplies from the Papal Nuncio to Ireland, Giovanni Battista Rinuccini. On 5 June 1646 the Battle of Benburb was fought, on the Blackwater, where O'Neill routed Monro, inflicting over 2000 dead on the Scottish force but allowing him to withdraw in safety to Carrickfergus.

=== Conflict at Carrickfergus ===
In 1647 Ormonde was compelled to come to terms with the English parliament, which sent commissioners to Dublin in June of that year. Monro supported the royalist "Engager" movement and sent men under the command of his nephew George Munro, 1st of Newmore back to Scotland to support the Engagers against the English Parliamentarians. Meanwhile, the Scots under Monro held out stubbornly at Carrickfergus and refused to surrender Carrickfergus Castle and Belfast. They were besieged by the forces of George Monck. In September 1648 Carrickfergus was delivered over to Monck by treachery: a number of Monro's officers were divided and some aided the parliamentary commander Monck, and as a result, Monro was taken prisoner. He was committed to the Tower of London, where he remained a prisoner for five years. In 1654 he was permitted by Oliver Cromwell to reside in Ireland, where he had estates in right of his wife, who was the widow of Hugh Montgomery, 2nd Viscount Montgomery of Ardes. Monro continued to live quietly near Comber, County Down, for many years, and probably died there about 1680.

== Family ==
Robert Monro married after 1642 Lady Jean Alexander, daughter of William Alexander, 1st Earl of Stirling and Janet Erskine, and widow of Viscount Montgomery. He is known to have at least two children:

1. Andrew Monroe, a colonel who was killed at the Siege of Limerick (1690).
2. Ann Monro, who married her cousin, George Munro, 1st of Newmore.

== See also ==
- A Legend of Montrose, 19th-century novel by Walter Scott in which one character, Dugald Dalgetty, is partly based upon Monro
- "The Battle of Benburb", an Irish ballad about Monro's 1646 defeat to Owen Roe O'Neill
