= Essich =

Region of Scotland located between Inverness and Loch Ness

Coordinates: 57°25′32.9″N 4°15′6.8″W

Essich: Scottish Gaelic: Easaich
- Location within the Highland council area
- OS grid reference: NH6479639487
- Council area: Highland
- Lieutenancy area: Inverness-shire
- Country: Scotland
- Sovereign state: United Kingdom
- Police: Scotland
- Fire: Scottish
- Ambulance: Scottish

Essich (/ˈɛsɪx/, Scottish Gaelic: Easaich) is a region in the Scottish Highlands located between Inverness and Loch Ness in the historic county of Inverness-shire. It is located 2.7 kilometres south from the centre of Inverness and is serviced by Holm Primary School. The area is traversed by the Essich Burn.

== Geography ==
At the center of the area is Essich Farm, located next to the remains of Essich House. The local landscape is traversed by the Essich Burn, a small stream.

== History ==
There are no confirmed records of Essich dating from before approximately 1543; however, its existence is documented from that time onwards. Essich is recorded as the meeting place for local clan chiefs during the 16th and 17th centuries.
