= Sir Robert Munro, 3rd Baronet =

Scottish soldier and politician (died 1668)

Munro of Foulis coat of Arms

Sir Robert Munro, 3rd Baronet of Foulis (died 1668), 21st Baron and 24th chief of the Clan Munro was a 17th-century Scottish soldier and politician.

Robert succeeded to the head of his house upon the death of his cousin, Sir Hector Munro, 2nd Baronet of Foulis, who died at just 17 years of age in 1651. As the eldest surviving son of Col. John Munro, 2nd of Obsdale, his elder brother having pre-deceased him, Robert was the 4th head of the Munro of Obsdale family but was also a direct descendant and great-grandson of Robert Mor Munro, 15th Baron of Foulis (died 1588).

== Thirty Years' War ==
As a young man Robert entered the army in 1626 and became an officer in Donald Mackay's regiment, serving first in Danish service and later in Swedish service where he highly distinguished himself during the Thirty Years' War on the continent, particularly during the Battle of Lutzen in 1632. According to 19th-century historian Alexander Mackenzie there were three Generals, eight Colonels, five Lieutenant-Colonels, eleven Majors and above thirty Captains, besides a large number of other soldiers all of the name Munro in the Swedish army during the Thirty Years' War. However, although there were numerous colonels and lower ranks bearing the name of Monro or Munro during the Thirty Years' War, none actually held the rank of general in any of the continental armies between 1618 and 1648. It was most likely this man recorded as a major in the regiment of Colonel Robert Monro in 1639 (it had reformed in 1637), just prior to the regiment's return to Scotland.

== Sheriff of Ross and Inverness ==
On 26 August 1643, during the minority of the former chief, "the Estates of the Kingdom passed an Act for the Committees of War in the shires of Scotland", and among the Commissioners for the Sheriffdom of Sutherland and a part of Inverness-shire, occurs the name of "Sir Robert Munro, tutour of Foulles"; and again on 24 July 1644, in a commission for a similar purpose and for the same Sheriffdom is found the name of "Sir Robert Monro, Tutor of Foullis".

In 1649, the Scottish Parliament separated from the Sheriffdom of Inverness-shire the "lands eastward of Altnalait, Knockravock and the Royal Burgh of Tain", erected the Sheriffdom of Ross, and appointed the Marquiss of Argyll the Sheriff-Principal. Afterwards the commission was granted to Sir Robert Munro, who had been elected Member of Parliament for Inverness-shire in 1649 and for his own County of Ross after it was separated from the County of Inverness, 1649–50, to be Sheriff-Principal of the County of Ross.

In 1651, Robert succeeded to the head of his house, upon the death of his cousin Sir Hector Munro, 2nd Baronet of Foulis who died at just 17 years of age, as already mentioned. Robert took up his residence in Foulis Castle.

== Feud with Alexander Chisholm ==
In 1654, men of the Clan Chisholm raided lands belonging to Robert Munro, 3rd Baronet of Foulis. Valentine Chisholm and four other "delinquents" plundered 85 cows and 23 horses. Robert wisely pursued the matter through the courts of Oliver Cromwell. Robert Munro of Foulis accused Alexander Chisholm of Comar of allowing his kinsman to carry out the raid.

The court found Robert Munro of Foulis in favour and instructed Alexander Chisholm to produce Valentine Chisholm, who was "known for his barbarity", and his four followers in court within fifteen days, compensate Foulis and his kinsmen for their losses and also to provide a £1,000 bond as security for future good behaviour.

Whilst Robert Munro's lands were raided and his tenants abused, his younger brother George Munro, 1st of Newmore later commanded the king's forces in Scotland from 1674 to 1677.

== Family ==
Robert Munro married before he succeeded as 3rd Baronet of Foulis. He married his 2nd cousin Jean Munro, daughter of Sir Hector Munro, 1st Baronet of Foulis. They had eight children:

1. Sir John Munro, 4th Baronet of Foulis.
2. Hector Munro, who married Ann Fraser and according to historian Alexander Mackenzie, had seventeen children - all but two of which died in infancy.
3. David Munro, who attained the rank of captain in the Army.
4. Andrew Munro, who became a lieutenant colonel in the Army and married the Hon. Margaret Fraser, daughter of Hugh Fraser, 10th Lord Lovat.
5. William Munro.
6. Joseph Munro.
7. Daniel Munro.
8. Rebecca Munro, who married Colin Robertson, of Kindeace, and was the great-grandmother of Anne Mackenzie Robertson, wife of Sir John Gladstone, 1st Baronet, and mother of William Ewart Gladstone.
9. Janet Munro, who married John Ross, 5th of Little Tarrell.

Baronetage of Nova Scotia
Preceded by Hector Munro	Baronet (of Foulis); 1651–1668	Succeeded by John Munro
