= Mountgerald =

Coordinates: 57.61806°N 4.38878°W

Mountgerald: Scottish Gaelic: An Claon
- Location within the Ross and Cromarty area
- OS grid reference: NH574611
- Council area: Highland
- Country: Scotland
- Sovereign state: United Kingdom
- Post town: Dingwall
- Postcode district: IV17 0
- Police: Scotland
- Fire: Scottish
- Ambulance: Scottish

Mountgerald (Scottish Gaelic: An Claon) is a small hamlet which lies close to the head of the Cromarty Firth, on the west coast. It is 2 miles (3 km) northeast of Dingwall, in the eastern edge of Ross-shire, Scottish Highlands and is in the Scottish council area of Highland.

A set of cup and ring marked stones was found in the area in 1864.
