= Sir Hector Munro, 1st Baronet =

Scottish soldier, noble and clan chief

Munro of Foulis coat of Arms

Sir Hector Munro, 1st Baronet of Foulis was a Scottish soldier, noble and clan chief of the highland Clan Munro. He is also by tradition the 19th Baron and 22nd overall chief of the clan. He is however the 12th chief of the Clan Munro who can be proved by contemporary evidence.

Hector Munro, 1st Baronet was the younger brother of Robert Munro, 18th Baron of Foulis (the Black Baron) who left only daughters and was therefore succeeded in the chiefship of his clan by his younger brother Hector. They were both sons of Hector Munro, 17th Baron of Foulis.

== Thirty Years' War ==
Hector Munro, 1st Baronet was originally designated "of Clynes" indicating that he was bred for the church. However, early in life he embraced a military career. He was an officer of distinction in Sir Donald Mackay, 1st Lord Reay's regiment, along with his brother Robert, 18th Baron. Hector Munro served in the Thirty Years' War under Gustavus Adolphus of Sweden in his campaign in Germany.

== Baronetcy ==
Upon the death of his older brother Robert Munro, 18th Baron of Foulis in 1633, Hector Munro succeeded in his estates, and returned to Scotland in 1634 to take possession of the family estates and assume his position as head of the clan.

Hector Munro was received by Charles I in London, and shortly afterwards was created a Baronet of Nova Scotia.

The Royal patent, or diploma, conferring the title is dated 7 June 1634 and says the following:

Domino Hector de Foulis, militi baronetto, terrarum baronie et regalitates de Foulis in regimme Novar Scotiae in America, et haeredibus suis masculis quibuscunque

== Return to Germany ==
Having arranged his family affairs Sir Hector Munro, 1st Baronet returned to Germany to resume his military career in the war that still carried on there. He took shipping from Cromarty and landed safely in Hamburg in April 1635 but died that same month in that town. He was buried at "Buckstchood (Buxtehude) in the Old Land" on the river Elbe.

== Family ==
Sir Hector Munro, 1st Baronet had married in July 1619 at Tongue, Sutherland, in Scotland. He married Mary Mackay, daughter of Hugh Mackay of Farr, Sutherland, chief of the Clan Mackay. Mary was also the sister of Donald Mackay, 1st Lord Reay.

Sir Hector Munro, 1st Baronet and Mary Mackay had four children:

1. Sir Hector Munro, 2nd Baronet (successor as chief of the Clan Munro).
2. Jean Munro, who married her 2nd cousin Sir Robert Munro, 3rd Baronet.
3. Margaret Munro, who married Rev. Hector Munro, minister of Loth, Sutherland, with issue - Lieutenant Hector Munro and the Rev. John Munro.
4. Catherine Munro, who married William Munro, 4th of Teanoird, with issue - three sons and one daughter.

Baronetage of Nova Scotia
New creation	Baronet (of Foulis); 1634–1635	Succeeded by Hector Munro

== See also ==
- Munro Baronets
