= Huistean Du Mackay, 13th of Strathnaver =

Huistean Du Mackay (Hugh Mackay), 13th of Strathnaver (d. 1614), was the thirteenth chief of Clan Mackay, a Highland Scottish clan.

== Early life ==
Huistean Mackay was the eldest son from the second marriage of his father, Iye Du Mackay, 12th of Strathnaver, whose wife was Christian, daughter of John Sinclair of Duns, Caithness. Iye Du Mackay died in 1572 when Huistean was just eleven years of age.

== Sutherland-Caithness feud ==
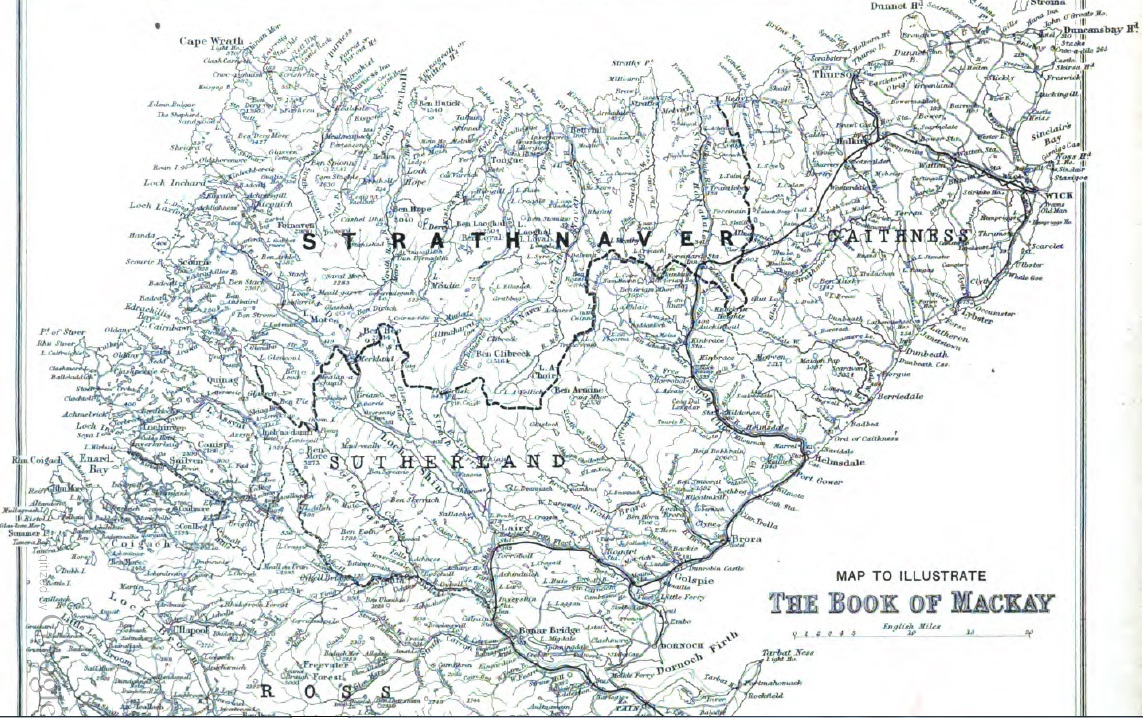
Map showing the territory of the Clan Mackay that was known as Strathnaver in relation to Sutherland and Caithness. The boundary is marked with a dashed line. (click to enlarge)

In the later half of the 16th century in the far north of Scotland, Alexander Gordon, 12th Earl of Sutherland (chief of Clan Sutherland) and George Sinclair, 4th Earl of Caithness (chief of Clan Sinclair) were at deadly feud with each other. Alexander Gordon, Earl of Sutherland, was supported by his relative George Gordon, 5th Earl of Huntly (chief of Clan Gordon), whose sister the Earl of Sutherland married. Between the two sides was Huistean Mackay, who supported both but was in a weak position, being at the head of a divided clan.

The dispute among the Clan Mackay was over who was the rightful chief. Some believed that John Beg Mackay and Donald Balloch Mackay, who were born from Iye Du Mackay's first marriage, were rightful chiefs. However, this marriage was an irregular one under canon law as it was a marriage of first cousins. Others supported Huistean Mackay. When Huistean obtained legal possession of his lands he gave Scourie to Donald Balloch Mackay, only surviving son from the first marriage. This served as a settlement but the two families remained disunited.

Huistean Mackay and his younger brother William Mackay, 1st of Bighouse were initially supporters of George Sinclair, Earl of Caithness. Huistean had even resided at Castle Sinclair Girnigoe until he was old enough to lead his own clan. In the meantime John Beg Mackay had been in control of the Mackay lands of Strathnaver; however the Earl of Caithness had instigated the Mackays of Aberach, a powerful and very much independent branch of the Mackays to attack him on a plea of alleged unfaithfulness to Huistean Mackay. The Mackays of Aberach did this along with the MacLeods of Assynt, killing John Beg Mackay, William Gunn (chieftain of the Robson Gunns) and others at Balnakeil in the parish of Durness in 1579, and the chieftain of Clan Matheson barely escaped with his life. This left Huistean Mackay's followers divided. On the one side were the Robson Gunns and Mathesons and on the other side were the MacLeods of Assynt and the Mackays of Aberach. Huistean Mackay chose to oppose the Aberachs. The Aberach Mackays then rushed to the open arms of the Earl of Sutherland.

Historian Angus Mackay states that as long as Huistean Mackay and Sinclair, Earl of Caithness stood together they were more than a match for the Earl of Sutherland, notwithstanding the defection of some Mackay clansman (the Aberachs). By 1585, Gordon, Earl of Sutherland and Gordon, Earl of Huntly stood together with the support of the Aberach Mackays and the MacLeods of Assynt. On the other side stood George Sinclair, 5th Earl of Caithness, Huistean Mackay, chief of Clan Mackay and the Robson Gunns. In 1585, Gordon, Earl of Sutherland and Gordon, Earl of Huntly held a meeting at Elgin along with Sinclair, Earl of Caithness in an attempt to break up Sinclair's confederacy with Huistean Mackay and the Gunns. Sinclair was offered Huntly's sister in marriage if he destroyed the Gunns. A second meeting was called at Dunrobin Castle in which Huistean Mackay also attended. Mackay refused the Gordon's proposals but Sinclair, Earl of Caithness agreed with the Gordons that the Gunns should be destroyed. In 1586, the forces of the Earl of Caithness and the Earl of Sutherland pursued the Gunns from Caithness and into the hills of Strathnaver. At this time a strange coincidence took place: William Mackay of Bighouse (younger brother of Huistean) had raided the MacLeods taking much cattle. As William Mackay was returning home he came across the Earl of Sutherland's men who were searching for the Gunns and a fight took place over the cattle. William Mackay's men fought a rear guard action and the following morning stumbled across the Gunns who were retiring from the Sinclairs of Caithness. Together the Mackays and Gunns attacked the Sinclairs of Caithness defeating them and killing their leader Henry Sinclair, cousin of the Earl of Caithenss. This was known as the Battle of Allt Camhna.

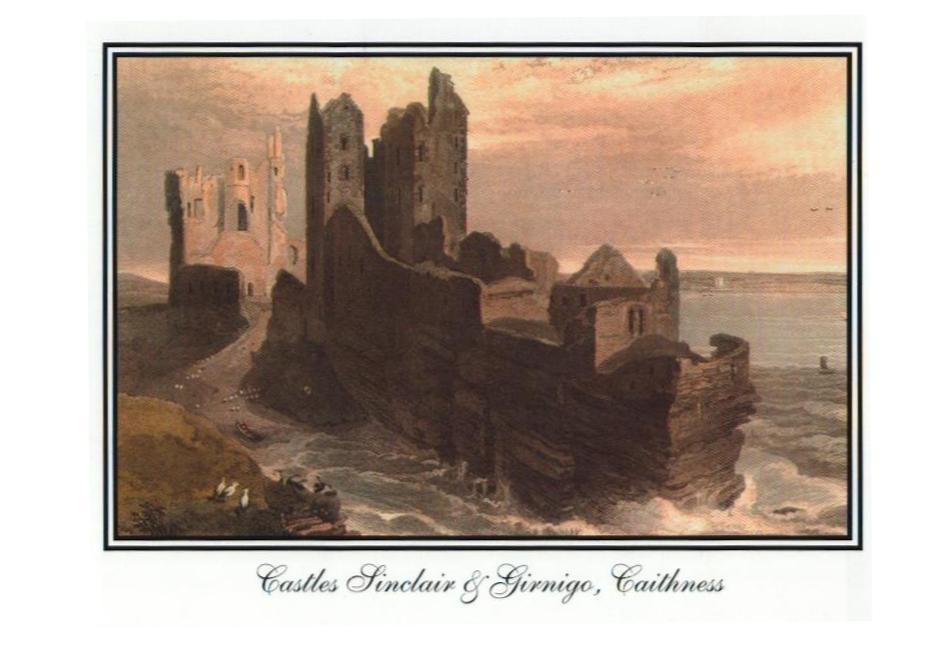
Castle Sinclair Girnigoe, as painted in 1821

Huistean Du Mackay at this time had been residing at Castle Sinclair Girnigoe and had to flee for his life back to Strathnaver and the Gunns, realizing the Mackays could not protect them retired to Ross-shire only to be defeated at the Battle of Leckmelm by the Mackays of Aberach, MacLeods and Sutherlands.

The new alliance between Gordon, Earl of Sutherland and Sinclair, Earl of Caithness did not last long and soon they were feuding again. In February 1587, the Sinclairs killed Gordon of Marle and made preparations to invade Sutherland. In March the Earl of Caithness, supported by Huistean Du Mackay advanced on Sutherland where they found the Earl supported by Mackintosh, Mackenzie of Redcastle and Munro of Contullich Castle, who were posted on the west bank of the river. For some days there was skirmishing between the two armies on both sides of the water. The Earl of Sutherland sent Mackintosh across to try to persuade Huistean Mackay to desert the Earl of Caithness. The Earl of Sutherland himself also met with the Earl of Caithness, who agreed terms that excluded Mackay. On hearing of this Mackay marched his men back to Strathnaver, thus ending the alliance between Mackay and Caithness.

In December 1589, Huistean Mackay married Lady Jane Gordon, daughter of the Earl of Sutherland. The Earl of Sutherland having gained the support of Mackay swept into Caithness accompanied by Mackay, Mackintosh and Munro. They swept the county to the walls of Castle Sinclair Girnigoe. The castle was too strong to take without artillery and so they sacked the town of Wick. The family of Sinclair never again held the same commanding position in northern politics. That same year McHamish Gunn, chief of the Clan Gunn, again wasted Caithness with great ferocity. In 1590, the Earl of Caithness invaded Sutherland in person fighting stubbornly and advancing as far as Brora. In the meantime Mackay slipped into Caithness and spoiled it to the gates of Thurso. The feud continued for many years after. In 1601, the Earl of Caithness's army lined up in front of the Earl of Sutherland's which included Huistean Mackay, Munro of Contullich and MacLeod of Assynt. The Caithness men retreated without a fight.

A contemporary historian, Sir Robert Gordon, writes of Huistean Du Mackay in one of the battles against the forces of Sinclair, Earl of Caithness:

Mackay, with bold adventure of his own person, of all the rest most forward...crossed the water which was betuin him and the enemie, with some few gentlemen in his company...and although the danger was apparent, yet the Sutherland men were ashamed to forsake him, who did fight so manfullie in their defense, with a resolute courage and undaunted heart

== Later life and family ==
Huistean Du Mackay's first marriage was to Lady Elizabeth Sinclair, daughter of George Sinclair, 4th Earl of Caithness, whom he divorced but had had one daughter with, Christina who married John Mackintosh of Davell, younger son of Lachlan Mor Mackintosh, 16th of Mackintosh. He married secondly (as mentioned above) Lady Jane Gordon, daughter of Alexander Gordon, 12th Earl of Sutherland, and had the following two sons and two daughters:

1. Donald Mackay, 1st Lord Reay, heir and successor as chief of the Clan Mackay.
2. John Mackay, 1st of Strathy, also progenitor of the Mackays of Skerray.
3. Annas Mackay, who married John Sinclair of Brims, Caithness.
4. Mary Mackay, who married Sir Hector Munro, 1st Baronet, chief of the Clan Munro.

Huistean Du Mackay died on 2 September 1614 at Tongue and was succeeded by his eldest son.

== See also ==
- Chiefs of Clan Mackay
- Clan Mackay
- Earl of Sutherland
- Clan Sutherland
- Earl of Caithness
- Clan Sinclair

== Bibliography ==
- Gordon, Sir Robert (1813) [Printed from original manuscript 1580 - 1656]. A Genealogical History of the Earldom of Sutherland. Edinburgh: A. Constable.
- Mackay, Angus, M.A (1906). The Book of Mackay. 25 George IV Bridge, Edinburgh: Norman MacLeod.
