= Kiltearn =

Parish in Highland, Scotland

Coordinates: 57.66393°N 4.33555°W

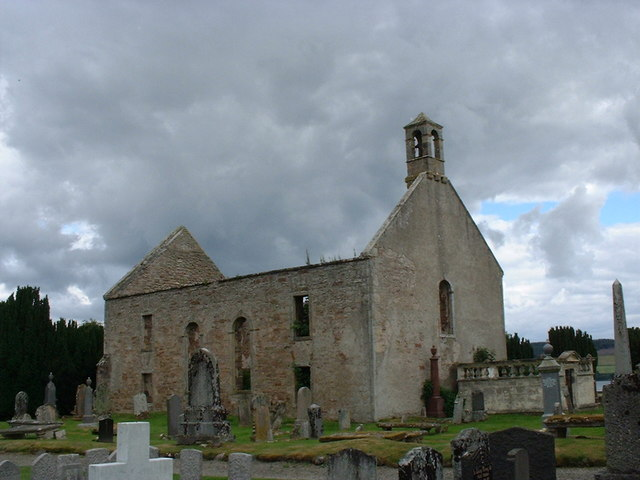
Old Kiltearn church

Kiltearn (Gaelic: Cill Tighearna) is a parish in Ross and Cromarty, Scotland. It is in the Presbytery of Ross. The local landowners since the 11th century reign of Malcolm II have been the Clan Munro.

The principal settlement is the village of Evanton, and the parish extends almost to Dingwall and about halfway to Alness. The old Kiltearn church and burial ground are on the shore of the Cromarty Firth. The church is ruinous but dates from 1790. The current Kiltearn Parish Church (Church of Scotland) is on Balconie Street in Evanton. (Not to be confused with Kiltearn Free Church of Scotland on Chapel Road.)

For many years the manse was adjacent to the old church, but the building fell into disrepair and a new one was constructed a short distance away in 1894: it is now known as Kiltearn House. The New Manse was built on Swordale Road in 1976.

== Old Parish Church ==
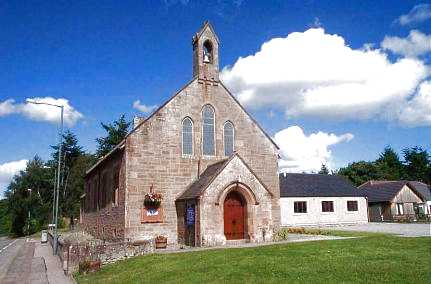
Kiltearn Parish Church

Kiltearn Old Parish Church, now a ruin, dates back to 1227 and is the historic burial place of the Munros.

According to 19th-century historian Alexander Mackenzie, Robert Mor Munro, 15th Baron of Foulis who died in 1588 was the first Munro chief to be buried at Kiltearn and break away from his ancestor's usual custom of being buried at Chanonry. George Munro, 1st of Obsdale (died 1589) was buried at Kiltearn.

Mackenzie also states that the following Munro chiefs were also buried at Kiltearn: Robert Munro, 16th Baron of Foulis (died 1589), Hector Munro, 17th Baron of Foulis (d.1603), Sir Robert Munro, 3rd Baronet (died 1666), Sir John Munro, 4th Baronet (d.1697), and Sir Robert Munro, 5th Baronet (d.1729).

The 16th-century churchman Donald Munro was buried in Kiltearn, "a little to the east of the burial ground of the family of Foulis", although the grave is not marked.

The controversial minister Thomas Hog (died 1692) is also buried here. He was deposed from the parish in 1661, before returning from exile in 1688.

The Very Rev Murdoch MacQueen Moderator of the General Assembly of the Free Church of Scotland who died in 1912 is buried there. The churchyard contains several Polish war graves from the Second World War.
