= Lemlair House =

Building in Highland, Scotland

Coordinates: 57°37′39″N 4°23′3″W

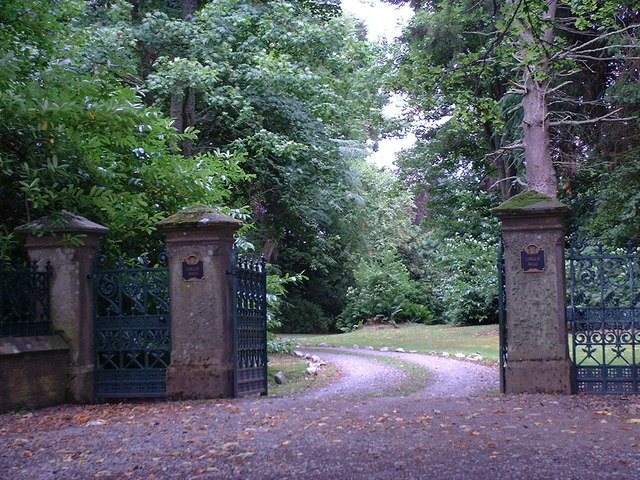
Entrance to Lemlair House

Lemlair House is a mansion house in the parish of Kiltearn, Ross-shire, in the Highland council area of the Scottish Highlands.

== History ==
A 17th century manuscript of the Clan Mackenzie claims that the Mackenzies burnt the Clan Munro lands of Lemlair in the aftermath of the Battle of Logiebride in 1597. The lands of Lemlair were made into a barony direct from the Crown in 1643 for Colonel John Munro of Lemlair who was a leading supporter of the National Covenant and who opposed Charles I of England's church innovations. In 1738 the lands of Lemlair reverted to the chief of the Clan Munro and later went through a period of Mackenzie ownership when it was connected with the neighboring Mountgerald. It was later bought back by another member of the Munro family.

The name "Lemlair" is thought to come from the Gaelic for "a bare place suitable for grazing horses".

=== Rebuilding ===
In 1859, it was bought from Sir Charles Munro of Foulis by "Red John" Munro and it was Red John's grandson, another John, who rebuilt it into the present mansion with its internal fittings featuring the Munro eagle in 1876. He moved into the house in 1879 and it has had only three owners since then.

=== Lemlair today ===
The mansion is set in 6 acres (24,000 m^{2}) of grounds. The building features a Rennie Mackintosh tiled fireplace and mantelpiece, a snooker room, a tiled-floor veranda overlooking the firth, a tennis court, eight bedrooms, stained-glass windows and Munro clan features such as a fireplace depicting the famous eagle emblem. The house has recently been extensively refurbished including exterior woodwork to bring the house back to original standard.

The area boasts excellent fishing, shooting and stalking and countryside walks.
