= Munro of Obsdale =

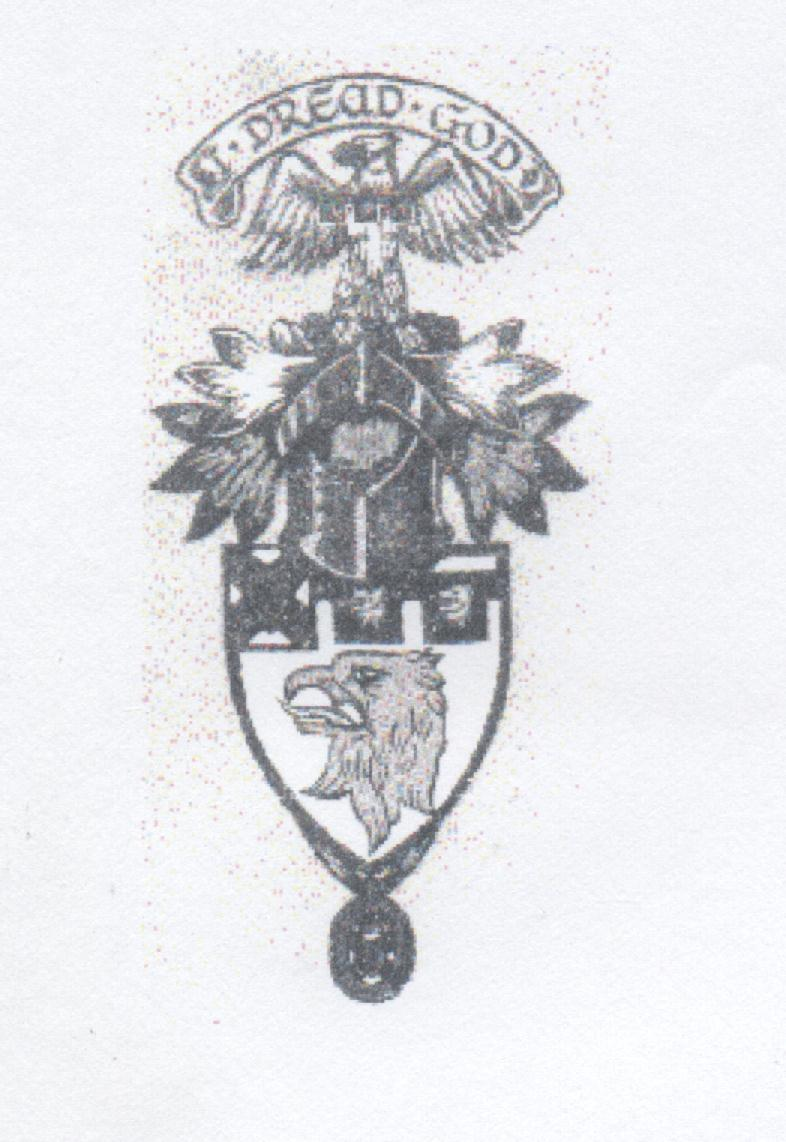
Munro of Obsdale coat of arms. Later styled of Foulis-Obsdale

The Munros of Obsdale were a Scottish family and a cadet branch of the Clan Munro, a Highland Scottish clan. Their base was at Obsdale House, situated just north of the town of Alness in the Scottish Highlands. Some of the members of the Munro of Obsdale family were amongst the most distinguished Scottish military officers of the 17th century.

== George Munro, I of Obsdale ==
George Munro, 1st of Obsdale was the fourth son of Robert Mor Munro, 15th Baron of Foulis, chief of the Clan Munro. However, George was the first son born from Robert's second marriage to Kathrine Ross, daughter of the chief of Clan Ross. George received the lands of Obsdale in Alness, as his patrimony. George married a distant relative, Catherine Munro, fifth daughter of Andrew Munro, 5th of Milntown, with issue, among others:

1. John Munro, 2nd of Obsdale (see below)
2. Robert Monro, who was one of the most distinguished officers of his time. Robert fought under Gustavus Adolphus during the Thirty Years' War in Europe where he rose to the rank of general. He later returned to Scotland and took part in the Bishops' Wars. In the 1640s Robert went to Ireland where he commanded the Scottish Covenanter army during the Irish Confederate Wars. However, in 1648 Monro was betrayed and captured by his enemy Oliver Cromwell who imprisoned him in the Tower of London. Robert was later released in 1654 but was only permitted to reside in Ireland where he died in about 1680.
3. Daniel Munro, 1st of Lower Iveagh, a major in the army who is stated by Horace Monroe, writing in 1929, to have been brother of Robert. However, the Foulis Writs that are more contemporary and remained lost until 1931 show that this Daniel Munro was actually from the Munro of Kiltearn branch of the clan. Daniel fought alongside Robert in the Irish Confederate Wars and was granted lands in the Barony of Lower Iveagh, Ireland in 1666 for services to the Crown.
4. Ulysses Munro, who according to the 1977 edition of the Clan Munro Magazine the French Munros claim descent from as a son of George Munro of Obsdale (died 1589).

== John Munro, II of Obsdale ==
John Munro, 2nd of Obsdale, like his younger and more distinguished brother General Robert Monro, adopted a military profession and served on the Continent under Gustavus Adolphus during the Thirty Years' War. The brothers took ship from Cromarty on 10 October 1626 and on arrival were joined by that King's army. John Munro soon attained the rank of colonel, and in 1628 returned to Scotland to recruit his regiment.

On 14 May 1630 John Munro is one of the jury in the general service at Inverness, of John Gordon, 13th Earl of Sutherland, chief of Clan Sutherland, as heir to William, the first Earl. Amongst other members of the Clan Munro present were: Robert Munro of Assynt, John Munro of Lemlair, Hector Munro of Findon, and Andrew Munro of Novar. At the same time and place the same Earl was served heir by the same jury to John de Moravia, 9th Earl of Sutherland.

John Munro returned to Germany in 1630 accompanied by a considerable number of his clansmen. One of the most notable incidents of John Munro, 2nd of Obsdale's career during this war was a severe engagement at the pass in Oldenburg, where he distinguished himself highly and escaped unhurt, while his brother Robert was wounded in the knee. For the next three years he commanded a Scots regiment under Gustavus Adolphus. John Munro, 2nd of Obsdale was killed at Wetteraw on the Rhine, on 11 March 1633. Historian Sir Robert Gordon said of him that "he was a man imbued with many good points, and by his industry and venture purchased to himself and to his children good means and possessions under the Earl of Sutherland's wings."

John had married Catherine, daughter of John Gordon of Embo with issue:

1. John Munro, 3rd of Obsdale. (see below)
2. Robert Munro, 4th of Obsdale. (see below)
3. George Munro, 1st of Newmore (and Culrain - from who the present chief of Clan Munro is descended). George Munro was seated at Newmore Castle and was one of the most distinguished members of his family. He fought alongside his brothers and uncle in the Thirty Years' War, where he rose to the rank of major-general. He later fought under his uncle, Robert during the Irish Confederate Wars and during the Civil War in Scotland. George Munro was knighted by Charles II in 1649 in Holland. George later returned to the wars in Ireland and also took part in the Royalist rising of 1651 to 1654. After the Restoration of Charles II, Sir George Munro, 1st of Newmore commanded the King's forces between 1674 and 1677.
4. Andrew Munro of Daan, who was a lieutenant in the army.
5. Alexander Munro, who was a lieutenant-colonel in Dumbarton's regiment and served in France, and whose descendants reside in France. In order for Alexander to marry a French lady it became necessary for him to gain her family's consent to prove that he was of gentle birth. With this in view Alexander Munro applied to Charles I for a "Birth Brief", in which he was successful and married a French lady of noble birth, named Rachel Rolliack, with issue.
6. David Munro, who was a major in the army of Charles I.
7. Janet Munro.
8. Christian Munro.

== John Munro III of Obsdale ==
John Munro, 3rd of Obsdale followed in his father's footsteps of a military career and attained the rank of captain. However, he drowned at sea in 1639 and was succeeded by his younger brother Robert.

== Robert Munro IV of Obsdale ==
Robert Munro, 4th of Obsdale was MP for the county of Inverness in 1649 and in the same year succeeded his cousin Sir Hector Munro, 2nd Baronet (of Foulis, chief of Clan Munro) as the Parliamentary representative for Ross-shire. On the death of his cousin Sir Hector in December 1651 Robert Munro, 4th of Obsdale succeeded as the nearest surviving male descendant of Robert Mor Munro, 15th Baron of Foulis as not only chief of the Clan Munro but also as Baronet of Foulis. After Sir Hector, 11th baronet died in 1935 the chieftaincy passed to his daughter and was separated from the baronetcy. From 1954, the baronets were styled "of Foulis-Obsdale" to distinguish their Arms and Designation from those of Munro of Foulis. See article: Munro baronets for further generations.

== 18th century ==
The Obsdale title was later used by another member of the same Munro family in the 18th century; the younger brother of Sir Robert Munro, 6th Baronet was Dr Duncan Munro who was styled "of Obsdale". They died together at the Battle of Falkirk Muir in 1746.
