= Donald Mackay, 1st Lord Reay =

Scottish noble (1591–1649)

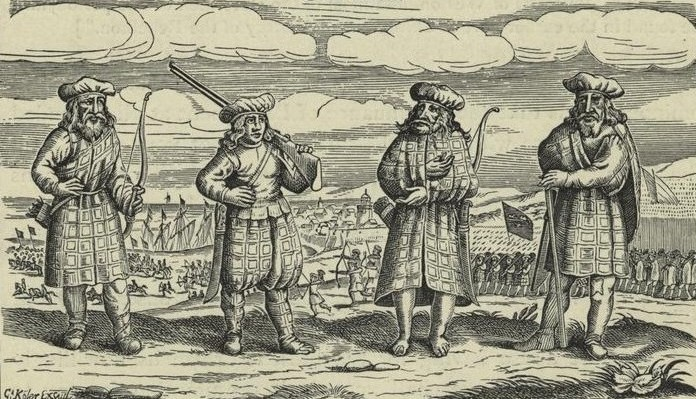
Soldiers of Mackay's Regiment

Donald Mackay, 1st Lord Reay, 14th of Strathnaver (March 1591 – February 1649) was a Scottish soldier and member of Parliament. He played a prominent role in the Thirty Years' War, raising a regiment of 3,000 men, which served in both the Danish and Swedish forces. He was later an unwilling Covenanter. He was the fourteenth chief of Clan Mackay, a Highland Scottish clan.

== Early life ==
Donald Mackay was the eldest son of Huistean Du Mackay, 13th of Strathnaver, and wife Lady Jane Gordon, eldest daughter of Alexander Gordon, 12th Earl of Sutherland, and second wife Lady Jean Gordon.

== Military career ==
=== Clan feuds in Scotland ===
Allan Cameron of Lochiel, chief of the Clan Cameron came into much trouble due to the claims of superiority made over him by the rival houses of the Earl of Argyll (chief of Clan Campbell) and the Earl of Huntly (chief of Clan Gordon). Cameron was initially a supporter of Huntly, but later transferred his allegiance over to Argyll. Huntly brought the matter before the Privy Council of Scotland who issued a commission to Fraser the Lord Lovat, Mackenzie of Gairloch, Mackenzie of Kintail and Mackay of Farr for the apprehension of Allan Cameron. Donald Mackay took part in the subsequent operations together with his uncle Sir Robert Gordon, 1st Baronet, and with 300 men they proceeded as far as the town of Inverness in August, 1612 and again on 9 December 1613. A levy of Mackays and Gordons having been summoned from the north by the Council to pursue Allan Cameron. In the second expedition Donald Mackay and Gordon of Embo marched with 450 men into the heart of Lochaber to co-operate with other troops. However, Allan Cameron, with the help of the Earl of Argyll, managed to hold his own.

Between the years 1612 and 1623 a feud was fought between Sir Robert Gordon, 1st Baronet who was tutor to his nephew the Earl of Sutherland, against the Earl of Caithness (chief of Clan Sinclair). Gordon tried to get Donald Mackay to join him in his campaign against the Earl of Caithness, but Mackay took no part in it.

In April 1616 Donald Mackay went to London with his uncle, Sir Robert Gordon, 1st Baronet, and was knighted by the king.

On 20 August 1623, Sir Donald McKay of Strathnaver was appointed by the Privy Council of Scotland a Justice of the Peace for Sutherland and Strathnaver. On 11 November 1623 the inhabitants of Strathnaver petitioned to the Council through Mackay to be exempted from the prohibition to carry fire-arms, which had previously been passed against the inhabitants of the diocese of Caithness, and as such they had not been able to defend themselves against Sir Robert Gordon.

=== Thirty Years' War ===
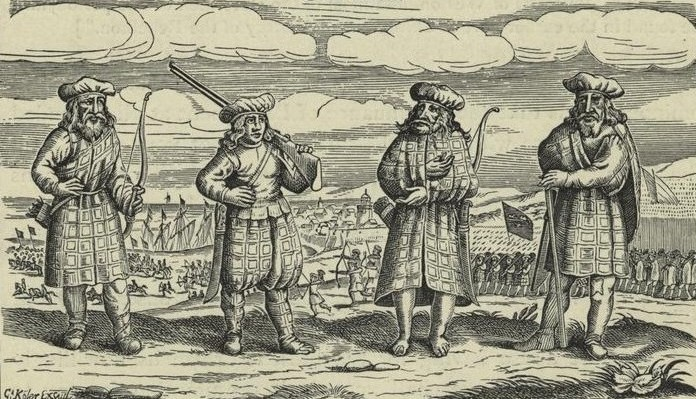
A 17thC German print assumed to show men of Donald Mackay's Regiment in Stettin during the Thirty Years' War. The original caption states, "They are a strong and hardy people who survive on little food. If they have no bread, they eat roots [turnips may be intended]. When necessary, they can cover more than 20 German miles in a day's forced march. [1 German mile = 4¾ English miles] Besides muskets, they carry bows, quivers and long swords."

In 1626, Sir Donald Mackay embarked with 3000 men at Cromarty under Count Mansfeld for the Thirty Years' War in the service of the king of Denmark alongside their colonel, Robert Monro. In March 1627 Sir Donald Mackay was created a Baronet of Nova Scotia, and in 1628 was elevated in the peerage as Lord Reay. In 1630, Donald Mackay, 1st Lord Reay accompanied his regiment to Germany, and was present at the capture of Stettin and Colberg. The following year in 1631, Lord Reay was empowered by Charles I of England to raise another force of men for service with Gustavus Adolphus, king of Sweden. He quarreled with David Ramsay at the English Court and, having challenged him to a duel, both were imprisoned in the Tower of London to preserve the peace. During 1632, Gustavus Adolphus, king of Sweden was killed at the Battle of Lützen and Lord Reay was not repaid large sums of money due to him by the king.

=== Civil War ===
In 1638, James Graham, 1st Marquess of Montrose and the Lords Home, Boyd and Loudoun invited Donald Mackay, 1st Lord Reay to meet them and others to consider the religious troubles of the time and to sign the Covenant, which he did unwillingly, along with his son, John Mackay, Master of Reay, because of his long attachment to Charles I. In 1644, like Montrose, Lord Reay again espouses the cause of Charles I of England in the English Civil War, and aided Lord Crawford for several months at the Siege of Newcastle, in the defence of the city against the Scots army. When the town was captured by General Leslie, Lord Reay and Lord Crawford were sent as prisoners to Edinburgh Castle. In 1645, following Montrose's victory at the Battle of Kilsyth, Lord Reay was liberated from imprisonment and returned home. In January 1649, Charles I was executed. Donald Mackay, 1st Lord Reay having fought for Charles I during the civil war was to be created Earl of Strathnaver but the royal patent was not completed and Reay went into exile in Denmark where he died in February 1649.

== Family ==
Donald Mackay, 1st Lord Reay, married firstly, in August 1610, Barbara, daughter of Kenneth Mackenzie, 1st Lord Mackenzie of Kintail, Chief of Clan Mackenzie and had the following children:

1. Iye Mackay, died 1617.
2. John Mackay, 2nd Lord Reay, 15th of Strathnaver, who succeeded his father.
3. Hew Mackay, died unmarried before 1642.
4. Lieutenant-Colonel Angus Mackay, progenitor of the Mackay of Melness branch of the clan.
5. Jane Mackay, married William Mackay, 3rd of Bighouse.
6. Mary Mackay, married Sir Roderick Macleod, 1st of Talisker, second son of Roderick MacLeod of MacLeod, chief of Clan MacLeod.

Donald Mackay, 1st Lord Reay married secondly in 1631 or before, Elizabeth Thomson, who died in about June 1637, leaving one daughter:

1. Ann Mackay, who married Alexander Macdonald, brother of Sir James Macdonald, Chief of the Clan Macdonald of Sleat.

Donald Mackay, 1st Lord Reay married thirdly, a daughter of Francis Sinclair of Stirkoke, Caithness and had the following children:

1. William Mackay, who married Ann, daughter of Col. Hugh Mackay of Scoury.
2. Charles Mackay, progenitor of the Mackay of Sandwood branch of the clan.
3. Rupert Mackay, twin brother of Charles and who died unmarried.
4. Margaret Mackay, who died at Thurso, unmarried in 1720.
5. Christian Mackay, who married Alexander Gunn of Killeranan, chieftain of the MacHamish Gunns of Clan Gunn.

Donald Mackay, 1st Lord Reay also married fourthly Rachel Winterfield or Harrison, sometime before 1631, but this marriage was annulled.

== Bibliography ==
- Mackay, Robert (1829). History of the House and Clan of Mackay. Edinburgh: Andrew Jack & Co.
- Way, George; Squire, Romily (1994). Collins Scottish Clan & Family Encyclopedia. Glasgow: HarperCollins, Foreword by The Rt Hon. The Earl of Elgin KT, Convenor, The Standing Council of Scottish Chiefs. ISBN 0-00-470547-5.
- Kidd, Charles; Williamson, David, eds. (1990). Debrett's Peerage and Baronetage. New York: St. Martin's Press.
- Leigh Rayment's Peerage Page

== See also ==
- Chiefs of Clan Mackay
- Clan Mackay
- Sir Robert Gordon, 1st Baronet
- Earl of Sutherland
- Lord Reay

Peerage of Scotland
New creation	Lord Reay; 1628–1649	Succeeded by John Mackay
Baronetage of Nova Scotia
New creation	Baronet (of Strathnaver); 1627–1649	Succeeded by John Mackay
