= Foulis Castle =

Castle in Scotland

Coordinates: 57°38′42″N 4°21′55″W

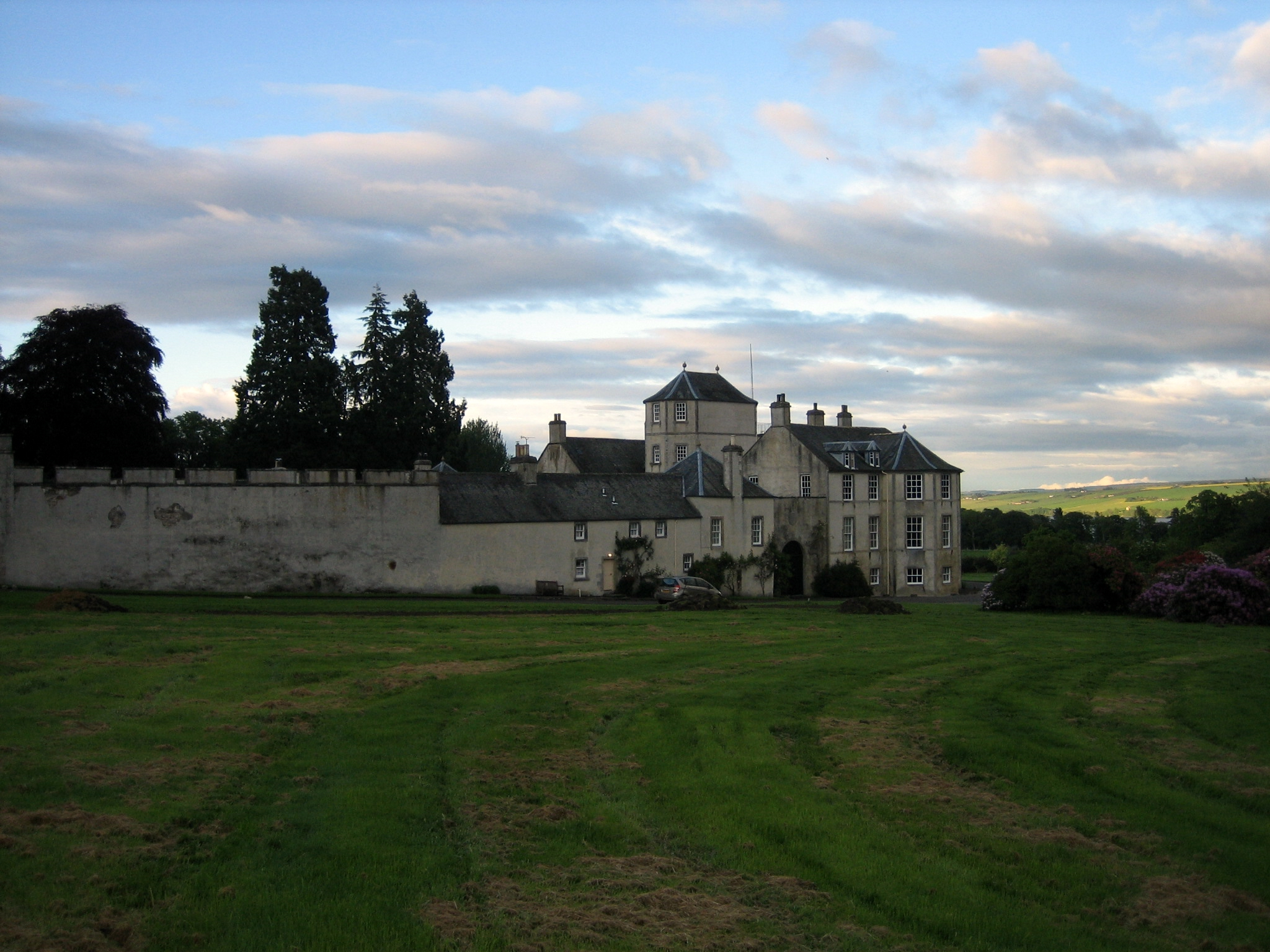
Foulis Castle

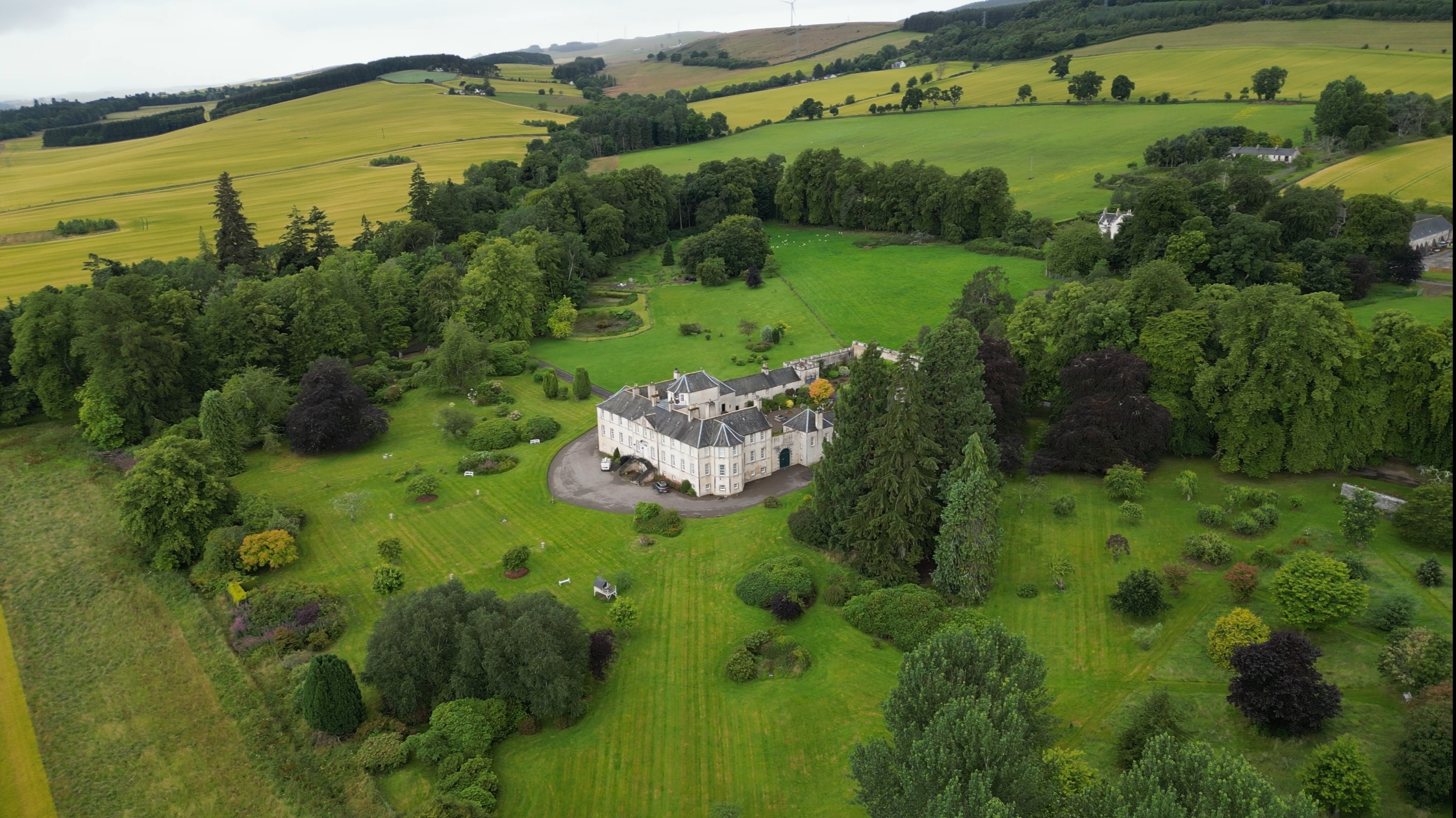
Drone view of Foulis Castle

Foulis Castle is situated two miles south-west of Evanton in the parish of Kiltearn, Ross and Cromarty, Scotland. It is a white washed mansion that incorporates an old tower house with gun loops. The castle was held by the Clan Munro from the twelfth century or earlier and they had a stronghold there.

The remains of an 11th-century Motte (man-made mound topped by a wooden palisade), believed to be the first fortification at Foulis, still remain in the castle grounds today.

== Early history ==
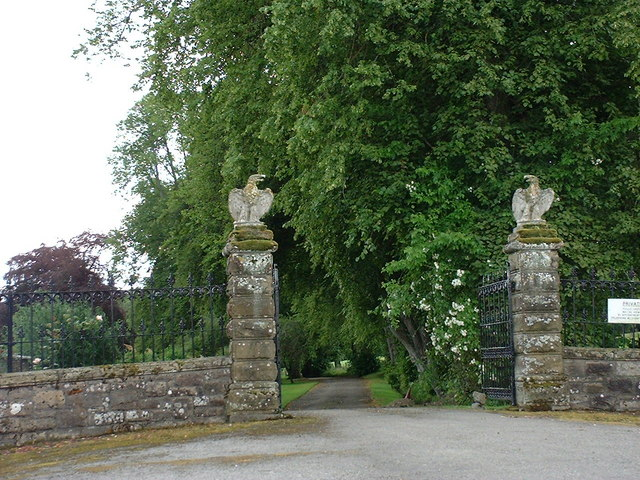
Entrance to Foulis Castle, note the golden eagles on each pillar, symbols of the Clan Munro

Foulis Castle itself is mentioned briefly in records that date back to the 14th century although the original Tower of Foulis was believed to have been built in 1154. It is recorded by contemporary evidence that Uilleam III, Earl of Ross granted a charter to Robert de Munro of Foulis for the lands of "Estirfowlys" with the "Tower of Strathskehech" from 1350. It is also recorded that Euphemia I, Countess of Ross granted two charters to Robert's son, Hugh Munro, 9th Baron of Foulis in 1394. One of them dated 4 May 1394 is in respect of the "Wesstir Fowlys" and the "Tower of Strathschech", named so because of the River Sgitheach that passes through nearby Strath Skiach and into the Cromarty Firth.

A document signed and sealed at Foulis Castle in 1491 reads in Gaelic "caisteal biorach, nead na h-iolair", which means "castle gaunt-peaked, the eagle's nest". This is in allusion to the clan chief's heraldic emblem.

In 1542 Donald Mackay of Strathnaver, chief of the Clan Mackay was imprisoned in Foulis Castle, when he was captured after the Battle of Alltan-Beath. According to Fraser's Wardlaw manuscript which was written in the 17th century, because of the Munro's kindness and civility towards Donald Mackay "to this day" a correspondence was linked between the Munros and Mackays.

The castles "tower and fortalice" are also mentioned in a charter from the crown in 1587. In times of clan warfare, a signal beacon was lit on the highest tower of Foulis Castle to gather the clan under arms, hence the Munro slogan or gathering cry of "Caisteal Foghlais na theine," meaning Castle Foulis ablaze.

The castle survived up to the 18th century until it was attacked by Jacobites in 1746. Sir Robert Munro, 6th Baronet was killed at the Battle of Falkirk Muir in 1746 and the castle was sacked and burned by the Jacobites in the same year.

Sir Robert Munro's son the next successive chief, Sir Harry Munro, 7th Baronet returned home from captivity to find the castle had been set on fire and much of the castle had been destroyed. The Jacobites were defeated just a few months later by Government forces at the Battle of Culloden. Sir Harry Munro set about rebuilding the castle incorporating what he could of the original building. However as the Battle of Culloden had brought a complete end to the Highland clan system there was no need for such a defensive fort anymore. As with many castles at this time it was re-built as a large classical mansion between 1754 and 1792 as it appears today. Foulis Castle still remains the home of the Chief of Munro, Hector W Munro of Foulis. However the most recent baronets of Foulis-Obsdale have lived in Southern England.

== Restoration ==
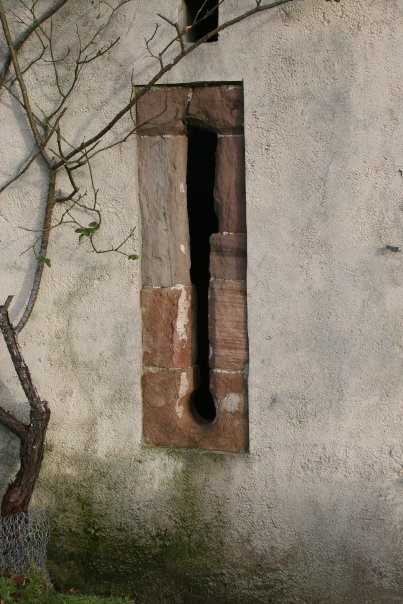
Some of the original castle fortifications showing under later walled construction

No records survive of what the fortifications at Castle Foulis looked like before 1746. Some evidence was discovered in the 1746 restoration. It is thought that the castle was surrounded by a series of smaller dwellings, of possibly a fortified nature. They found in 1957–59 evidence to suggest that in the courtyard area horses and cattle were kept, and that it was a self-contained community able to withstand a siege when attacked.

The Tower was a fortification, as its walls at the ground level are five feet six inches thick. In May 1985, while repairs were being carried out in part to the Courtyard building, Four "cannon loops of an inverted key hole type," dating from the early part of the 16th century, were discovered behind four wedge-shaped, blocked-up apertures facing north, south, east and west in the wall. Above them is a barrel-vaulted stone ceiling.

This building, at one time separate from the Castle, had certainly been constructed as a small defensive fort with an all-round "field of fire" to guard against possible attack.

At some later date, perhaps after 1746 and when the Chief felt that the chances of attack had lessened, the use of this building had changed. Three of the apertures had been completely blocked while the fourth had been partially blocked, leaving a narrow slit six inches wide and three feet long, into which a three-quarter-inch iron bar was strongly built, giving light, some air and access through which food could be passed to the unfortunate prisoner. It was likely the castle's gaol. According to Munro sources, some of the stone wall of the original castle was found under the plaster of the current main mansion house building at Foulis.

== See also ==
- Castles in Scotland
