= David Lloyd =

David Lloyd may refer to:

== Entertainment ==
- David Lloyd (biographer) (1635–1692), author of Lloyd's Memoirs of Excellent Personages
- David Lloyd (tenor) (1912–1969), British tenor
- David Lloyd (writer) (1934–2009), American television writer
- David Lloyd (comics) (born 1950), illustrator of the graphic novel V for Vendetta
- David Lloyd (actor) (born 1955), English actor and screenwriter
- David Lloyd (broadcaster) (born 1961), British radio broadcaster
- David Lloyd (musician), singer with Uropa Lula
- David Lloyd (sportscaster), SportsCenter anchor for ESPN

== Sports ==
- David Lloyd (footballer, born 1872), for Thames Ironworks
- David Lloyd (footballer, born 1928) (1928–2000), for York City
- David Lloyd (riflemaker and sportsman) (1910–1996)
- David Lloyd (cricketer), (born 1947), known as "Bumble", England Test cricketer, coach, and commentator
- David Lloyd (cricketer, born 1992), Glamorgan cricketer
- Dave Lloyd (American football) (1936–2014), former National Football League player
- David Lloyd (tennis) (born 1948), founder of the David Lloyd Tennis Clubs
- Dave Lloyd (cyclist) (born 1949), and coach
- David Lloyd (squash player) (born 1965)

== Other ==
- David Lloyd (Dean of St Asaph) (1597–1663), Welsh cleric and author of The Legend of Captain Jones
- David Lloyd (Royal Navy officer) (died 1714?), British navy captain
- David Lloyd (priest) (c. 1688–1747?), Welsh cleric and translator
- David Lloyd (judge) (1656–1731), chief justice of colonial Pennsylvania
- David Lloyd (botanist) (1937–2006), New Zealand plant scientist and victim of poisoning scandal
- David Lloyd (diplomat) (born 1940), British ambassador to Slovenia
- David Lloyd (Welsh politician) (born 1956), Welsh politician
- David Lloyd (chemist) (born 1974), Irish chemist and Vice Chancellor of the University of South Australia
- David Lloyd (literary scholar), professor of English and political activist
- David Lloyd (police commissioner) (born 1963), British police commissioner
- David Lloyd Leisure, a franchise of gym and racquet clubs in UK and western Europe

== See also ==
- David Lloyd Jones (disambiguation)
- David Lloyd George (1863–1945), Prime Minister of the United Kingdom during World War I
- Gareth David-Lloyd (born 1981), actor who plays Ianto in the television series Torchwood
