= Brahan =

Brahan may refer to:

- Brahan Castle near Dingwall, Scotland
  - Siege of Brahan, November 1715
- Brahan Seer, 17th-century predictor of the future
