= 1747 in Great Britain =

Events from the year 1747 in Great Britain.

== Incumbents ==
- Monarch – George II
- Prime Minister – Henry Pelham (Whig)

== Events ==
- 31 January – the first venereal diseases clinic opens at London Lock Hospital.
- 9 April – Scottish Jacobite Simon Fraser, forfeited Lord Lovat, is beheaded by axe on Tower Hill in London for high treason, the last person to be executed in this way in Britain. Around twenty would-be spectators of the event are killed when a grandstand collapses.
- May – Heritable Jurisdictions (Scotland) Act 1746 breaks the power of the Scottish clans.
- 14 May – War of the Austrian Succession: First Battle of Cape Finisterre: British fleet is victorious against the French.
- June – Britain forms an alliance with Russia.
- 15 June – Indemnity Act ("Act of Grace") lifts further legal penalties from some participants in the Jacobite rising of 1745.
- 26 June–4 August – Snap general election reinforces Henry Pelham's position as Prime Minister.
- 2 July
  - War of the Austrian Succession: British forces led by the Duke of Cumberland defeated by Marshal Maurice de Saxe's French army at the Battle of Lauffeld near Maastricht in the Netherlands.
  - Benjamin Robins presents a paper to the Royal Society describing the physics of a spinning projectile following his investigation of rifle barrels.
- October – Thomas Herring is appointed Archbishop of Canterbury.
- 25 October – War of the Austrian Succession: Second Battle of Cape Finisterre: British fleet puts an end to French naval operations for the remainder of the war.
- 17–19 November – Knowles Riot in Boston, Massachusetts, against impressment to the British Royal Navy.

=== Undated ===
- James Lind undertakes one of the first controlled experiments in clinical medicine, on the effect of citrus fruit as a cure for scurvy.
- Liverpool becomes the busiest slave trading port in Britain, overtaking Bristol.

== Publications ==
- Hannah Glasse's cookbook The Art of Cookery Made Plain and Easy, "by A Lady".

== Births ==
- 15 January – John Aikin, doctor and writer (died 1822)
- 18 January – John Gillies, historian and classical scholar (died 1836)
- 26 January – Samuel Parr, schoolmaster (died 1825)
- 10 March – Iolo Morganwg (Edward Williams), Welsh antiquarian, poet and literary forger (died 1826)
- 6 July – John Paul Jones, Scottish-born sailor and the United States's first well-known naval fighter in the American Revolutionary War (died 1792)
- 12 December – Anna Seward, poet, "the Swan of Lichfield" (died 1809)
- Francis Salvador, London-born Sephardic Jew, plantation owner, the first Jew elected to public office in British America, and the first Jew to die in the cause of the United States (American Revolutionary War) (died 1776)
- Benjamin Vulliamy, clockmaker (died 1811)

== Deaths ==
- 8 February – Thomas Chubb, Deist (born 1679)
- 9 April – Simon Fraser, 11th Lord Lovat, Scottish clan chief (born c.1667)
- 9 May – John Dalrymple, 2nd Earl of Stair, Scottish soldier and diplomat (born 1673)
- 10 October – John Potter, Archbishop of Canterbury (born c.1674)
- 2 December – Vincent Bourne, English classical scholar (born 1695)

== See also ==
- 1747 in Wales
