= John Simon Frederick Fraser =

British politician

Lieutenant-Colonel John Simon Frederick Fraser (1765–1803), also referred to as Simon Fraser, the younger of Lovat, (Note: The younger of Lovat or Young Lovat distinguishes him from his more famous uncle: Lieutenant-General Simon Fraser of Lovat) commanded the Fraser Fencibles in Ireland and was Member of Parliament (M.P.) for Inverness-shire from 1796 to 1802.

== Biography ==
Simon Fraser was the eldest son of Archibald Fraser 20th MacShimidh (1736–1815) and Jane Fraser, daughter of William Fraser and sister to Sir William Fraser, 1st Baronet. He matriculated at Wadham College, Oxford on 4 July 1786 and entered Lincoln's Inn in 1789 and the Inner Temple in 1793.

He was Lieutenant-Colonel of the Fraser Fencibles, and saw service in Ireland during the Irish rebellion of 1798. This regiment was raised in 1794 by James Fraser of Balladrum (who had served in the 78th Fraser Highlanders under Lieutenant-General Simon Fraser). It disbanded in 1802.

Fraser was a Member of Parliament for Inverness-shire from 1796 to 1802, and died before his father, unmarried, in Lisbon on 6 April 1803. He had an illegitimate son.
