= Skirmish of Alness =

1715 battle

- Part of Jacobite rising of 1715
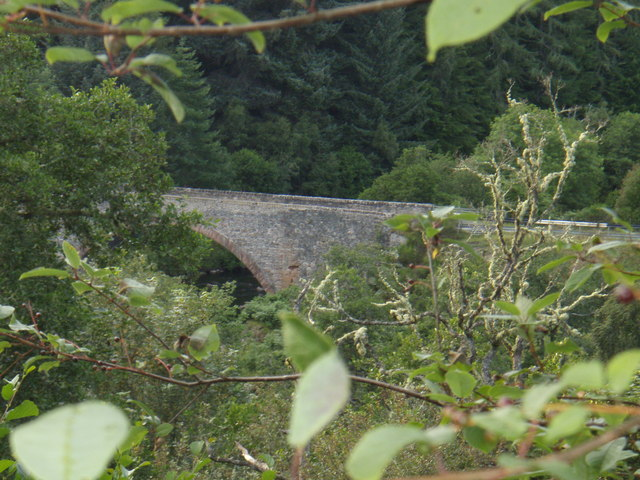
- The Bridge of Alness
Date	October 1715
Location	Alness, Scotland
Result	Jacobite victory, government troops retreated

Belligerents
(Kingdom of Great Britain) Great Britain: Clan Sutherland; Clan Mackay; Clan Ross; Clan Munro	Jacobites: Clan Mackenzie; Clan MacDonald of Sleat; Clan MacRae; Clan Mackinnon; Clan Chisholm

Commanders and leaders
Earl of Sutherland; Lord Reay; Baronet Munro; Munro of Newmore	Earl of Seaforth; Sir Donald MacDonald

Strength
1,800	3,000

Casualties and losses
1 killed	None

The Skirmish of Alness was a conflict that took place in October 1715 in Alness, in the county of Ross in the Scottish Highlands. It was part of the Jacobite rising of 1715 and pitted Highlanders loyal to the British-Hanoverian Government of George I of Great Britain against Highlanders loyal to the Jacobite House of Stuart.

== Background ==
William Mackenzie, 5th Earl of Seaforth, chief of Clan Mackenzie allied himself with John Erskine, 6th Earl of Mar who was the leader of the rebel Jacobite army. Mackenzie of Seaforth proceeded to Inverness and took over the town. Meanwhile, Sir Robert Munro, 6th Baronet, chief of the rival Clan Munro, who supported the British Government was secretly assembling his clansmen with the intention of taking Inverness. Mackenzie of Seaforth on hearing of this sent out messengers, one of whom met Munro on his march towards Dingwall. He gave Munro the message that "he should return home peacefully unless his intention was to throw his lot in with the Jacobites." Munro obliged and returned to his seat at Foulis Castle. The next day Mackenzie of Seaforth set off from Inverness with a large force, leaving his relative John Mackenzie of Coul in control of Inverness.

Great expectations were placed on John Gordon, 16th Earl of Sutherland, chief of Clan Sutherland, who like the Munros supported the government. Munro of Foulis had applied to both the Earl of Sutherland and Lord Reay for their support. The Earl of Sutherland gathered his forces and was joined by George Mackay, 3rd Lord Reay, chief of the Clan Mackay and a force from the Clan Ross who also supported the government. They arrived at Alness on 5 October and the Earl reviewed his forces and counted a force of 1800 men. They formed up in order of battle with the Mackays and the Rosses on the right, the Sutherlands in the centre and the Munros on the left. It is said that the Rosses were only armed with sharpened wooden poles as they had previously agreed to give up their weapons to the government. The Munros by contrast had six pieces of cannon, which according to Mackenzie of Seaforth, they had "boasted" that they would use to batter down his home at Brahan Castle.

== Conflict ==
Mackenzie of Seaforth on hearing of this gathering that opposed him was determined to disperse it. He had been joined by Sir Donald MacDonald, chief of the Clan MacDonald of Sleat, as well as a number of other clans and proceeded to Alness. Mackenzie’s force consisted of 3000 men. With this superior force he bore down upon the Earl of Sutherland's camp at Alness. According to one contemporary account, on hearing of the much larger force that opposed them the Earl of Sutherland and Lord Reay retreated to Bonar Bridge with 40 men leaving the rest to make their own way. Only one person died in this encounter. However, Munro of Foulis did not desert his men. The Munros who had also been left behind later marched back to Foulis Castle which had been garrisoned and fortified by Munro’s father (Sir Robert Munro, 5th Baronet, the blind baron). A force from the Clan Grant who were on their way to support the Earl of Sutherland's force turned back and did not arrive, even though they may have evened the numbers on each side.

== Council of war ==
A council of war was held between the leaders of the two sides in which the Earl of Sutherland and Lord Reay decided that due to their enemy's superior numbers it would not be wise to fight. However, Munro of Foulis and his cousin George Munro, 3rd of Newmore were up for fighting. Munro of Newmore apparently protested that although the enemy was superior in numbers that it was still their business to fight them because they might have a chance of beating them, and if not they would still be able to "scatter" them. In a letter from Thomas Robertson in Inverness, dated 30 January 1716, the writer says that Mackenzie of Seaforth demanded hostages to ensure that the Earl of Sutherland and Munro of Foulis would not trouble his lands while he was absent in the south. In the end the pro government clans marched off back to their homes.

== Aftermath ==
The Munros and Rosses returned home to find that their lands had been plundered. However, according to historian DM Rose, it is proved by contemporary evidence that Sir Robert Munro, 6th Baronet had greatly exaggerated the excesses that Mackenzie’s men had committed on his lands. According to Rose an account given by Munro’s cousin, Munro of Culcairn, is more to be relied on, in which he states: "a few men of disreputable character did damage wantonly, and their proceedings are said by Seaforth's enemies to have been countenanced by him". However, it was enough for Sir Robert Munro to gather his forces and retaliate in the Siege of Brahan where the Munros and Sutherlanders laid waste to Mackenzie’s lands at Brahan Castle. This followed the Siege of Inverness (1715) where Mackenzie of Coul had been holding out but was forced to retreat on 13 November and the main Jacobite army, which included Mackenzie of Seaforth was defeated at the Battle of Sheriffmuir on the same day.

== Gallery ==
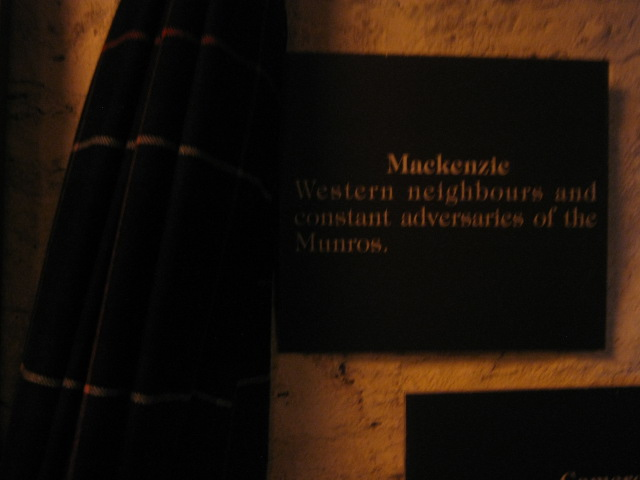
Clan Mackenzie tartan in the Clan Munro exhibition at the Storehouse of Foulis

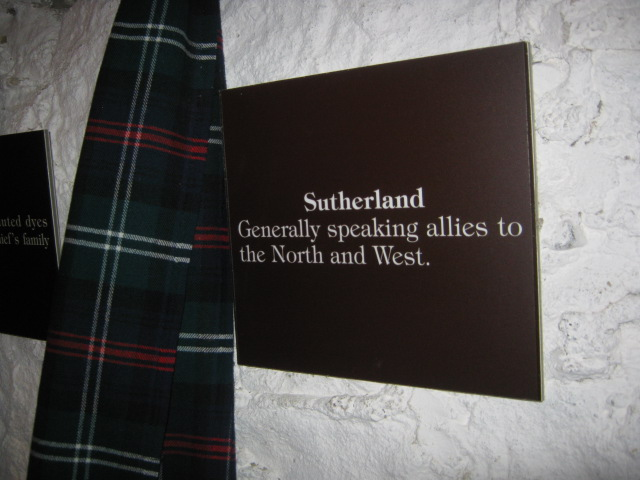
Clan Sutherland tartan in the Clan Munro exhibition at the Storehouse of Foulis

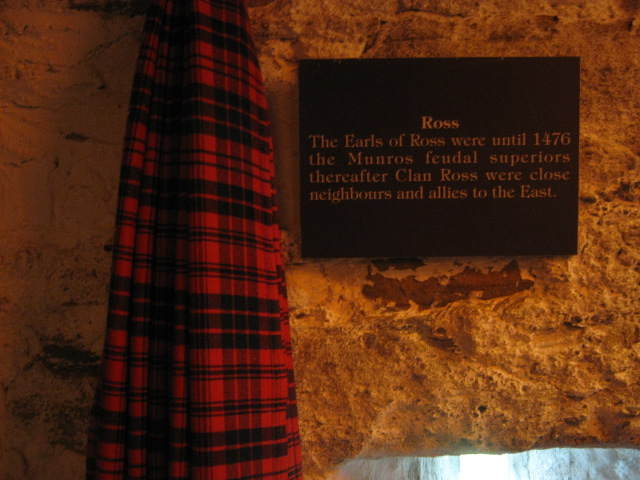
Clan Ross tartan in the Clan Munro exhibition at the Storehouse of Foulis
