= 1747 in Wales =

- Centuries: 16th; 17th; 18th; 19th; 20th
- Decades: 1720s; 1730s; 1740s; 1750s; 1760s
- See also: List of years in Wales; Timeline of Welsh history 1747 in Great Britain Scotland Elsewhere

Events from the year 1747 in Wales.

== Incumbents ==
- Lord Lieutenant of North Wales (Lord Lieutenant of Anglesey, Caernarvonshire, Denbighshire, Flintshire, Merionethshire, Montgomeryshire) – George Cholmondeley, 3rd Earl of Cholmondeley
- Lord Lieutenant of Glamorgan – Charles Powlett, 3rd Duke of Bolton
- Lord Lieutenant of Brecknockshire and Lord Lieutenant of Monmouthshire – Thomas Morgan
- Lord Lieutenant of Cardiganshire – Wilmot Vaughan, 3rd Viscount Lisburne
- Lord Lieutenant of Carmarthenshire – vacant until 1755
- Lord Lieutenant of Pembrokeshire – Sir Arthur Owen, 3rd Baronet
- Lord Lieutenant of Radnorshire – William Perry
- Bishop of Bangor – Matthew Hutton (until 10 December)
- Bishop of Llandaff – John Gilbert
- Bishop of St Asaph – Samuel Lisle
- Bishop of St Davids – The Hon. Richard Trevor

== Events ==
- August - In the general election, William Morgan of Tredegar Park becomes MP for Monmouthshire.
- date unknown
  - Construction of the Usk Bridge (Usk), designed by William Edwards, begins.
  - Portrait-painter William Williams relocates to Philadelphia.
  - A Quaker meeting house is established at Quakers Friars in Bristol, the burial place of Llywelyn ap Dafydd.
  - James Relly reports on his missionary tour to Bristol, Bath, Gloucestershire, and Birmingham.

== Arts and literature ==
=== New books ===
- John Boydell - The Bridge Book

=== Music ===
- William Williams Pantycelyn - Aleluia (hymns)

== Births ==
- January - Richard Fenton, poet and author (died 1821)
- 10 March - Iolo Morganwg (Edward Williams), antiquarian, poet and literary forger (died 1826)
- 5 April - Sir Thomas Hanmer, 2nd Baronet (2nd creation) (died 1828)
- 6 April - Moses Griffith, artist (died 1819)

== Deaths ==
- February - Walter Lloyd, lawyer and politician, 68
- 9 April - John Myddelton, landowner and politician, 61
- 21 July - Robert Clavering, former Bishop of Llandaff, 70/71
- probable - David Lloyd, clergyman and translator
