= Simon Fraser of Lovat =

Scottish general in the British Army

Major-General Simon Fraser of Lovat MP
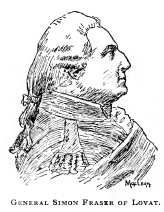

Member of the British House of Commons for Inverness-shire
- In office 1761 – 8 February 1782
- Preceded by: Pryse Campbell
- Succeeded by: Archibald Fraser

Personal details
- Born: 19 October 1726
- Died: 8 February 1782 (aged 55)
- Parent: Simon Fraser

Military service
- Allegiance: Great Britain
- Years of service: 1757–1762
- Battles/wars: Jacobite Rising of 1745; French and Indian War; Siege of Louisbourg; Battle of the Plains of Abraham

Simon Fraser of Lovat (19 October 1726 – 8 February 1782) was a Scottish military officer, lawyer, aristocrat, and politician. The son of a notorious Jacobite clan chief, he went on to serve with distinction in the British Army. He also raised forces which served in the Seven Years' War against the French in Quebec, as well as the American Revolutionary War. Simon was the 19th Chief of the Clan Fraser of Lovat.

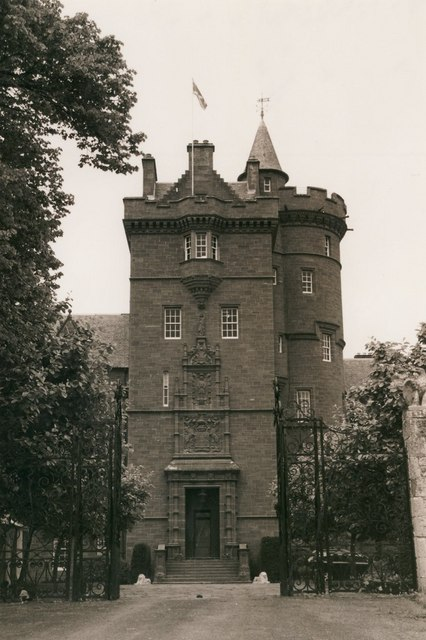
Castle Dounie

== Master of Lovat ==
Simon's father was Simon "the Fox" Fraser, Lord Lovat, chief of the Clan Fraser. His mother, Margaret Grant (died 1729), was a daughter of Ludovick Grant, chief of the Clan Grant. As his father's eldest son, he was heir and hence the Master of Lovat. He grew up in the ancestral home of Castle Dounie, also known as Castle Beaufort, near Beauly, and was educated in Edinburgh and at the University of St Andrews.

== The '45 ==
Simon 'would not have had any concern in this rebellion, had he been entirely left to himself', according to one of his father's secretaries of the period. This was confirmed by another, who noted that his father was a 'very strict man' with great power over his children. So, at his father's bidding, Simon led his clansmen out in favour of Charles Edward Stuart in December 1745.

He was not present at the Battle of Culloden. Instead, Charles Fraser of Inverallochy commanded about 300 Frasers, who were in the front of the Jacobite lines and reached the British front line after a short charge. However, confronted with a second line of Hanoverian troops, their impetus was lost and they retreated in some disorder, leaving many dead and wounded behind.

There are various stories about the Master of Lovat at this moment in history. One traditional story is that, as the first of the Jacobites fleeing from Culloden approached Inverness, they were met by a battalion of Frasers led by the Master of Lovat. He immediately about-turned his men and marched down the road back towards Inverness, with pipes playing and colours. A second story is that he intended to hold the bridge which spans the river Ness until he was persuaded against it. In a third account, recounted in The Last Highlander by Sarah Fraser, he intended to continue on to the fight at Culloden moor but was scolded at the bridge by another Jacobite by the name of Evan Baillie: 'Fighting, by God, Master! You were not in the way when fighting might have been of service. You had best say nothing of it now'.

List of men in Simon Fraser, Master of Lovat's Jacobite regiment

Colonel: Simon Fraser, Master of Lovat, Castle Downie, Kilmorak, Inverness, Advocate.
Lieutenant Colonels: James Fraser of Foyers, Boleskine, Inverness. Charles Fraser, Ygr. of Inverallochy.
Majors: Alexander Fraser of Fairfield.
Captains: Alexander Fraser, Inchnacardoch, Alexander Fraser, Rilich, Kirkhills, Inverness. Hugh Fraser, Dorburn, Borlum, Farmer. Hugh Fraser. Simon Fraser, Delehapple, Farmer. William Fraser, Fort Augustus, Merchant. Simon Fraser of Auchnacloich, Auchnaclouch, Kiltarlity, Inverness, Tacksman. Alexander Fraser of Balchreggan Balcreggan, Kirkhill, Inverness. John Fraser of Bryefield. William Fraser of Culmiln, Culmiln, Kirkhill, Inverness. William Fraser of Delernig, Stratherick. William Fraser, Ygr. of Culbockie, Culbockie, Kiltarlaty, Inverness. Rory MacDonald of Tray (Traigh?).
Ensigns: Alexander Fraser, Letelune, Taxman & Farmer. Alexander MacIver Wellhouse, Kilmorack. Inverness, Sergeant, Tenant in Wellhouse.
Officers: Alexander Fraser, Stratherrick, Hugh Fraser, Birnehen, Boleskine, Inverness. Hugh Fraser, Hugh Fraser, Green of Muirton, Inverness, Wright. John MacGilespech Fraser. John Fraser, Birnchen, Stratherrick, Taxman. John Fraser, Moydie, Kilmorack, Inverness. John Fraser, Teawigg, Kilmorach. Simon Fraser, Stratherrick, Inverness, Vintner. John Fraser of Bruaich. Thomas Fraser of Gortuleg. Hugh Fraser of Ledclune. Hugh Fraser of Littlegarth. John Dow Fraser of Littlegarth. John Fraser, Ygr. of Bochruben Castle Downie Tenant of Bochruben. Alexander MacTavish. John MacTavish of Gartenbegg.
Volunteers: Thomas Houston, Deynample, (Drummyample), Boleskine, Inverness, Adjutant Farmer, Paymaster.
Sergeants: David Fraser, Servant to Master of Lovat. John Fraser, Wellhouse, Kilmorack, Inverness, Tenant. Donald MacLennan.
Pipers: William Fraser, Wester Downy, Kiltarlaty, Inverness, Piper to Lord Lovat. David Fraser, Piper to Lord Lovat.
Rank not known: Donald Campbell. Alexander Doan. Abanini Donald. Evan MacAichen. John MacAichen. Alister MacDonald. Donald MacDonald. Andrew MacEneas. Malcolm MacEneas. Duncan MacGilles. John MacGilles. William MacGilles. Donald MacGilles. Duncan MacGillies. Ranald MacHanvichan. Angus MacKinnon. John MacKinnon. John MacLannan. Archibald MacLennan. Donald MacLennan. Angus MacSweene, Isle of Skye, Farmer in Roache, Isle of Skye. Thomas Michael.
Private men:
- John Calder, Miltoun of Redcastle, Kilernon, Ross.
- Ewan Cameron, Ross Husbandry in Hillhouses.
- John Cameron, Algas or Aigas, Ross, Weaver.
- Allan Cameron, Glendobeg.
- Donald Cameron, Muirlaggan.
- Donald Cameron Kilmorak, Inverness.
- Donald Cameron Teahrowat, Kilmorach, Inverness.
- Murdoch Cameron, Inverness-shire.
- Angus Campbell, Inverness.
- Alexander Duncan, Inverness-shire.
- Alexander Forbes, Beauly, Weaver.
- William Fraser, Aird, Inverness-shire, Husbandry in Kirktown.
- Thomas Fraser, Inverness-shire.
- Alexander Fraser, Inverness, Weaver at Monique.
- David Fraser, Balagelken, Urquhart.
- Donald Fraser, Inverness, Husbandman, Fort Augustus.
- Hugh Fraser, Inverness Tailor, at Colwoolen.
- Hugh Fraser, Inverness, Husbandman, Drimhardinich.
- Hugh Fraser, Inverness, Husbandman, Imirmurie.
- James Fraser, Inverness, Labourer.
- John Fraser, Inverness, Farmer at Craigscory.
- John Fraser, Ross, Farmer at Crochill.
- John Fraser, Edinburgh, Servant to Mr Mitchell, Writer, Edinburgh.
- John Fraser, Inverness, Weaver.
- Peter Fraser, Inverness-shire.
- Simon Fraser, Inverness.
- William Fraser, Kirktoun, Aird, Farmer.
- Alexander Fraser, Clunie, Aberdeen Servant, Castle Fraser.
- Alexander Fraser, Farralone.
- Alexander Fraser, Glendomore.
- Alexander Fraser, Limaire, Kilmorack.
- Alexander Fraser, Migavie (Mingarie?).
- Andrew Fraser, Glendomore.
- Donald Fraser, Borlum.
- Donald Fraser, Daleragg.
- Donald Fraser, Gartbegg.
- Donald Fraser, Glendomore.
- Hugh Fraser, Ardochie.
- Hugh Fraser, Knockie.
- James Fraser, Knockie.
- John Fraser, Ardochie.
- John Fraser, Inverness, Farmer at Belladrum.
- John Fraser, Bewly (Beauly), Kilmorack, Inverness.
- John Fraser, Dalchapple.
- John Fraser, Daleragg.
- John Fraser, Englishtoun, Farmer.
- John Fraser, Englishtoun Cottar.
- John Fraser, Glenobeg.
- John Fraser, Knockie.
- John Fraser, Muirlaggan.
- John Fraser, Teanaird.
- Patrick Fraser, Inverness, Husbandry in Drumlardinich.
- Roderick Fraser, Linarie, Kilmorack, Inverness, Tenant in Limaire.
- Simon Fraser, Beauly, Kilmorack, Inverness.
- Thomas Fraser, Ardochie.
- Thomas Fraser, Englishtoun, Smith.
- Thomas Fraser, Glendo.
- Thomas Fraser, Inverness-shire.
- William Fraser, Ailndych.
- William Fraser, Ardochie.
- William Fraser, Drummond, Stratherrick.
- William Fraser, Glendomore.
- Donald Fraser, Balagalken, Logie & Urquhart, Nairn.
- James Fraser, Jr. Balagalken, Urquhart, Nairn.
- Peter Gow, Garder, Beauly, kilmorak, Inverness.
- John Grasick, Inverness-shire.
- Alexander M’Dougal, Paleness, Inverness.
- Neil MacAulay, North Uist, Itinerant Taylor.
- Hugh MacBain, Beauly, Kilmorack, Inverness.
- Alexander MacCowl, Kilmuire.
- Donald MacDonald, Inverness-shire.
- Duncan MacDonald, Servant to brother of Fraser of Culduthel.
- Sween MacDonald, Inverness, Beggar.
- Donald MacGilivary, Aberchalder.
- Neil MacGoary, Inverness-shire.
- John MacHutcheon, Inverness, Herd to Lord Lovat.
- William MacIntosh, Inverness-shire.
- Jacsol MacKay, Inverness-shire.
- Evan MacKay, Glendobeg.
- William MacKenzie, Inverness-shire.
- Evan MacKenzie, Inverness-shire.
- Alexander MacKenzie, Inverness, Husbandry in Drumhardinich.
- Donald MacKenzie, Inverness-shire.
- Colin MacKenzie Chapleton, Kilernan, Ross, Tenant in Chapletoun of Redcastle.
- Murdo MacKenzie, Aberchalder.
- Roderick MacLean, Bridgehouse, Kilmorack, Inverness.
- Donald MacLeod, Ross, Farmer at Crosshill, Ross.
- Daniel MacLeod, Inverness.
- Farquhar MacNully, Beauly, Kilmorack, Inverness.
- James MacPherson, Inverness-shire.
- John MacRitchie, Herd to Lord Lovat.
- Alexander MacTavish, Gartbegg.
- Alexander MacTavish, Megavie.
- Donald MacTavish, Aberchalder.
- Donald MacTavish, Megavie.
- Dougal MacTavish, Soullenegary.
- Farquhar MacTavish, Easter Aberchalder.
- Hugue MacTavish, Gartbegg.
- John MacTavish, Gartbegg.
- John MacTavish, Megavie.
- Tarvis MacTavish, Aberchalder.
- Tavish MacTavish, Gartenbegg.
- Tavis MacTavish, Megavie.
- Alexander MacTavish, Aberchalder.
- John MacWilliam, Kilmorack, Inverness.
- Thomas MacWilliam, Platchaick, Kilmorack, Inverness.
- Neil McGoary, Inverness-shire.
- Andrew Mouchall, Inverness-shire.
- Donald Noble, Knockie.
- Murdoch Paterson, Lettoch of Redcastle, Kilmuir, Ross.
- Donald Paterson, Jr. Easter Kessock of Redcastle, Kilmuir, Ross.
- Donald Paterson, Sen. Easter Kessock of Redcastle, Kilmuir, Ross.
- John Riddel, Inverness-shire, Groom to Lord Lovat.
- Lachlan Ritchie, Inverness-shire.
- Donald Ross, Inverness-shire.
- Thomas Taylor, Bridgehouse, Kilmorack, Inverness.

== Rehabilitation and legal career ==
Following the Battle of Culloden, after several weeks on the run, Simon surrendered to the Crown and was imprisoned in Edinburgh Castle from November 1746 to August 1747. He then remained in Glasgow ‘at the king’s pleasure’ where he studied law at Glasgow University.

Simon received a full pardon in 1750, the same year he was called to the Scottish bar. He burnished his establishment credentials by acting in 1752 as a counsel for the widow of Colin Roy Campbell against James Stewart in a notorious case known as the Appin Murder. Stewart was a member of the local Jacobite clan the Stewarts of Appin, who had recently suffered evictions on Campbell's orders. Stewart was found guilty of aiding and abetting by a jury composed largely of Campbells (the presiding judge was the Campbell chief) and was hanged.

In 1753, he offered himself as a candidate for the forthcoming general election for Inverness-shire (which had a total of about 26 electors) but the Archibald Campbell, worried this might reignite feelings of clanship, persuaded Fraser not to stand.

== Military service ==
Britain’s war with France in North America raised problems of recruitment, and more in ‘desperation’ than inspiration, the government decided to recruit soldiers from the Highlands. Simon, whose hereditary title had been attainted following the Forty-Five, raised 800 men from the forfeited estate of his own family within a few weeks. He was commissioned as a lieutenant-colonel, and the regiment, originally called the 78th Regiment of Foot, was soon renamed the Fraser Highlanders.

The uniform of the regiment was the full Highland dress, with musket and broadsword... and a sporran of badger's or otter's skin. An eagle's or hawk's feather was worn in their bonnets by the officers, while the soldiers ornamented theirs with a bunch of the distinguishing mark of the clan or district to which they severally belonged.

The regiment were sent to North America in 1757, and wintered in Halifax, Nova Scotia. Here, Fraser fended off an attempt by his superiors to make the soldiers wear clothing thought more appropriate for the severe winters and hot summers of the continent. Their unique national dress even enhanced their fighting qualities, with one officer noting that alongside their bravery and their agility, 'their dress contribute to adapt them to this climate, and render them formidable'.

They fought with distinction against the French at the siege of Louisbourg in 1758 (under the command of General Wolfe), at the Battle of the Plains of Abraham in 1759, and at the capture of Montreal a year later.

In 1762, Fraser left his regiment to serve in Portugal, where he reached the temporary rank of major-general in command of Portuguese forces against the Spanish. The following year his regiment was disbanded whilst still in Canada and he was put on half-pay.

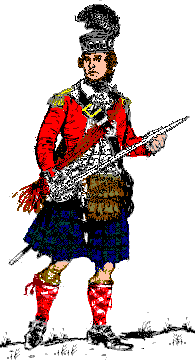
Officer of the 71st Regiment of Foot.

At the outbreak of the American War of Independence in 1775, General Fraser raised another regiment of two battalions, known as the 71st Regiment of Foot (informally known as the Fraser Highlanders), although he did not accompany them to North America.

== Later life ==
In April 1761, the Duke of Argyll (who had opposed Fraser's standing for election) died. The next month, Fraser was elected unopposed to the House of Commons seat of Inverness-shire, one day after his return from North America. He was re-elected three times, and remained a representative until his death. This is despite often being absent from the seat. A history of the House of Commons for this period notes 'a brief visit' in 1766, as well as his absence in Portugal in 1768. Indeed, he may have been the British Ambassador there in this period, since another source states he was representing the British Government in Lisbon in 1770.

In 1774, the Lovat estates were restored to him (but not the title). This was a full decade before other forfeited estates were restored, and was a measure of Fraser's service for the Crown. He nevertheless felt proud of his Scottish identity. In 1778, he was the founding member and first president of the Highland Society of London. Its overall aim was to 'promote the Interests of the Highlands', with its particular goals being to repeal the ban on Highland dress being worn, the promotion of the Scottish Gaelic language, music and literature, establishing schools, agricultural improvement, the relief of distressed Highlanders, and 'keeping up the Martial Spirit; and rewarding the gallant achievements of the Highland Corps'. His half brother Archibald joined the Society in the same year.

Fraser married Catherine Bristow, but they had no children together. He died in London in 1782 at the age of 56. His later life was marked by social respectability, albeit with some debt to his name. His half-brother, Archibald Campbell Fraser of Lovat, succeeded him as the 20th MacShimidh, or Chief of Clan Fraser.

== Fraser in fiction ==
Simon Fraser appears twice in fiction, but each time in an unflattering light. He is a character in the novel Catriona written in 1893 by Robert Louis Stevenson. (Events and characters in the novel relate to the Appin Murder). He and his father, Simon "The Old Fox", appear as characters in Diana Gabaldon's 1992 novel Dragonfly in Amber, the second novel in her Outlander series. In it, "The Old Fox" is the grandsire of Jamie Fraser and Lovat is his half-uncle, an indecisive young man, easily manipulated. Lovat is played by James Parris in season 2 of the television series Outlander.

== Fraser's depiction ==
The image of Fraser above may actually be of his half-brother, Archibald. This is discussed at length on Archibald's Wikipedia page.

== See also ==
- "Lord Lovat's Lament"

== Bibliography ==
- Duffy, Christopher (2003) The '45. Bonnie Prince Charlie and the Untold Story of the Jacobite Rising. Orion Books Ltd. ISBN 978-0-7538-2262-3
- Fraser, Marie (2005) 'The Old 78th Regiment of Foot', article on Clan Fraser of Canada society website. https://web.archive.org/web/20061021041126/http://clanfraser.ca/78th.htm Accessed 6/3/16.
- Fraser, Sarah (2012) The Last Highlander. Scotland's Most Notorious Clan Chief, Rebel and Double Agent. Harper Press, London. ISBN 978-0-00-722949-9
- Lenman, Bruce (1984) The Jacobite Clans of the Great Glen 1650-1784. Scottish Cultural Press, Dalkeith. ISBN 1 898218 19 6
- Mackenzie, Alexander (1896) History of the Frasers of Lovat, with genealogies of the principal families of the name: to which is added those of Dunballoch and Phopachy. A&W Mackenzie, Inverness.
- Macpherson, Alan Gibson (1996) A Day’s March to Ruin. The Badenoch men in the ‘forty-five and Col. Ewen Macpherson of Cluny. Clan MacPherson Association, Newtonmore. ISBN 0952858703 (pbk)
- Namier, Lewis & Brooke, John (1964, republished 1985) The House of Commons 1754-1790. Seeker & Warburg, London.
- Sinclair, John (1813) An Account of the Highland Society of London, from its establishment in May 1773, to the commencement of the year 1813. B. McMillan, London.

Honorary titles
Preceded by Simon Fraser	MacShimidh; 1747–1782	Succeeded by Archibald Campbell Fraser
Parliament of Great Britain
Preceded by Pryse Campbell	Member of Parliament for Inverness-shire; 1761 – 8 February 1782	Succeeded by Archibald Campbell Fraser
