= Simon Fraser, 11th Lord Lovat =

Scottish Jacobite and clan head (1667–1747)

Simon Fraser
- 11th Lord Lovat
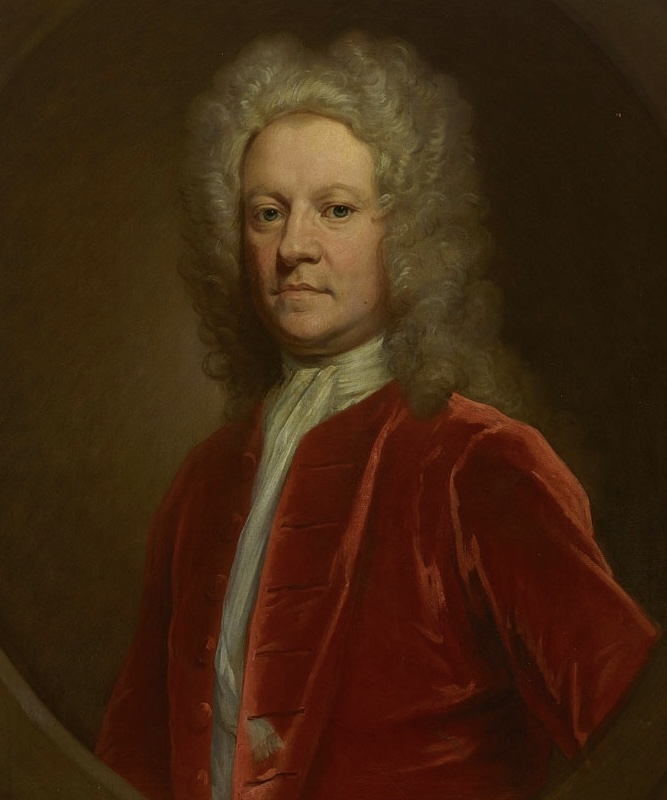
- Portrait by Godfrey Kneller
- Tenure: 1699–1746
- Predecessor: Thomas Fraser, 10th Lord Lovat
- Successor: Thomas Fraser, 12th Lord Lovat
- Other titles: Duke of Fraser; Marquis of Beaufort; Earl of Stratherrick; Viscount of the Aird and Strathglass
- Born: 5 January 1667
- Died: 9 April 1747 (aged 80); Tower Hill, London, England
- Cause of death: Decapitation
- Spouses: Amelia Murray (disputed); Margaret Grant (died 1726); Primrose Campbell (1710–1796)
- Issue: Simon Fraser of Lovat; Archibald Campbell Fraser of Lovat; Alexander; Janet; Sybilla
- Parents: Thomas Fraser, 10th Lord Lovat; Sybilla Macleod (died 1682)

Simon Fraser, 11th Lord Lovat, (c. 1667 – 9 April 1747) (Note: Also known as the Fox (Scottish Gaelic: an t-Sionnach)) was a Scottish landowner and head of Clan Fraser of Lovat. Convicted of high treason for his role in the Jacobite rising of 1745, he was the last man in Britain to be executed by beheading.

Fraser's family had been associated with the Jacobite cause during the late 17th century: hoping to gain support in a dispute over ownership of the Fraser lands, he remained in contact with the exiled Stuart court. During the Jacobite rising of 1715, Fraser supported the government and was accordingly granted ownership of the confiscated Lovat estate; by the late 1730s, however, he was again secretly in contact with the exiles. During the Jacobite rising of 1745, he first gave assurances of his loyalty to both sides, but ultimately supplied Fraser levies to the Jacobite Army.

While in hiding from government troops in Lochaber following the Battle of Culloden, he was captured near Loch Morar by the Royal Navy. Brought to London, Lovat was tried for treason by his peers in the House of Lords, found guilty, sentenced to death, and executed on Tower Hill on 9 April 1747. Lord Lovat was both praised by Alasdair Mac Mhaighstir Alasdair and had his future execution accurately predicted by Maighstir Iain Mac Fhearchair in the Scottish Gaelic bardic poetry of the era. Lord Lovat has also appeared in multiple works of historical fiction published since, including novels by John Buchan, Neil Munro, S.G. Maclean and Diana Gabaldon.

== Early life ==
Fraser arms

Simon was the second son of Thomas Fraser of Beaufort (1631–1699) and Lady Sybilla MacLeod (d. 1682), daughter of John Mór MacLeod, 16th Chief of Clan MacLeod. The Beaufort Frasers were Lord Lovat, hereditary chiefs of the highland Clan Fraser. Simon was tutored privately at his home near Beauly. He was a capable student, becoming fluent in English, French and Gaelic, as well as gaining a solid grounding in Latin.

Simon's older brother, Alexander, died from wounds received fighting for the Jacobites at the victorious Battle of Killiecrankie. Simon, now his father's heir, left home to study at King's College, Aberdeen, where he was a "diligent student" and graduated with a Master of Arts degree in 1695.

At this point Simon was at a crossroads, owing to the poor leadership of the clan by Hugh Fraser, 9th Lord Lovat (1666–1696). Recognising the threat posed to it by the expanding power of the nearby Clan Mackenzie, as well as its ally the Atholl Murrays, Simon of Beaufort needed to ensure his father's succession to the lordship. There were two avenues available to him to pursue this claim: the law or the army. He chose the latter. Accordingly, he went to Edinburgh and undertook to recruit three hundred men from his clan to form part of a regiment in the service of William III and Mary II. This was done more to ensure a body of well-trained soldiers under his influence than loyalty to the government. However, a suspicious Lord John Murray (brother of Hugh Fraser's wife, Amelia Murray) was colonel of Simon's regiment and he was only given a lieutenancy, not a salaried captainship.

In early 1696, whilst on a trip to London in the company of both Simon of Beaufort and Lord John Murray, Hugh assigned the succession of the Lovat title to the Beaufort Frasers. Hugh died that same year, and Thomas of Beaufort (Simon's father) then took on the title of 10th Lord Lovat, but the succession was to be disputed by Lord John Murray, now the Earl of Tullibardine and the most powerful man in Scotland.

== Open violence ==
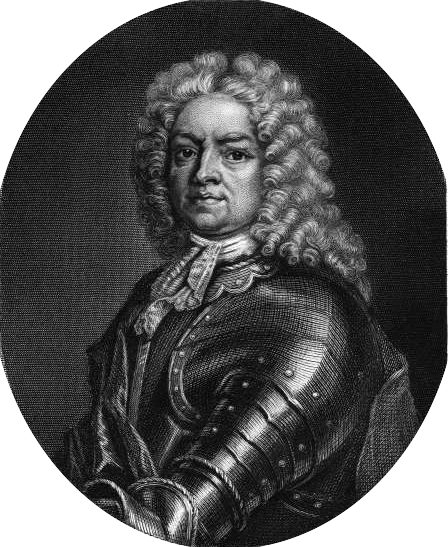
Simon Fraser, Lord Lovat

After a fierce verbal encounter in Edinburgh, when Tullibardine attempted to make Simon renounce his claim to the lordship, Simon went to Castle Dounie to negotiate with Hugh's widow Amelia for the hand of her young daughter (also called Amelia). Tullibardine responded by removing his niece to Blair Castle, stronghold of the Murrays. It was his intention that she marry Alexander Fraser of Philorth, heir to Lord Saltoun, and who was unrelated to the Frasers of the Gàidhealtachd.

Simon responded to this by kidnapping the young Master of Saltoun when he arrived in Fraser territory in an attempt win local support for the marriage. By having a gallows built outside the window of his prison and threatening to hang him, Simon successfully dissuaded Alexander from marrying the heiress. Although this incident was characteristic of a private clan feud, Tullibardine had no intention of letting the matter rest. He declared the Frasers had risen in open rebellion against the Crown, and harried the colonel in charge of the government barracks at Fort William to proceed against Fraser.

Before the Crown could respond, however, Simon undertook an act in October 1697 which was to have dire consequences for both himself and others. "If he could not have Amelia the daughter, he would have Amelia the mother". Whilst at Castle Dounie he had an Episcopal minister brought in to marry them. Her family, the most powerful in Scotland, was naturally enraged by this act of violence. He later treated it as a practical joke without legal validity; they separated in December 1697 and he married twice more before Amelia's death on 6 May 1743, without seeking divorce.

Once Simon allowed his wife to rejoin her family at Blair Castle, the Privy Council and Court of Session issued "Letters of Intercommuning", preventing people from "communing" with Simon, his father and any of his followers. Moreover, they could be brought in "dead or alive". A military expedition of both Atholl Murray men and government troops was sent to Fraser country in February 1698 to achieve this, but they failed to capture him. Simon and his father made good their escape to the highlands, and the troops could do little but destroy Fraser property.

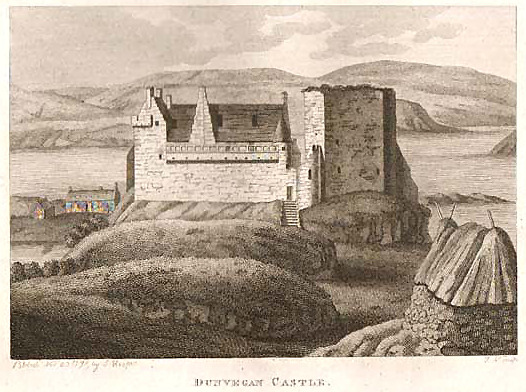
Dunvegan Castle circa 1790

They were eventually cited to answer two charges: forced marriage and rape, as well as raising men in arms. In September 1698 – and still notable for their absence – Simon, his father, and twenty leading men of the clan, were convicted of the capital crime of rebellion. Eventually Simon and his father took refuge at Dunvegan Castle on Skye. This was the ancestral home to the McLeods, his mother's family. It was here in May 1699 that the 69 year old Thomas died, still with a price on his head. Simon now assumed the title of Lord Lovat, but he was an outlaw and unable to claim his estates. Simon was obliged to bury his father at Dunvegan rather than the traditional burial place of Lovat Frasers, at Wardlaw, near Beauly. (Eventually, on securing the title, he erected a notably extravagant memorial stone at Wardlaw Mausoleum.)

Despite these tribulations, Fraser still commanded the loyalty of his clan, not least because of the Atholl Murrays' "systematic attempt to ravage the properties of those Fraser gentlemen well disposed to Simon's cause". After his return from Skye, Simon Fraser commanded about 300 armed followers and successfully ambushed some 600 Athollmen and government soldiers near Inverness. Simon was dissuaded from massacring them, but two of Tullibardine's brothers were forced to kiss the tip of his sword. The enemy troop were then made to run the gauntlet. In this, Simon showed he was capable of fulfilling an important role of a highland chief, that of military leader.

== Royal pardon ==
Simon was facing nearly impossible odds in his attempts to gain control of the Fraser lands, and the law offered him no opportunity for recourse. Both Tullibardine and his ally, George Mackenzie, Viscount of Tarbat, had a firm control of the Edinburgh judiciary. However, he found a powerful ally in Archibald Campbell, tenth Earl (and after 1701, first Duke) of Argyll and chief of the powerful Clan Campbell. Argyll advised Simon to go to London and seek a pardon from King William, whilst informing William in a letter of the "chaos and hostility" caused by Tullibardine in his pursuit of Simon. Other powerful voices were to support Argyll's opinion, and ultimately this was to sway the King, now concerned to keep the peace in Scotland whilst he fought a war in Flanders. Granted a pardon in 1700, Simon was at last free to assume the title of Lord Lovat in the ancestral residence at Castle Dounie. Argyll was himself elevated to a Dukedom, and his rise seemed to presage Tullibardine's fall as well as Simon's advancement.

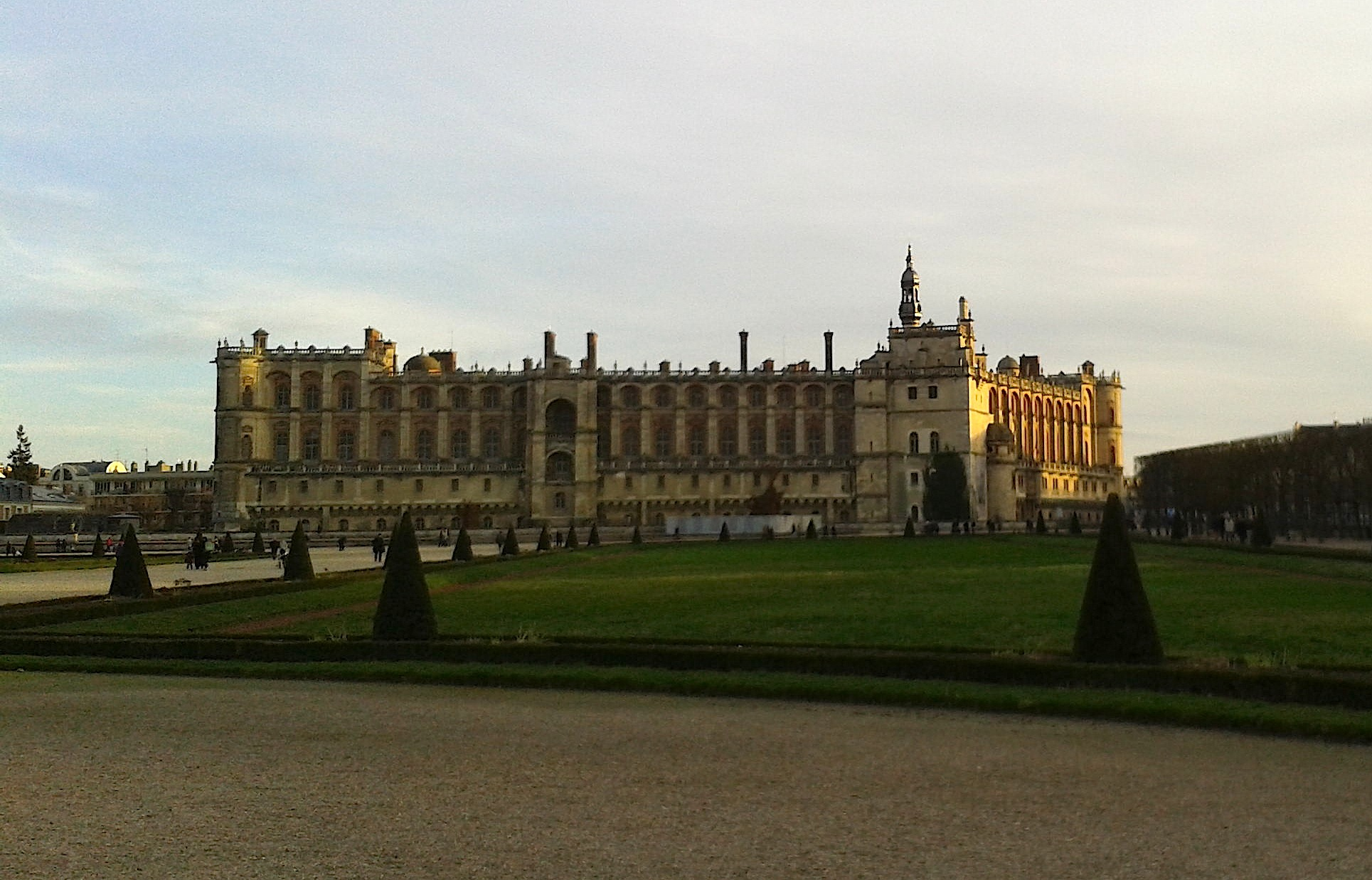
Chateau St Germain en Laye

This improvement in Simon's fortunes was not to last. The business of the forced marriage and rape was unresolved (it being a matter concerning private individuals, not the Crown), and the Murrays did not relent on this charge. When he failed to appear in court in February 1701 to answer the charge of "rapt and hamesucken", he was again outlawed. This was followed up a year later by more "letters of intercommuning" (known more dramatically as a "Commission of Fire and Sword"). In March 1702 William III died, and Queen Anne succeeded to the throne. She favoured Tullibardine, rather than Argyll.

A final blow was received in mid-1702 when Amelia, the 13-year-old daughter of Hugh, the 9th Lord Lovat, married Alexander Mackenzie, who took the name 'Alexander Mackenzie of Fraserdale'. This supposedly made him a Fraser, and by the terms of Hugh's marriage contract of 1685, his first born son would inherit the title and estates of Lovat. The Mackenzie takeover of Fraser lands was very close to fruition. The newly married couple moved into Castle Dounie while Simon was in London, seeking to meet the new Queen. On Argyll's advice, Lovat left Britain and headed to a place that might offer a solution to the ongoing issue of his inheritance: the court of the exiled Stuarts, at St Germain-en-Laye in France.

== At the court of exiles ==
After 15 years of exile, the family of James II was still hoping to regain the thrones of England and Scotland. The elder James had died a few months before Simon's arrival, but his 14-year-old son James stood ready. However, the court-in-exile was divided into two factions. One, headed by the Earl of Middleton ("good tempered, affable and patient") favoured a peaceful accession by young James to the throne of England on the death of Anne. The other faction was headed by the Duke of Perth ("proud and passionate") which saw an armed rising in Scotland, assisted materially by France, as the most likely way to restore the family to its former glory. Simon gravitated towards the Duke of Perth's faction, not least because Simon's cousin, John McLean, already belonged to it.

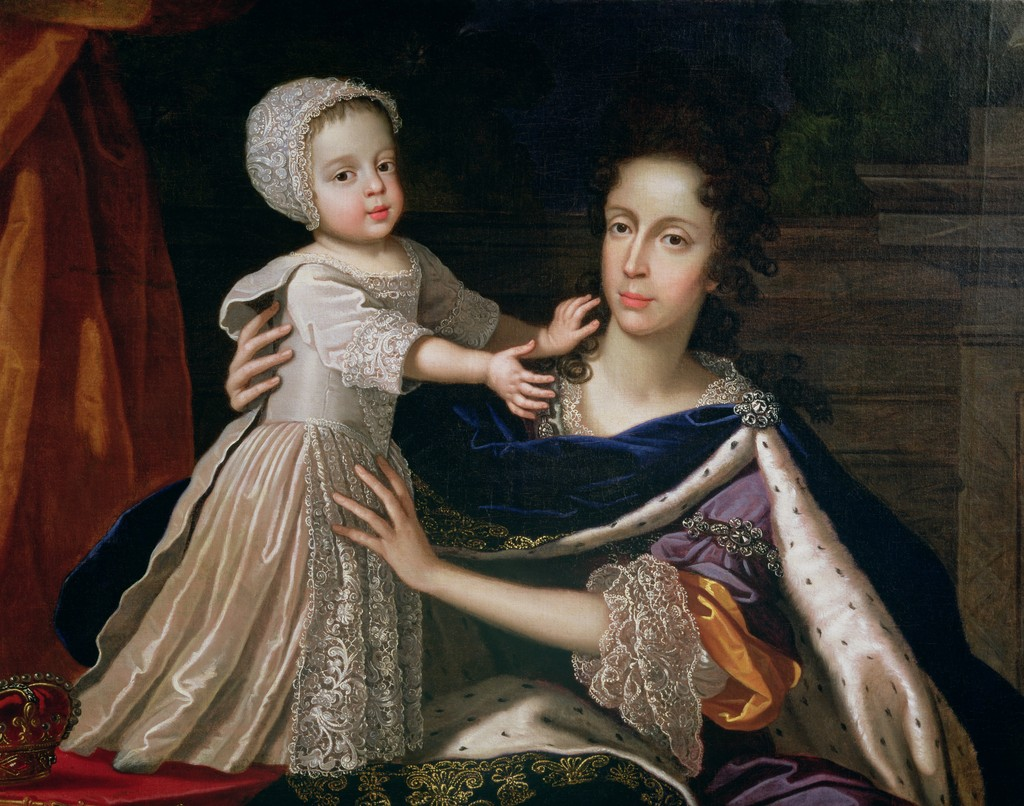
Mary of Modena with her son James

One major step Fraser took to advance his cause was to convert to Catholicism. The court was ostentatiously Catholic, with James' mother Mary of Modena setting the standard for piety, and Middleton had himself recently converted. Once a Catholic, Simon was also able to secure a private audience with the King of France, Louis XIV, at Versailles. Here, speaking in "good French with a Scots accent", he put forward a plan for a rising by the Jacobite clans of the highlands, aided by French troops, arms and money. Later, he added flesh to these plans. About five thousand French troops would land on the east coast of Scotland, at Dundee. At the same time, five hundred men were to land on the west coast and seize Fort William or Inverlochy. Together, they would march towards Edinburgh, gathering men from the clans as they progressed. The involvement of the highlanders was "the main and the novel feature" of Simon's plan. It has also been suggested by later writers that this plan would form the basis of both major Jacobite uprisings, in 1715 and 1745.

Although the Jacobite ruling council ultimately agreed to the plan, Middleton was cautious and recommended to Louis that Fraser be sent back to Scotland to obtain written proof that the highland clans would rise if French troops landed. So, after a year in France, Simon returned to Scotland in mid-1703 to lay the groundwork for an invasion and uprising which could allow him to reclaim his title and estates.

== Double dealings ==
In 1703, Fraser returned to Britain with a handful of blank commissions signed by James Francis Edward, escorted by Lord John Murray, soon to be Duke of Atholl. He first visited London, then Scotland, where he learned that while economic hardships caused considerable discontent with Queen Anne's government, the Highland chiefs were unenthusiastic about another rising. In September, he met Anne's representative in the Scottish parliament, James Douglas, Duke of Queensberry and shared details of the French invasion plans. He also showed him a letter from Mary of Modena, addressed to an 'L. J. M.' which he suggested was Lord John Murray; these initials were probably added by Fraser himself.

Fraser's goal was to regain the Lovat title and estates; while his brother John tried to keep his clansmen loyal and collected rents in his absence, there were signs they were beginning to accept a Mackenzie in his place. Later evidence suggests his betrayal of the Stuart cause was an attempt to implicate his political enemies Atholl and Queensbury in a Jacobite plot. In the absence of a successful rising, this would ensure his political rehabilitation by ingratiating himself with the existing government.

As the main Scottish sponsor of Union, Queensberry was happy to implicate the anti-Union Atholl and passed this onto London and provided Fraser a passport under a false name allowing him to leave the country. With rumours already circulating about Fraser's return and calls being made for his capture, Queensbury provided him with a passport in a false name and he was obliged to return to France to explain himself.

== Imprisonment in France ==
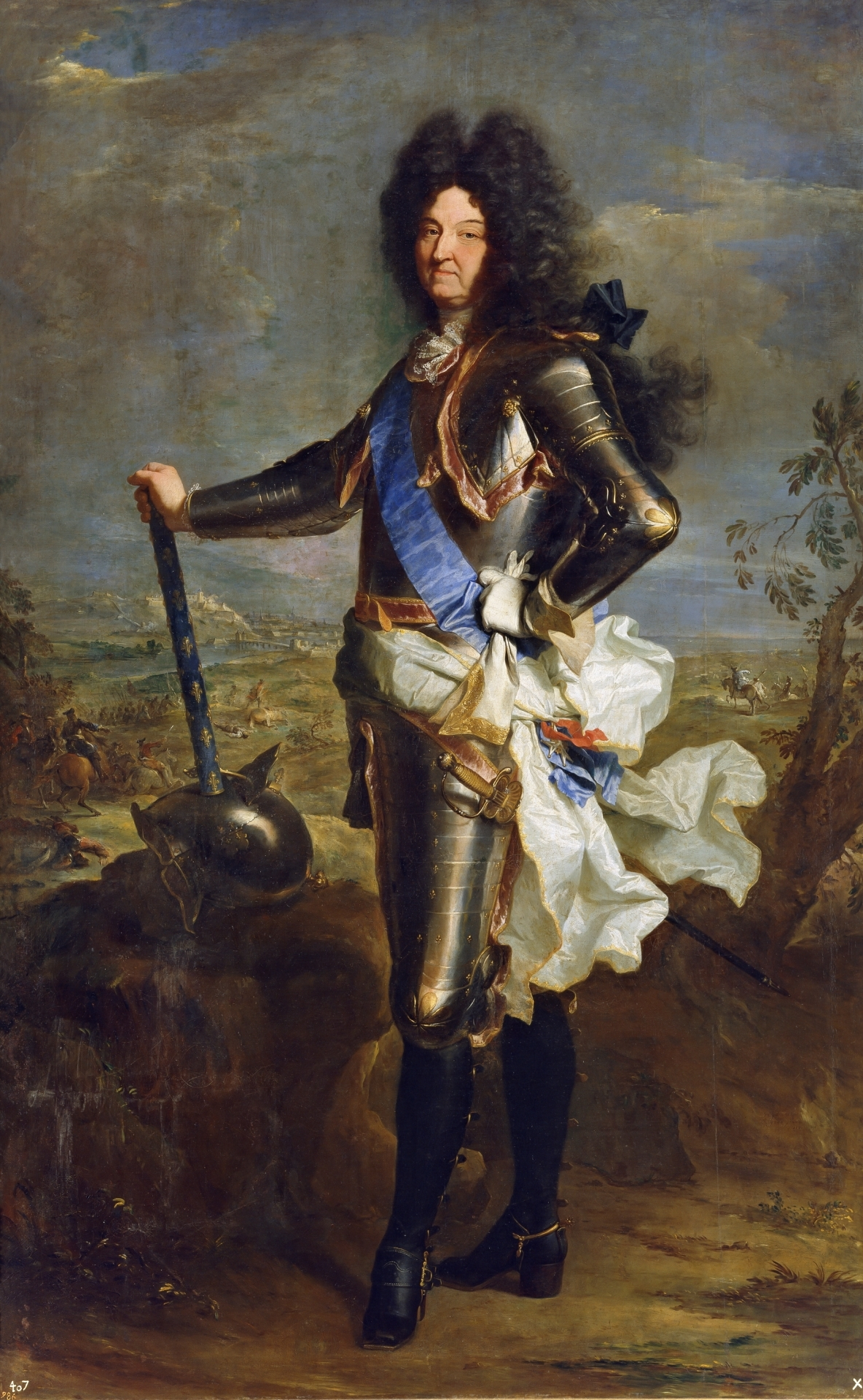
Louis XIV

On his return in late 1703, Lovat prepared a report to Mary of Modena summarising Jacobite support in Scotland, which actually appeared favourable for her son's return to the throne. After an initially warm response, news of his double dealings reached Paris. King Louis XIV responded initially by sending Lovat into exile in the middle of France, at Bourges. Misjudging the extent to which he was out of favour, he used a gratuity and a pension from the French King to help pay for lavish celebrations in the city in recognition of French military successes. Louis responded by sending him to prison at Angoulême where he was to remain, unable to influence events, for the next three years. In 1707 he was moved to the town of Saumur. He was not in prison, and able to correspond and see visitors, but he was not allowed to visit Paris or Scotland.

== 1715 rebellion ==
As late as 1714, many Fraser gentry had still not accepted Alexander Mackenzie as their chief, even though he was married to the heiress and was living at Castle Dounie. A group of Fraser gentlemen sent one of their own, James Fraser of Castle Leathers, to Saumur in order to bring Simon back home. After some hesitation by Simon, they returned to Britain via Dover. He then bided his time in London in order to determine his legal status.

At this point, political events again overtook Fraser's life. The childless Queen Anne died just before his return to Britain and was succeeded by George of Hanover. In response, a Jacobite rebellion broke out in Scotland in September 1715, led by the Earl of Mar. Seeing his opportunity for redemption, Lovat secured permission to return to Scotland and help rally the Fraser clansmen for the government.

After an arduous trip north, Fraser finally met up with his loyal clansmen outside of Inverness, which had been occupied by Jacobite troops. The Clan Mackenzie had already declared for the Stuart King in France, and several hundred Fraser men had joined them under the Earl of Seaforth. But "when they heard I was in my country", he claimed, "they 'made a great desertion in Mar’s army'". Fraser's "energy and tactical acuity" certainly reinvigorated the government's campaign in the north, and by helping ensure no reinforcements arrived, he expedited the surrender of Inverness by its Jacobite garrison on 12 November 1715.

== Restoration of the title and estates ==
For his efforts, which included securing the surrender of the Earl of Seaforth, Fraser secured a full pardon from the King in March 1716. He was now able to occupy Castle Dounie as the 11th Lord Lovat without fear of arrest or execution. Another concession by the King later that year meant that he could also claim the income from the estates, although only for the lifetime of the previous tenant, Alexander Mackenzie (now languishing in a jail in Carlisle after having risen for the Jacobites). In a further sign of his restoration to respectability, Lovat was also appointed Governor of the Castle at Inverness and given command of his own Company of Foot.

The rest of Simon's life involved untangling the legal and financial problems he had inherited with the title, as well as fending off lawsuits from various claimants in the courts (one writer suggests he may even have enjoyed them). One notable legal dispute was with Alexander Mackenzie (who had been pardoned for his rebellion in 1715) over the income of the estates, which dragged through the courts until the 1730s. It was only then, with the payment of a crippling sum of money as compensation, that Simon stood in undisputed possession of his title and estates.

== Lovat as Clan Chief ==
Lovat had a medieval conception of the role of clan chief. He had little patience for those leading clansmen who disagreed with him, and he quarrelled furiously with men such as Alexander Fraser of Phopachy and James Fraser of Castle Leathers. His relations with lesser clansmen were marked by a paternal interest in their affairs.

Generally he had a bag of farthings for when he walked abroad the contents of which he distributed among any beggars whom he met. He would stop a man on the road; inquire how many children he had; offer him sound advice; and promise to redress his grievances if he had any.

In his own estimate, he took care his clansmen were "always well-clothed and well-armed, after the Highland fashion, and not to suffer them to wear low-country clothes". In return he kept a lavish table at his (smallish) castle, with a "great abundance of all kinds of meat – and drink". As a recent biographer notes, it was really a redistribution of the rent he had collected from the clansmen.

== Family ==
With Lovat's forced marriage with Amelia Murray in 1697 conveniently being forgotten, he married Margaret Grant, the daughter of Ludovick Grant of Grant (the "Highland King"), in 1717. This marriage, "the most successful of Lovat’s matrimonial experiences", produced three girls (Georgina, Janet, Sibyl) and two boys (Simon and Alexander). Simon, born 1726, became Master of Lovat. Margaret died in 1729 and Lovat then married the 23 year old Primrose Campbell of Mamore four years later. This produced one child, Archibald, but the marriage was not a happy one and they separated in 1738. Lady Primrose when in Edinburgh lived in a seven-storey tenement on the Royal Mile known as Lady Lovat's Land, lying between Strichens Close and Blackfriars Wynd (later widened to create Blackfriars Street).

Lady Lovat was forced to live in seclusion at Castle Downey after his execution, but although officially stripped of her title was still broadly referred to as "Lady Lovat". Archibald Fraser became a merchant in London.

== Jacobite sympathies ==
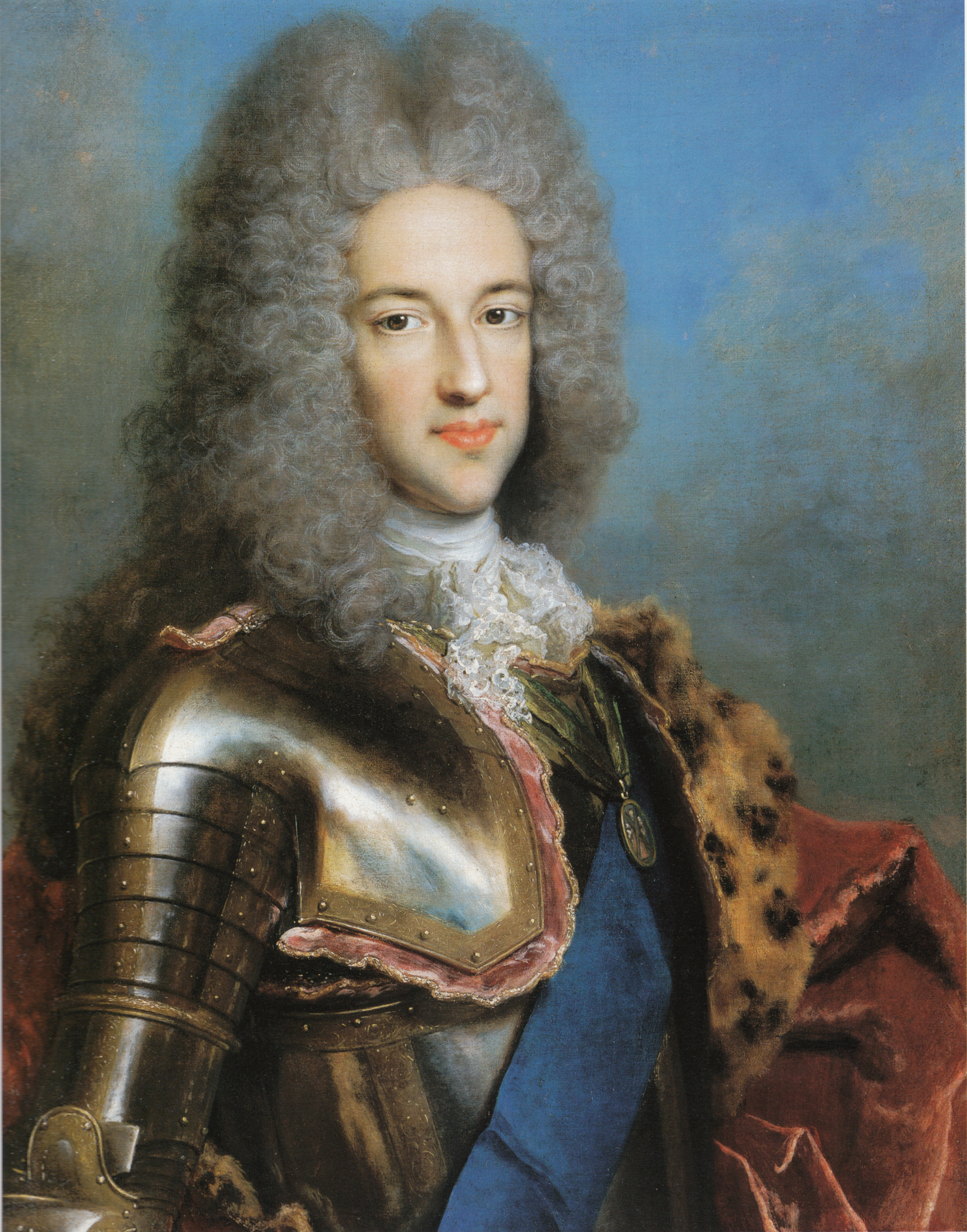
Prince James, nicknamed the 'Old Pretender' by Whigs

Jacobite ideology emphasised obedience to social superiors and traditional structures; in Scotland, it was particularly strong among clan leaders and Non-Juring Episcopalians. It has been suggested Lovat was "always a Jacobite" and his loyalty to the London government simply a means first for the recovery and then of the retention of his ancestral title and estates. The evidence suggests that like many contemporaries among the landowning gentry, Lovat's support for both the Stuarts and their rivals depended on which one he considered more advantageous for avoiding another estate confiscation. It is therefore very hard to discern any more consistent thread than that of pure self-interest.

After the failed 1719 Rising, the government concluded the Highlands could only be governed with the co-operation of the clan chiefs or heritors. Many Jacobite exiles accepted pardons and returned home, including William Mackenzie, Earl of Seaforth, which threatened Lovat's influence with the government.

In a memorial of 1724, he emphasised the role of the Independent Highland Companies in controlling the Highlands; these had been disbanded in 1717, depriving him of an important source of both power and income. George Wade was sent to Scotland in 1724 to assess these proposals and approved the establishment of six new Independent Companies, one commanded by Lovat. Wade also recommended building new fortresses, linked by an extensive military road network; in 1725, he was appointed Commander in Chief, Scotland tasked with carrying out his own recommendations. These developments threatened to undercut the influence of the traditional Highland chiefs and were far less welcome.

In the early 1730s, Lovat fell out with his Whig allies, including Argyll and Duncan Forbes. By 1737, Lord Lovat had retained Iain Ruadh Stùibhart as his main intermediary and had resumed contact with the House of Stuart government in exile at the Palazzo Muti in Rome. During an extended visit by Stùibhart to Beaufort Castle in 1736, according to later trial testimony, Iain Ruadh and Lord Lovat, "diverted themselves composing burlesque verse (in Gaelic) that when young Charles comes over, there will be blood and blows." Tragically, according to literary scholar John Lorne Campbell, only Iain Ruadh Stùibhart still has extant poetry and none of the Scottish Gaelic poems composed by Lord Lovat are known to have survived.

In 1739, Prince James' offer of a dukedom was enough to gain his support for forming the Jacobite Association, with several other leading men of Scotland. Aware of these moves, in 1740 the government removed him from command of his Independent Company; for reasons best known to Lovat, he deemed this a bitter insult. By the early 1740s, Lovat's practice of covertly granting freedom of religion, despite his official denials, to the many Catholics among his Clansmen, began to cause severe friction with the local Presbyterties of the Church of Scotland.

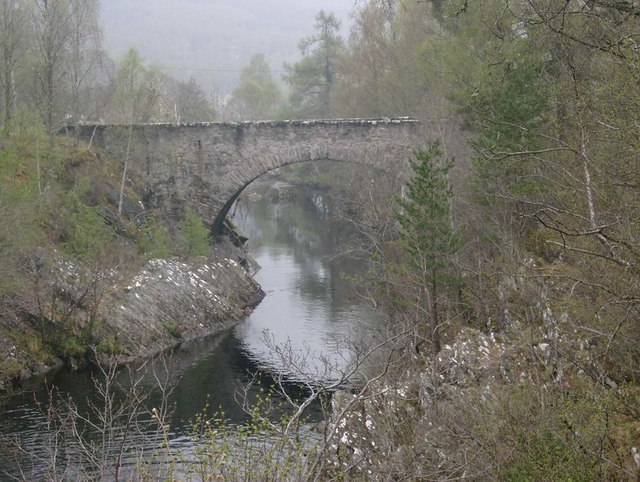
Fasnakyle Bridge, the former location of both the illegal Mass house and unauthorized salmon fishing incident.

== 1745 rising ==
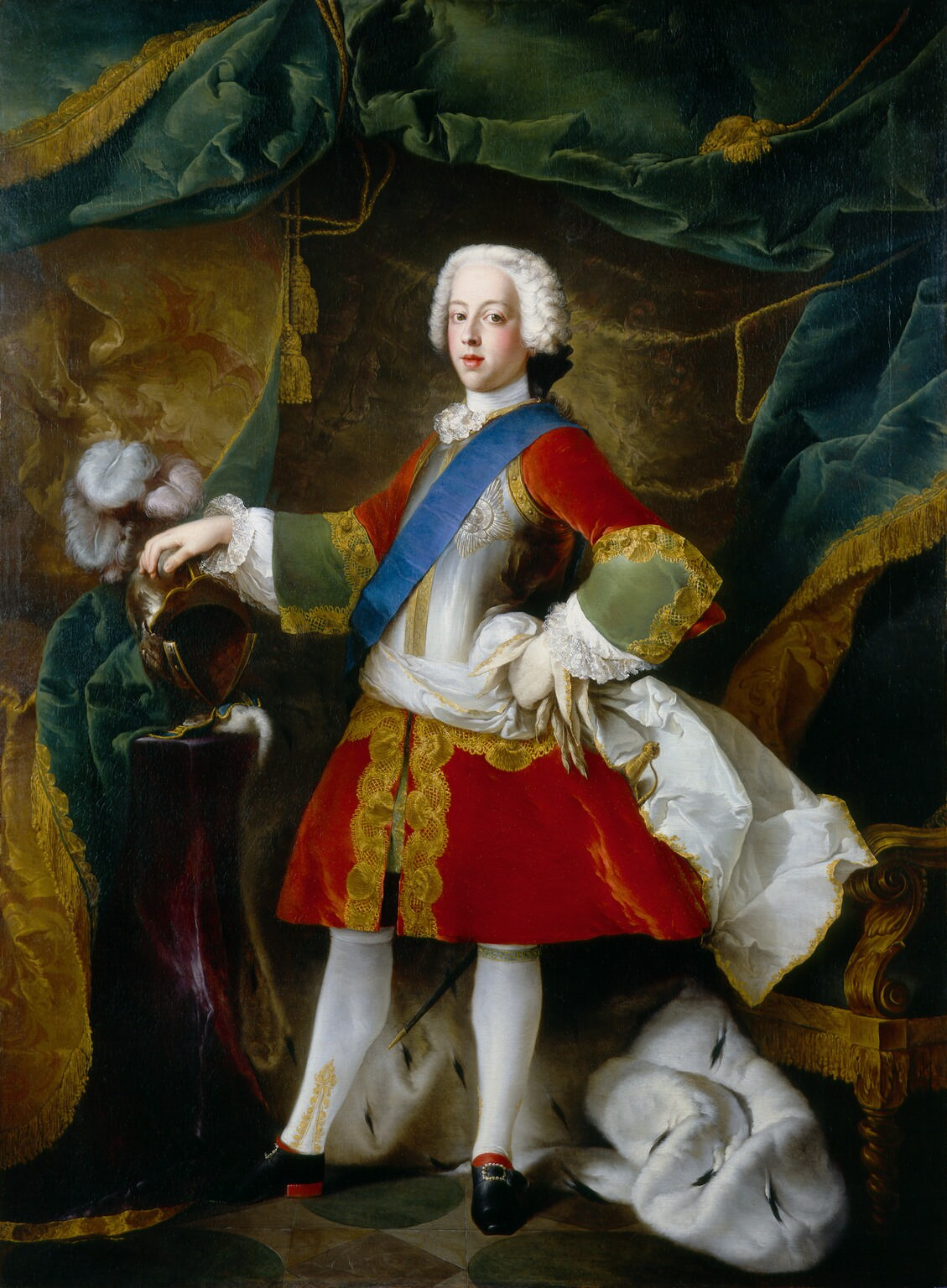
Prince Charles Edward, nicknamed the 'Young Pretender' and 'Bonnie Prince Charlie'

On 23 July 1745, Charles Edward Stuart landed first at Eriskay and then at Loch nan Uamh, much to the dismay of Scots Jacobites who expected far more French Royal Army soldiers and military advisers than only the Seven Men of Moidart, as well far more weapons and money. Many of those contacted advised him to return to France, including MacDonald of Sleat, Donald Cameron of Lochiel, and Norman MacLeod, until a more opportune time. Lovat sent messages of support to both sides and maintained contact with Duncan Forbes, who hoped to ensure his neutrality; until then, there were men drilling on his green "but only he knew why, and the law's arm was restrained till he should be forced to declare his choice".

Lovat's choices were further complicated by the fact the senior Jacobite leaders included his long-term enemies Lord George Murray and Tullibardine. After victory at Prestonpans in September, he solved this by ordering his son Simon, Master of Lovat to join the Jacobite Army. While Simon Fraser was a political Whig who allegedly considered a regime change war nonsensical, a contemporary noted his father was a "very strict man" with great power over his children. Acting on instructions from Lovat, on 16 October the Frasers attempted to kidnap Duncan Forbes from his home and attacked Fort Augustus in early December. Finally losing patience, Loudon arrested Lovat at Castle Dounie and took him to Inverness; but on 2 January, he escaped without difficulty and was transported by Fraser clansmen to Gorthleck House, overlooking Loch Ness.

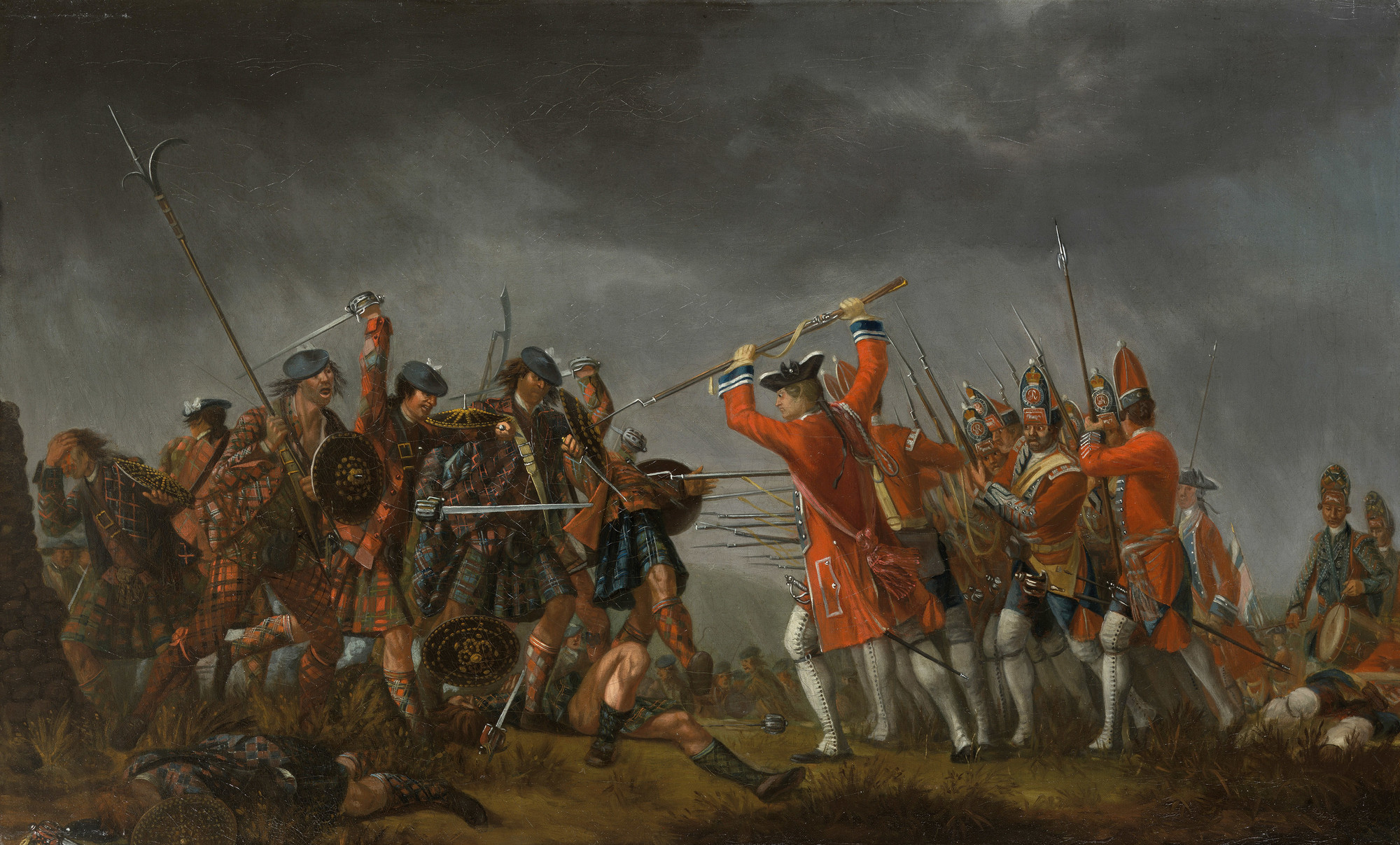
David Morier's depiction of the 1745 Battle of Culloden – An Incident in the Rebellion of 1745

Only some members of the Fraser regiment were present at Culloden in April 1746; like many others, the main part under the Master of Lovat returned only at daybreak, exhausted from an ill-fated overnight march and missed the battle. One of the few elements of the Jacobite centre to retire in good order, the Frasers withdrew towards Inverness, where they met the rest of their regiment.

== Aftermath of Culloden ==
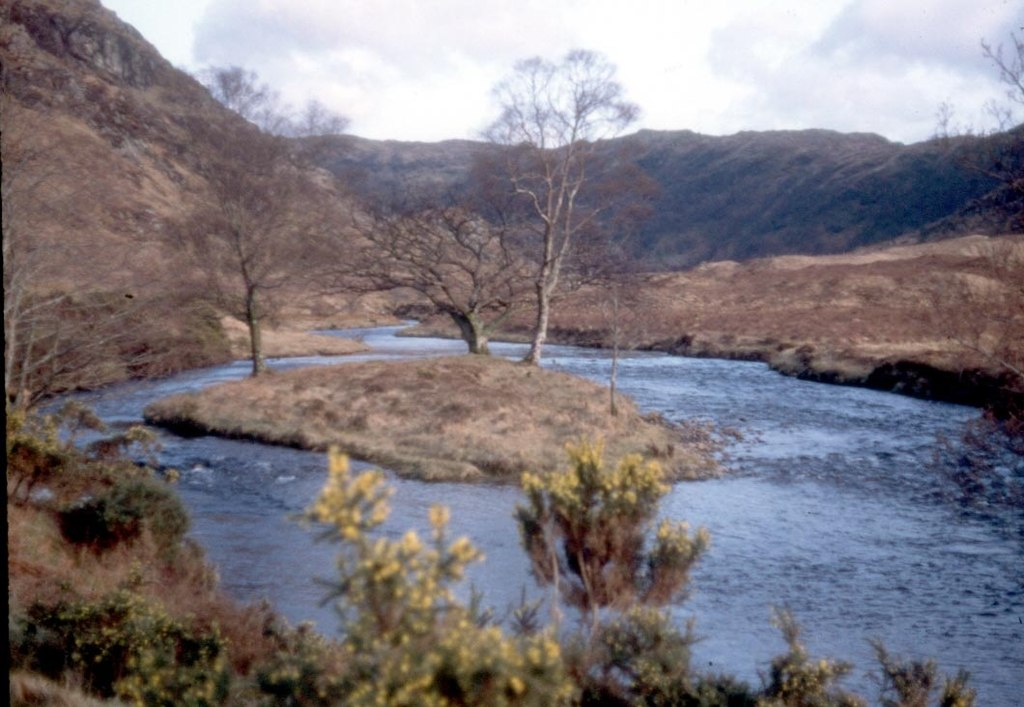
Glen Meoble, where Lovat was arrested on 7 June

Charles was escorted from the battle field to Gorthleck House, where he met Lovat, who advised him to regroup in the hills. The next morning they went their separate ways; Lovat was rowed across Loch Ness but his escape was hampered by a combination of gout and arthritis which meant he had to be carried on a litter. In the aftermath of Culloden, Prince William, Duke of Cumberland realised that the British Army did not have a good map of the Scottish Highlands to locate Jacobite dissenters such as Simon Fraser, so that they could be put on trial. This led to the formation of the Ordnance Survey. During the post-Culloden search for Jacobites, John Ferguson, commander of the Royal Navy vessel Furnace, received information that Lovat was hiding on the island known as Eilean Bàn in Loch Morar, on 7 June. In response, Royal Navy crews under the command of Captain John Fergussone of HMS Furnace and Captain Duff of HMS Terror portaged over nine miles of rough terrain. According to a later report by Bishop John Geddes, Lovat had gone to Eilean Bàn, which was a chapel, library, and former seminary for the illegal and underground Catholic Church in Scotland, to make his Confession to Bishop Hugh MacDonald, the Vicar Apostolic of the Highland District. Although both men and everyone else with them fled the island and into the mountains upon seeing the Royal Navy's approach, Lovat was unable to keep up, was left behind, and was found by the sailors hiding inside a cave along the nearby Glen created by the River Meoble. Bishop MacDonald escaped and was later smuggled to France.

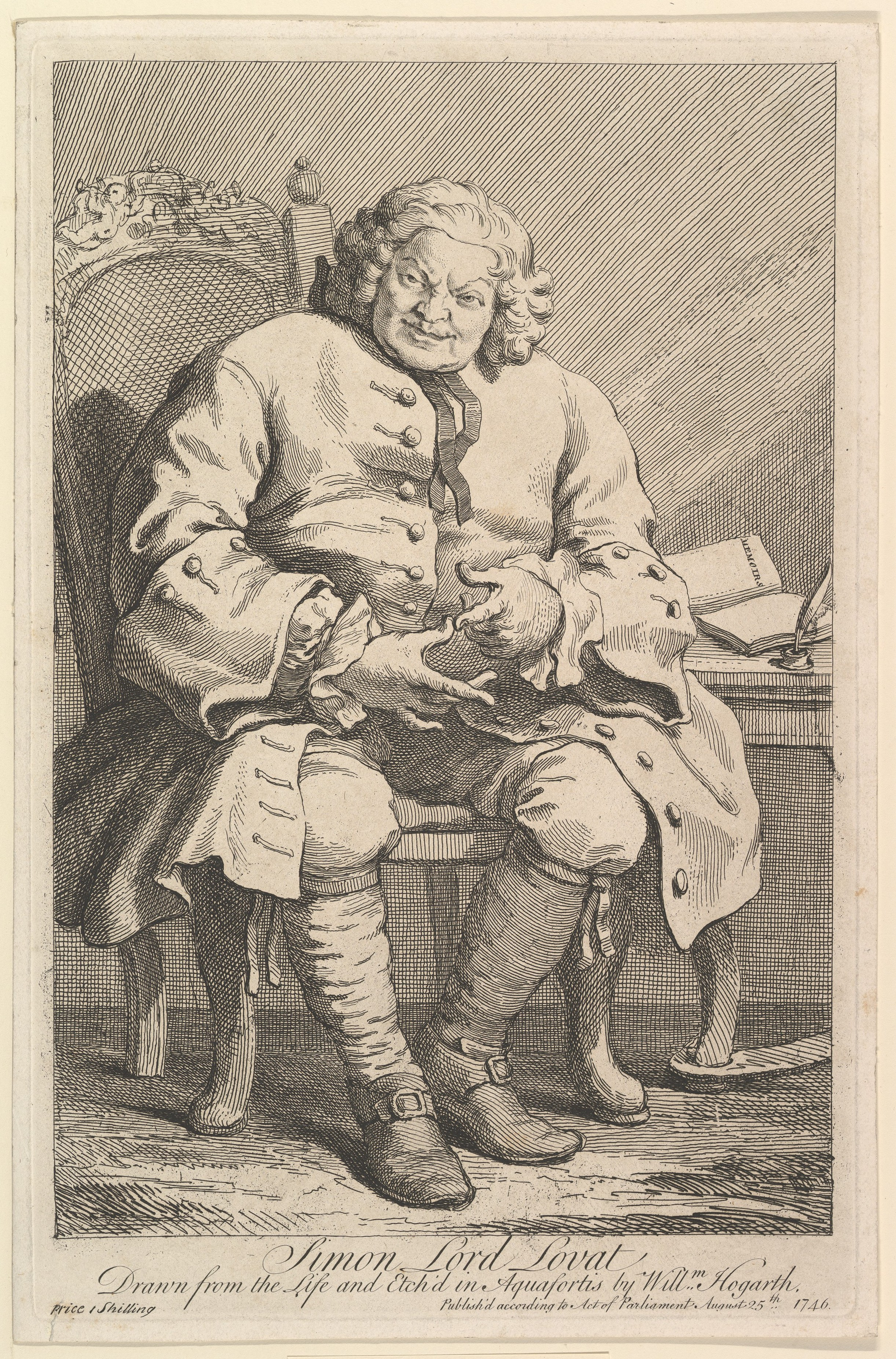
Lovat in a print by William Hogarth at St Albans, on his way to London for trial and later execution

In his naval history of the Jacobite rising and its aftermath, historian John S. Gibson commented about the capture of Lord Lovat at Loch Morar, "London, which, with the events of the past year, had come to abhor highlanders, could scarcely have been more elated had Charles Edward himself been caught. A small mythology was quick to grow up about the circumstances of his capture, as in the contemporary print of Fergussone and the soldiers of Guise's bursting in on the aged peer disguised as an old woman."

Brought to London for trial, one of his stops was at St Albans, which is probably where he was sketched by William Hogarth, later popular when turned into an etching; this shows him listing points on his fingers, although what these were is uncertain.

== Trial and execution ==
Lovat was held in the Tower of London while awaiting his trial for high treason. Held in March 1747 at Westminster Hall, this took seven days, the first five consisting of evidence for the prosecution given by Hugh Fraser of Dumballoch, Prince Charles' former secretary John Murray of Broughton, and Lovat's own secretary, Robert Fraser.

On the sixth day, Lovat spoke in his own defence, but the result was a foregone conclusion, and a unanimous guilty verdict was passed by his peers in the House of Lords. He was sentenced to be executed by hanging, drawing and quartering, the standard penalty for treason. This was commuted to beheading, the last such execution in Britain.

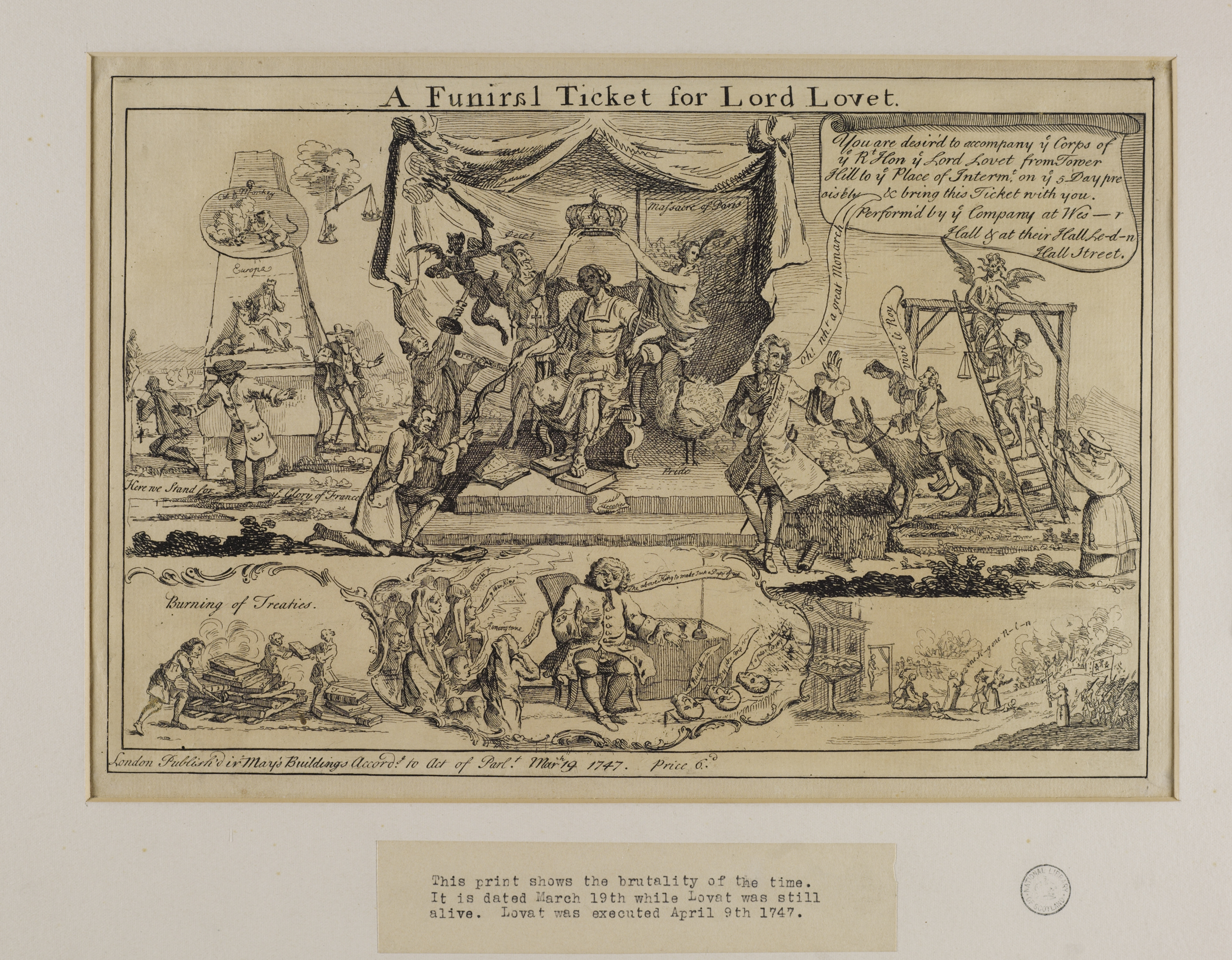
Jacobite pamphlet A funeral ticket for Lord Lovat, 1747

The day of his execution, 9 April 1747, saw many spectators arrive at Tower Hill. Among his last words was a quote from Horace: Dulce et decorum est pro patria mori (Latin: "It is sweet and seemly to die for one's country"). At the last moment, an overcrowded timber stand collapsed, leaving nine spectators dead, much to Lovat's amusement. Lord Lovat's laughter, even as he was beheaded, is alleged to be the origin of the phrase "to laugh one's head off".

== Burial ==
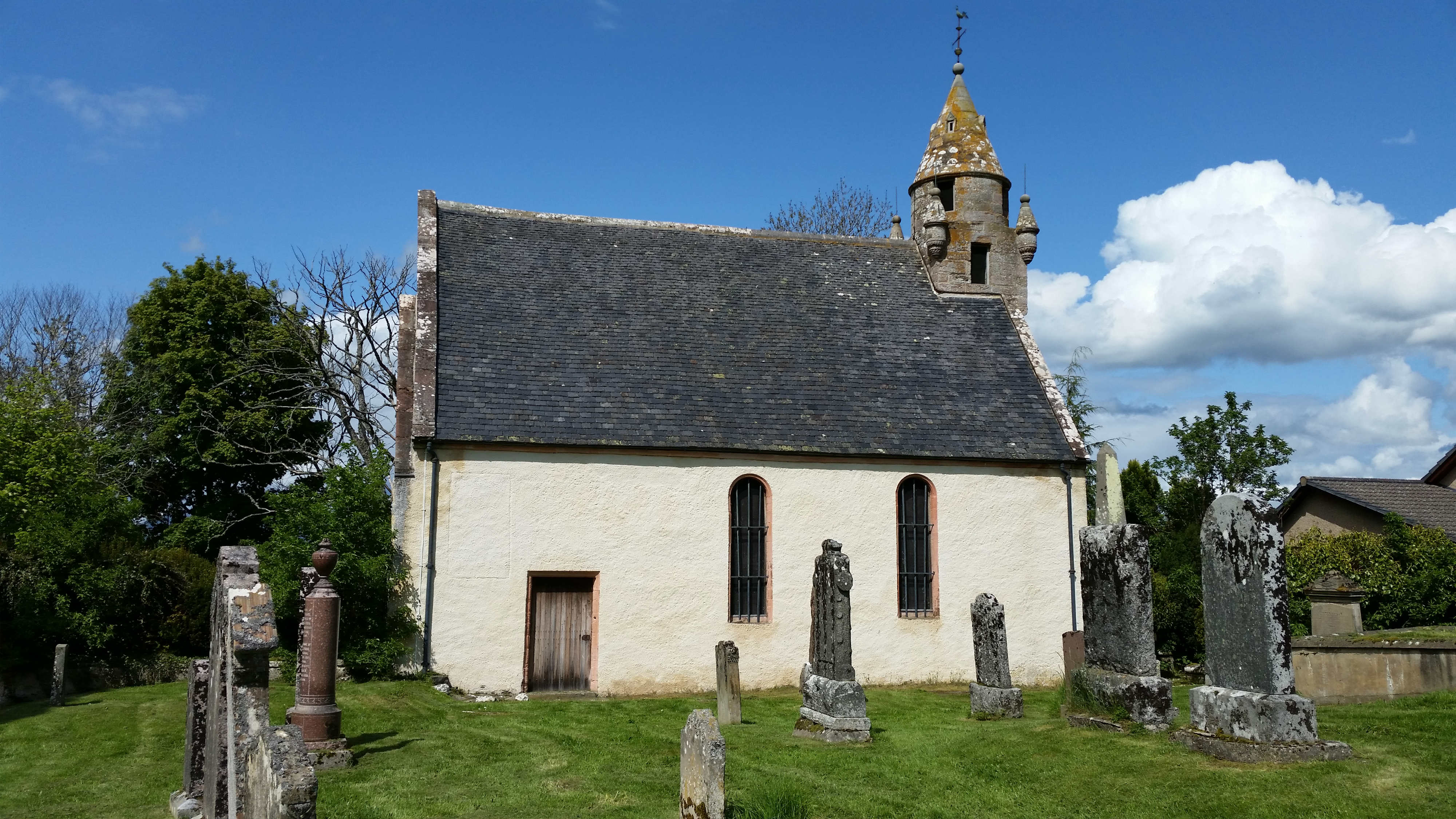
Wardlaw Mausoleum, Kirkhill, Inverness

The government originally agreed that Lovat could be buried at the family mausoleum at Wardlaw near Inverness. In the end, it was decided to follow standard practice for those executed on Tower Hill; Lovat and the two other Jacobite peers, Kilmarnock and Balmerino, were interred in St Peter ad Vincula, the chapel attached to the Tower of London. When it was refurbished in the 19th century, one of the coffins uncovered bore the nameplate 'Lord Lovat'; his name now appears on a plaque on the wall of the chapel.

For over 250 years, family tradition claimed his body was secretly removed and interred in the mausoleum. A lead-covered coffin in the crypt bore a bronze nameplate in the name of Sir Simon Fraser, with a Latin inscription; thought to have been dictated by Lovat himself, it refers to "the tyranny of the Athol and the treacherous plotting of the Mackenzies of Tarbat". (Note: In this coffin are laid the remains of Simon Lord Fraser of Lovat who, after twenty years in His own Land and abroad with the greatest distinction and renown, at the risk of his own life, restored and preserved his race, clan and household from the tyranny of the Athol and the treacherous plotting of the Mackenzies of Tarbat. To preserve an ancient house is not the greatest credit. Nor is there any honour for the enemy who despoiled it. Although that enemy was strong in his plotting and unrelenting warfare, yet Simon who was also skillful and cunning defeated him in war.)

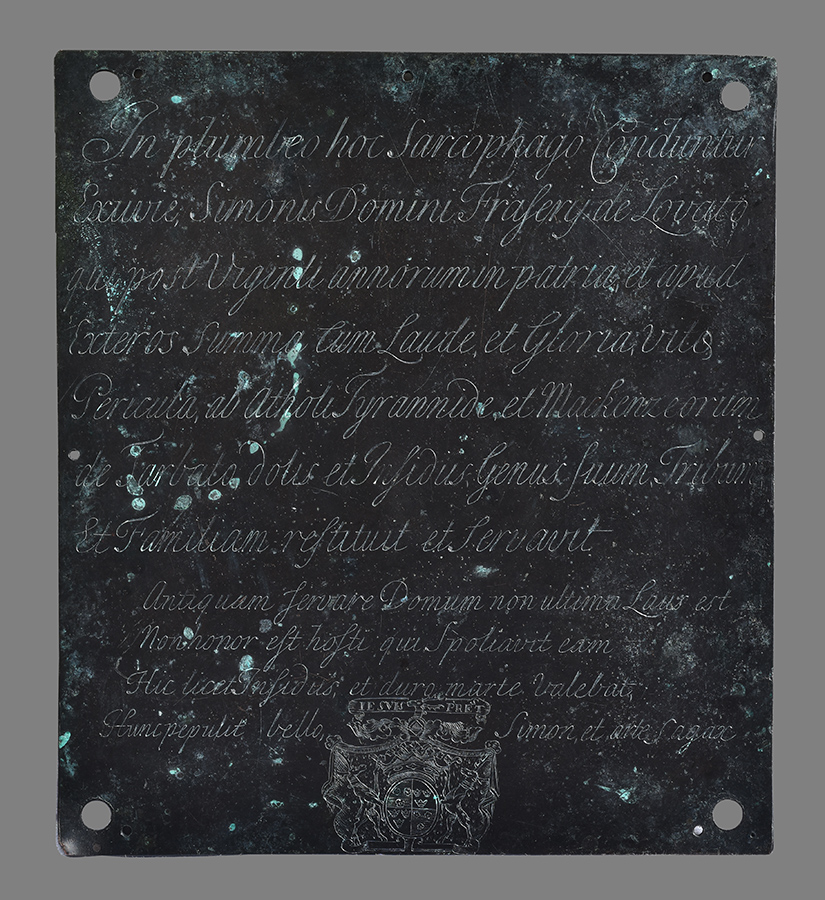
The coffin nameplate of Simon Lord Lovat at Wardlaw

However, an analysis of the bones within the coffin carried out in 2018 by the University of Dundee showed they belonged to a young woman, not Simon Fraser. One suggestion is the coffin was prepared for Lovat, hence the nameplate, but when the government changed its mind, it was sent to Wardlaw anyway; investigations continue.

At the bottom of the plaque is an engraving of the Lovat Coat of Arms. However instead of a baron's coronet there is a ducal one. In 1740, Lovat was created Duke of Fraser, Marquess of Beaufort, Earl of Stratherrick and Upper Tarf, Viscount of the Aird and Strathglass and Lord Lovat and Beaulieu in the Jacobite Peerage of Scotland by James Francis Edward Stuart, soi disant James III of England and VIII of Scotland.

Next to his coffin are those of his two sons, General Simon Fraser (1726–1782) and Archibald Campbell Fraser (1736–1815), Archibald's wife Jane and two of their children Henry Emo Fraser and John George Hugh Fraser. Archibald's children all predeceased him and by his request the estate passed to Thomas Alexander Fraser of Strichen in Aberdeenshire, from whom the current Lovat Fraser family descends.

== In popular culture ==
=== Scottish Gaelic literature ===
- Alasdair Mac Mhaighstir Alasdair, who served as the prince's tutor in the Gaelic language and who is regarded, along with Sorley MacLean, as one of the two pinnacles of Scottish Gaelic literature, also composed (Scottish Gaelic: Òran Mhorair Mhic-Shiomoin, Ceanncinnidh nam Frisealach, d'éis a chur gu bàs an Sasgunn, "An Elegy on Lord Lovat, Chief of the Frasers, after his execution in England") and which was intended to be sung to the air "Hap me with thy petticoat". The Gaelic text eulogized Lord Lovat as an honourable Scottish clan chief and Jacobite martyr, while reviling those responsible for his execution, was also published with a parallel translation into English blank verse and scholarly footnotes in John Lorne Campbell's groundbreaking volume Highland Songs of the Forty-Five.

=== English language literature ===
- Simon Fraser, 11th Lord Lovat, features as a character in John Buchan's novel A Lost Lady of Old Years (1899), Neil Munro's historical thriller The New Road (1914), and Andrew Drummond's fantasy novel The Books of the Incarceration of the Lady Grange (2016).
- He also features in Diana Gabaldon's 1992 novel Dragonfly in Amber, the second novel in her Outlander series. In it, Lovat is the grandfather of Jamie Fraser. Lovat is played by Clive Russell in season 2 of the television series Outlander and by Tony Curran in the prequel Outlander: Blood of My Blood.

=== Scottish traditional music ===
- There is a piobaireachd named after him, "Lord Lovat's Lament", and a separate slow march tune by the same name.

== See also ==
- Rachel Chiesley, Lady Grange

== Notes ==
Peerage of Scotland
New creation	— TITULAR — Duke of Fraser; Jacobite peerage 1740–1747	Succeeded by Thomas Alexander Fraser
Preceded by Thomas Fraser	Lord Lovat; 1699–1747	Succeeded by Thomas Alexander Fraser
Honorary titles
Preceded by Thomas Fraser	MacShimidh; 1699–1747	Succeeded by Simon Fraser of Lovat
