= David Lloyd Jones =

David Lloyd-Jones or David Lloyd Jones may refer to:

- David L. Jones (botanist) (born 1944), Australian botanist
- David Lloyd-Jones (conductor) (1934–2022), British conductor
- David Lloyd Jones, Lord Lloyd-Jones (born 1952), British Supreme Court judge
- David Lloyd Jones (architect) (born 1942), British architect

== See also ==
- David Jones (disambiguation)
- David Lloyd (disambiguation)
