= Siege of Brahan =

1715 siege

- Part of Jacobite rising of 1715
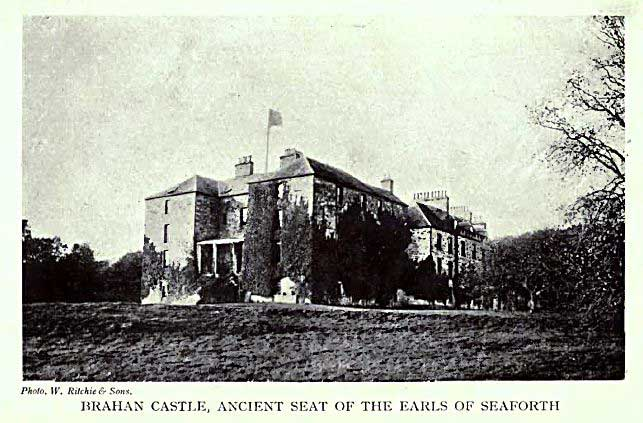
- Brahan Castle
Date	November 1715
Location	Brahan Castle, Scotland 57.5568°N 4.4893°W
Result	Government victory

Belligerents
(Kingdom of Great Britain) Great Britain: Clan Sutherland; Clan Munro; Clan Fraser of Lovat	Jacobites: Clan Mackenzie

Commanders and leaders
Earl of Sutherland; Baronet Munro; Fraser of Castle Leathers	Earl of Seaforth

Strength
1500	Unknown

Casualties and losses
Unknown	400 cows seized 200 sheep seized
- Location within Scotland

The siege of Brahan took place in Scotland in November 1715 and was part of the Jacobite rising of 1715. Highlanders loyal to the British-Hanoverian government of George I of Great Britain laid siege to Brahan Castle, seat of William Mackenzie, 5th Earl of Seaforth, who was a staunch Jacobite, loyal to the House of Stuart.

== Background ==
William Mackenzie, 5th Earl of Seaforth had supported the Jacobite cause of the House of Stuart throughout the rebellion of 1715. The rebellion suffered a setback at the inconclusive Battle of Sheriffmuir on 13 November 1715, and Mackenzie's own forces under John Mackenzie of Coul had been defeated at the siege of Inverness on the same day. However, it appears that the government forces of the Earl of Sutherland and Sir Robert Munro of Foulis, who laid siege to Mackenzie's seat of Brahan Castle, did so in a spirit of revenge, as Mackenzie had defeated them at the Skirmish of Alness a month previously. After the Jacobite defeat at Sheriffmuir, Mackenzie of Seaforth retreated back towards Inverness where he had left a garrison. However, the town had been captured by forces loyal to the Government and on Mackenzie's approach 200 men of the Clan Sutherland, 150 of Clan Mackay, 300 of Clan Grant, 150 of Clan Munro and 50 of Clan Forbes of Culloden set out to give him battle. Mackenzie avoided them and made his way back to Brahan, while his pursuers halted at the Fraser's Castle Downie. When crossing the Beauly Firth the pursuers were met by messengers of Lady Seaforth promising the submission of her son but he did not submit and fled to the Isle of Lewis and then to France.

== Siege ==
An account of the Siege of Brahan is given by Major James Fraser of Castle Leathers who took part in the siege:

Thus having put an end to the siege of Inverness, which was the very day Sheriff Muir's battle was fought, then letters were written to the Earl of Sutherland at Dunrobin Castle, lying secure, whereupon he and Sir Robert Munro of Fowlis came up with their men. But my Lord Seaforth and a great many of the clans being then come home from Sherifif-muir, the Earl of Sutherland wrote to Lord Lovat to send him a party to meet him in his way, he being afraid of a Second attack from the Mackenzies and Macdonalds. Whereupon Major Fraser in two days was ordered with a detachment of 400 men to meet the Earl of Sutherland, which accordingly he did. The Earl of Sutherland that night, to be avenged on what was done him at Alness, and the Munros, also to be revenged of what the Mackenzies and Macdonalds had plundered from them, did encamp near my Lord Seaforth's house and there destroy what they could- I must own, since I knew the whole affair, it was but what they justly deserved. Then a hundred of the Frasers and a hundred of the Munros were sent off to bring in provisions, there bemg 1500 men encamped that night, and every two men might have had a cow. Being about 400 cows and 200 sheep brought from the mountains- You may believe that the cooks were not many. There was meat in abundance. They having staid there two nights, they marched forward, and carried along with them 300 cows.

== Aftermath ==
Historian Peter Simpson states that Colonel Munro (Sir Robert) was for a time governor of Inverness and that he, along with some regular troops forced the rebel Mackenzies to give up their arms at Brahan, where they made Mackenzie of Seaforth's home a garrison for his Majesty King George. Munro, along with parties of Grants, Rosses and Mackays forced the surrender of Mackenzie, Earl of Seaforth at the Moor of Gilliecheriest.

In the months following the defeat of the rebellion, the Jacobites gradually surrendered their arms. An account from Lady Mackenzie of Seaforth to General Charles Cadogan in April 1716 states the following about what happened at Brahan Castle:

"Yesterday Colonel Brooks came hither, with, I think, 400 men, besides the garrison, and Colonel Munro's Independent Company, who, I hear, are to quarter at Brahan till all the Highlanders give up their arms. It's surely hard that I, who have been so long a widow, should, without any offence given to King or Government, be the only woman in Britain so much harassed. The arms might be delivered up at Inverness as well as here; for my diligence in sending to my tenants reiterated positive orders has appeared to the officers at this house by the delivering up of all the arms within a dozen miles to this, and by letters promising the rest at a further distance to be delivered up with all speed possible".

== Gallery ==
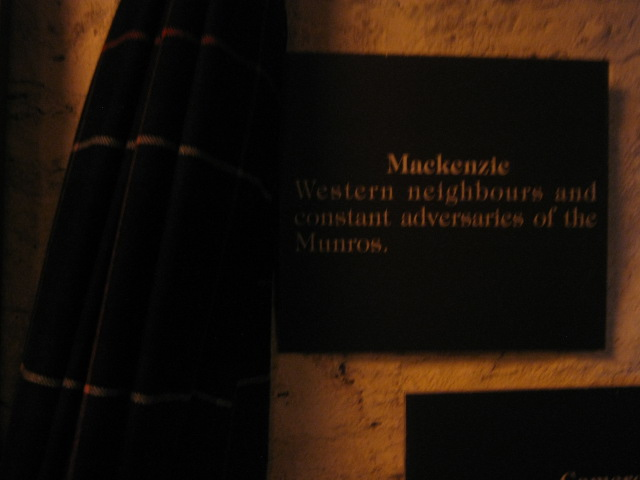
Clan Mackenzie tartan in the Clan Munro exhibition at the Storehouse of Foulis

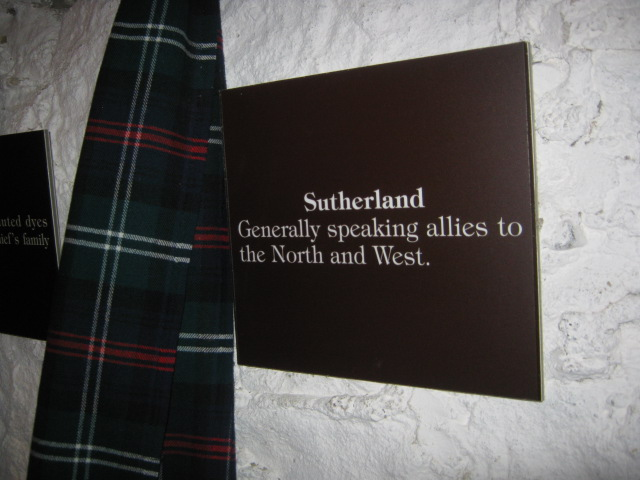
Clan Sutherland tartan in the Clan Munro exhibition at the Storehouse of Foulis

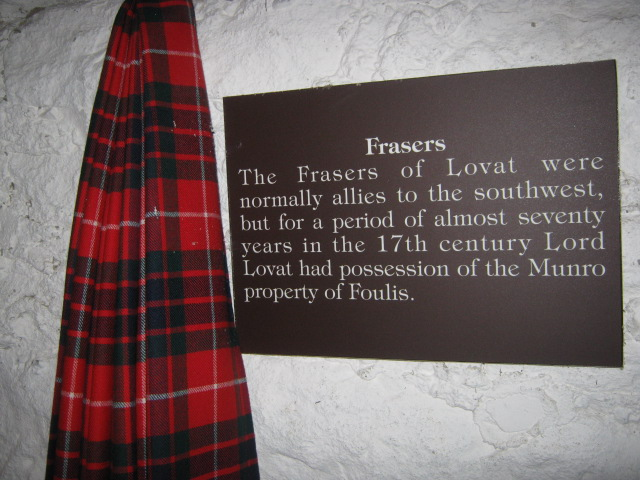
Clan Fraser of Lovat tartan in the Clan Munro exhibition at the Storehouse of Foulis
