= Archibald Campbell Fraser of Lovat =

British consul at Tripoli and Algiers

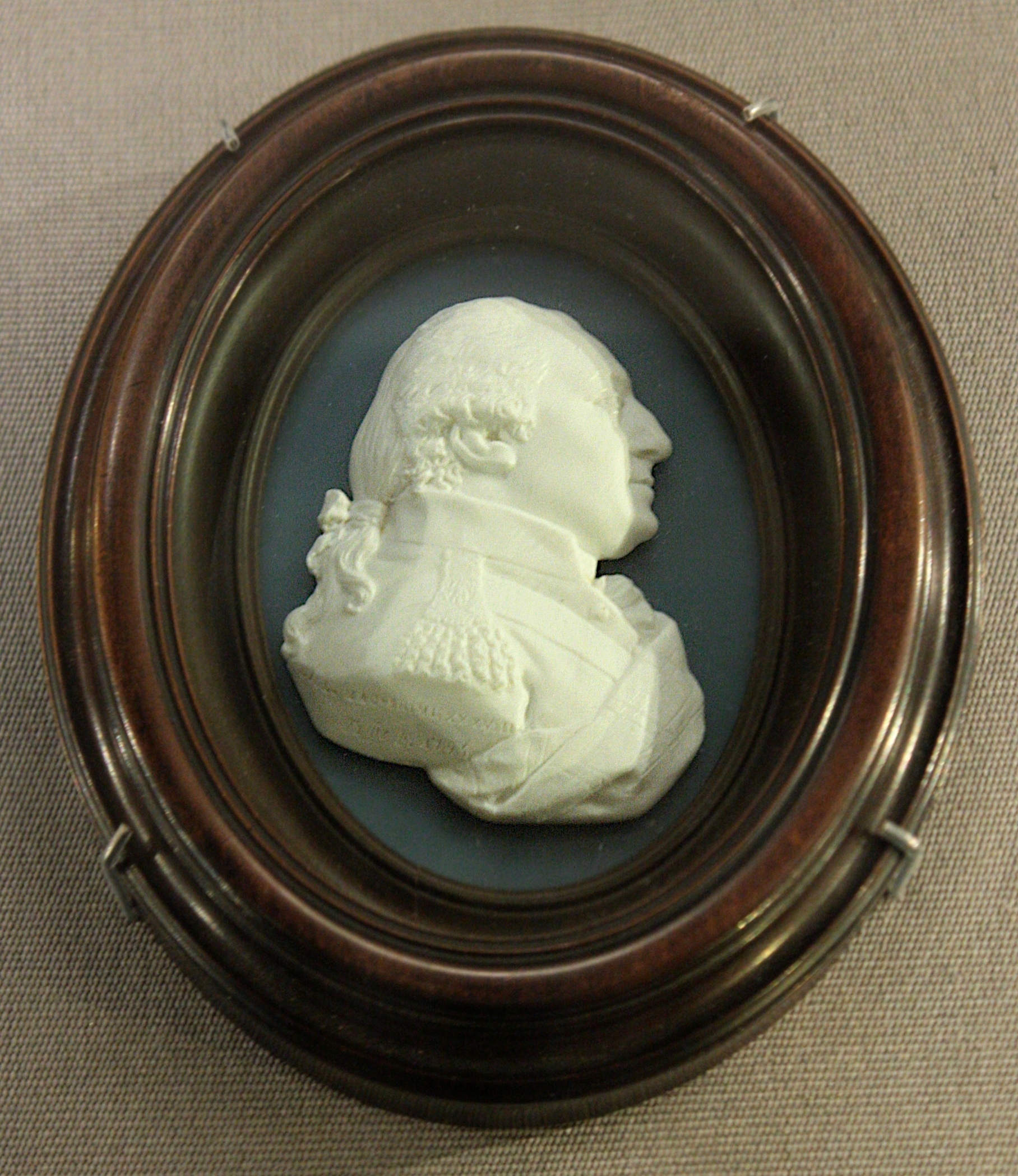
Miniature of Archibald Campbell Fraser, 1795, Scottish National Portrait Gallery

Archibald Campbell Fraser of Lovat, (16 August 1736 – 8 December 1815) was British consul at Tripoli and Algiers, and later colonel of the 1st Inverness local militia. Upon the death of his brother, Simon Fraser (1726–1782), Archibald became the 20th MacShimidh (chief) of Clan Fraser of Lovat, and sat in the House of Commons from 1782 to 1784.

== Childhood ==
Archibald Campbell Fraser was born the son of Simon Fraser, 11th Lord Lovat, by his third wife, Primrose Campbell. (She was sister of the man who would become 4th Duke of Argyll, chief of the Clan Campbell). Archibald himself was named after Lovat's early patron, the 1st Duke of Argyll. The marriage was a consequence of the long-standing bond between the chiefs of Clan Fraser and Clan Campbell.

There was a significant age difference between the couple, however. She was 23, he was 56 and had already been twice married. The marriage was not a happy one and in 1738 she left her husband to live in Edinburgh, leaving Archibald in his care.

He was at school at the village of Petty, where he was educated by the parish minister, when the Battle of Culloden occurred nearby. With some school companions, he watched the battle, where he saw Fraser clansmen in the front line. He also witnessed their decimation, with many of the 300 Frasers cut down.

His father, Lord Lovat, was subsequently tried for treason and beheaded in 1747. The title was attainted, and Archibald's half-brother Simon, Master of Lovat, was incarcerated in Edinburgh Castle for a year, although he received a full pardon in 1750. Archibald was sent to Glasgow for his education by his mother and he attended Glasgow University from 1750–1752.

== Early adult years ==
His life in his early adult years is not well documented, and secondary sources attribute a variety of activities to him. One account suggests he adopted the name Fitzsimon and 'distinguished himself in the sporting world'. It is also suggested he served in the Portuguese military, whilst his parliamentary biography states he was a merchant.

What is documented is that he was granted a small sum of money paid annually from the attainted Lovat estate. Also, from 1764 to 1766 he was the British Consul in Tripoli, and from 1767 to 1776 the Consul in Algiers.

By 1778 he was back in London. His name appears on the membership list for the Highland Society of London. This had been recently established to 'promote the Interests of the Highlands', with its particular goals being to repeal the ban on Highland dress being worn, the promotion of Gaelic language, music and literature, establishing schools, agricultural improvement, and the relief of distressed Highlanders. (His half-brother Simon was a founding member and president of this organisation). He was elected a Fellow of the Royal Society in this same year.

The Lovat estates (but not the title) had already been restored to Simon in 1774. When he died childless in 1782, Archibald succeeded as the 20th MacShimidh. However, as Simon was indebted, the estates were vested in trustees until all debts should be paid off.

== Political career ==
Archibald also inherited his brother's seat of Inverness-shire in the House of Commons. He was returned unopposed following his brother's death at a by-election on 28 March 1782. He held the seat for two years. During this time his speeches were mainly on economic and Scottish affairs. In his maiden speech, on 17 June 1782, he seconded Lord Graham's motion to repeal the Dress Act, which was passed in 1746 in an effort to subdue the Highlands. This made wearing the tartan or kilt illegal in Scotland. The Act was successfully repealed later in 1782.

In 1784 he was a member of the St. Alban's Tavern group who tried to bring Fox and Pitt together. He did not stand for re-election at the 1784 general election.

== Military career ==
Whilst his half-brother Simon reached the rank of lieutenant-general through his service in the British and Portuguese Army overseas, Archibald's career was closer to home. He was appointed colonel of the 1st Inverness-shire local militia (a type of military reserve force) with its headquarters at Inverness. He was thereafter known as Colonel Fraser.

In 1794, with invasion fears growing at the time of the French revolutionary wars, Fraser received letters of service to raise a Fraser fencible regiment (from the word "defencible"). This was a type of home guard. It was completed in the spring of 1795, with many of the soldiers bearing the name of Fraser and with nearly all raised from the old clan territory of the Aird and Stratherrick.

'The uniform was the usual Highland dress with belted plaid and kilt of Fraser tartan, but without the broadswords, as in the case of former Fraser Regiments.'

Archibald himself was considered too old to lead, so James Fraser of Belladrum was appointed colonel. The regiment was soon ordered to Ireland, where it arrived in August 1795. In 1797, Archibald's son, John Simon Frederick Fraser, succeeded as colonel of the regiment. The following year it helped to crush the Irish Rebellion of 1798.

== Other achievements ==
- Boleskine House was constructed in the 1760s by Colonel Archibald Fraser as a hunting lodge. The original hunting lodge was expanded continuously by the Fraser family until c.1830.
- Fraser was author of Annals of … the Patriots of the Family of Fraser, Frizell, Simson, or FitzSimon (published 1795, reprinted 1805, 8 volumes). Several brochures relating to the Lovat estates are entered under his name in the British Museum Catalogue of Printed Books.
- Fraser was one of the trustees of the Inverness bank according to a work entitled Observations on Objects interesting to the Highlands … By Invernessicus (Edinburgh, 1814, 8vo).
- In 1807, Fraser became president of the newly formed Northern Association of Gentleman Farmers and Breeders of Sheep.

== Marriage and family ==
In 1763 Archibald married Jane Fraser, sister of Sir William Fraser, 1st Baronet. They had five boys together, but all predeceased him. (All information in this section from Mackenzie (1896) pp. 508–509)

- John Simon Frederick Fraser (1765–1803), the eldest son, was lieutenant-colonel of the Fraser Fencibles, and sat in parliament for Inverness-shire from 1796 to 1802. He died, unmarried, in Lisbon. He had a single illegitimate child, Archibald Thomas Frederick Fraser of Albertaff.
- Archibald Fraser was born in Edinburgh, and died 1792.
- Henry Emo Fraser was born in Algiers, while his father was Consul General. Died August 1782
- George Fraser died in infancy in 1781.
- William Henry died in February 1801.

== Personality ==
Archibald at best could be described as an eccentric person, at worst an unpleasant one. The historian John Prebble described him as 'a nervous, excitable man who seems to have needed little encouragement to see rebellion and riot behind every ben'. Another historian noted that it was 'well known that he was very severe on some of his tenants'. He also appeared to inherit his father's capacity for self-promotion, by placing a memorial to himself in the family mausoleum at Wardlaw which sang his own praises. (The full text is available here in the Dictionary of National Biography). Another description of him, written 30 years after his death, states that he 'sank into habits of dissipation and over-conviviality, which impaired a reputation otherwise high in his neighbourhood, and became careless and hopeless of himself'.

== Issues of succession ==
Fraser died on 8 December 1815. As he was the last male of his line (the 'last of the Lovats') the title reverted to Thomas Fraser of Strichen. A lawsuit over the succession arose between Thomas Alexander Fraser, Esq. of Lovat, and Archibald Thomas Frederick Fraser, Esq. (the illegitimate child of Archibald's son Simon). In 1826 it led to a House of Lords committee interviewing people in Inverness-shire who had a personal acquaintance with the Lovat Frasers. These questions were aimed at establishing who was connected by blood to Simon Fraser, 11th Lord Lovat.

== Fraser's depiction ==
The image at the top of the page appears in various different formats and with different names. It may be of Archibald Campbell Fraser, but it may be his half-brother Simon. (The uploader of this image has suggested it is from the Scottish National Portrait Gallery, but it is not on their online gallery). This same profile exists as a:

- Relief sculpture of Archibald Fraser. In the possession of Harvard Art Museum, and dated to 1795. The Museum has it given the highest verification level of 4: 'extensively researched, well described and information is vetted'.
- Colour painting, showing either Simon Fraser or Archibald Fraser. Dated 1800–1830. Owned by the New Brunswick Museum but on loan to the McCord Museum in Montreal.
- Black and white sketch, with the name Simon Fraser. Located in the book 'An historical account of the settlements of Scotch Highlanders in America prior to the peace of 1783: together with notices of Highland regiments and biographical sketches,’ written by John Patterson MacLean and published in 1900 (picture at right). Possibly taken from the relief sculpture and wrongly attributed.

There is an altogether different portrait in the possession of the National Library of Scotland, supposedly of Archibald Fraser. However, the name 'Simon Fraser of Lovat, Brigadier General' has been handwritten below it, which differs from the name given by the library.

== Bibliography ==
- Anderson, John (1825) Historical Account of the Family of Frisel or Fraser, particularly Fraser of Lovat. William Blackwood, Edinburgh and T. Cadell, London.
- Browne, James (1854) History of the Highlands and of the Highland clans: with an extensive selection from the hitherto unedited Stuart papers 4. A. Fullarton & Co.
- Burton, John Hill (1847) Lives of Simon Lord Lovat and Duncan Forbes of Culloden. Chapman and Hall, London.
- Chichester, Henry Manners (1889). "Fraser, Archibald Campbell" . In Stephen, Leslie (ed.). Dictionary of National Biography. Vol. 20. London: Smith and Elder. pp. 206–207.
- Clyde, Robert (2004). "Archibald Campbell Fraser of Lovat (1736–1815): John Simon Frederick Fraser". Oxford Dictionary of National Biography, Oxford University Press. Oxford Dictionary of National Biography (online ed.). Oxford University Press. doi:10.1093/ref:odnb/10125. (Subscription, Wikipedia Library access or UK public library membership required.)
- Fraser, Sarah (2012) The Last Highlander. Scotland's Most Notorious Clan Chief, Rebel and Double Agent. Harper Press. ISBN 978-0-00-722949-9
- Journals of the House of Lords, Volume 58. H.M. Stationery Office, 1826
- Mackenzie, Alexander (1896) History of the Frasers of Lovat, with genealogies of the principal families of the name: to which is added those of Dunballoch and Phopachy. A&W Mackenzie, Inverness.
- Namier, Lewis & Brooke, John (1964, republished 1985) The House of Commons 1754–1790. Seeker & Warburg, London.
- Prebble, John (1963) The Highland Clearances. Penguin, London. ISBN 0-14-002837-4
- Sinclair, John (1813) An Account of the Highland Society of London, from its establishment in May 1773, to the commencement of the year 1813. B. McMillan, London.
- Stewart, General D. (1822) Sketches of the Scottish Highlanders ii. Edinburgh.
- Thomson, A. T. (1845) Memoirs of the Jacobites of 1715 and 1745... Richard Bentley, London.

== External sources ==
- "Fraser, Archibald Campbell (1736–1815), of Lovat, Inverness" in History of Parliament online accessed 26 December 2017.

Parliament of Great Britain
Preceded by Simon Fraser	Member of Parliament for Inverness-shire; 1782–1784	Succeeded by Lord William Gordon
Honorary titles
Preceded by Simon Fraser	MacShimidh; 1782–1815	Succeeded by Thomas Alexander Fraser
