= Thomas Fraser, 10th Lord Lovat =

Scottish peer

Thomas Fraser, 10th Lord Lovat (1631–1699), was a younger son of Hugh, 7th Lord Lovat (1591–1646), hereditary chief of the Clan Fraser. He was known as Thomas of Beaufort, which marked him as the belonging to the second line of the family tree after the chiefly family, the Lovats.

As an eighteen year old, he led 1000 Fraser men in support of the deposed Stuarts in a battle with Oliver Cromwell's army in 1651 at the Battle of Worcester. Losing, he was kept in jail at Inverness for several years.

Eventually released, he married Sybilla McLeod, the daughter of John McLeod, chief of the Clan McLeod. They had fourteen children together, although nine died in childhood. The eldest son, Alexander (1664 -1689), died of wounds while leading Frasers in support of the deposed Stuart King James II's forces at the Battle of Killiecrankie, although there are suggestions that he may have fled the country and assumed a new name.

Described as thoughtful and scholarly, Thomas became the 10th Lord Lovat in 1696 following the death of his great-nephew Hugh, 9th Lord Lovat, whose only infant son had predeceased him in the same year. Thomas was not able to enjoy his title and estates for long, since he was placed under sentence of death for the reckless behaviour of his son Simon in 1697. This included Simon threatening to hang the son of a noble, and his forced marriage and rape of Hugh's widow, Amelia Murray. As a result, both Thomas and his son were forced to flee the ancestral home of the Lovat Frasers, Dounie Castle, and take refuge in the highlands.

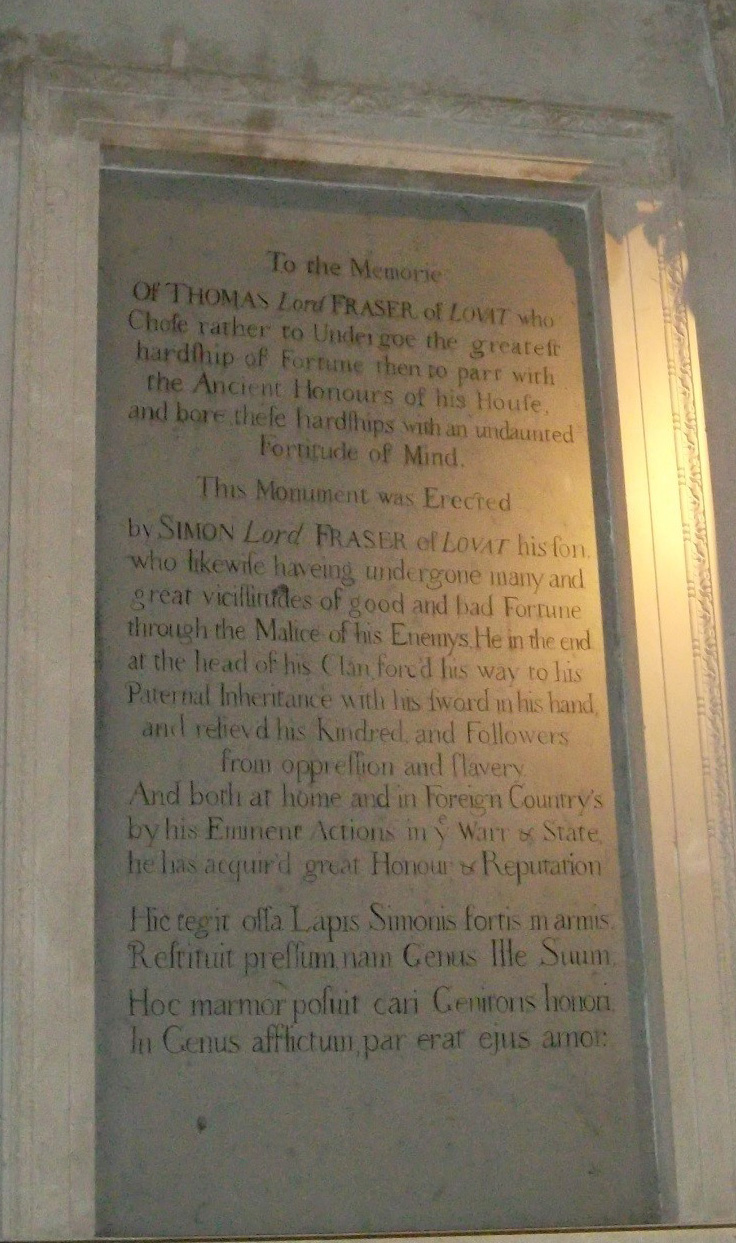
Memorial inscription for Thomas, 10th Lord Lovat.

Thomas died at Dunvegan Castle on Skye at the age of 69. He was buried there, but his son Simon, who eventually became the 11th Lord Lovat, made amends for his father's exile by placing a large memorial stone for him at Wardlaw Mausoleum, near Beauly.

Peerage of Scotland
Preceded by Hugh Fraser	Lord Lovat; 1696 – 1698	Succeeded by Simon Fraser
Honorary titles
Preceded by Thomas Fraser	MacShimidh; 1696 – 1698	Succeeded by Simon Fraser

== Bibliography ==
Fraser, Sarah (2012) The Last Highlander. Scotland's Most Notorious Clan Chief, Rebel and Double Agent. Harper Press, London. ISBN 978-0-00-722949-9
