= David Lloyd (Royal Navy officer) =

British Royal Navy captain

Captain David Lloyd
- Died: 1714?
- Occupation: Royal Navy captain

David Lloyd (died 1714?) was a British Royal Navy captain and Jacobite agent.

== Biography ==
Lloyd was in 1672 appointed lieutenant of the Henry. In 1677 he was promoted to be captain of the Mermaid, and during the next three years commanded the Reserve, Dover, and Crown in the Mediterranean. In May 1687 he was appointed to the Sedgemoor. At the time of the revolution he commanded one of the ships under Lord Dartmouth, and having knowledge of the design of some of the captains to seize Dartmouth and deprive him of the command, he discovered it to him, and so caused the plot to fail (Memoirs relating to the Lord Torrington, Camden Soc., p. 32). When the cause of James was lost in England, Lloyd followed him to France, and during the whole of the reign of William III seems to have been actively employed as an agent in the interests of the exiled king. It was through him that the negotiations were carried on with Admiral Russell previous to the battle of Barfleur, and afterwards with the Duke of Marlborough. Both in 1690 and in 1692 he was proclaimed a traitor, and orders were issued for his apprehension. But then and afterwards he escaped the threatened dangers and continued to act as a go-between from James to his partisans in England. After the death of James II he appears to have retired into private life, but continued to reside in France. He is said to have returned to England in 1714. He seems to have died suddenly in 1716. He is described as a man of honest purpose, possessed of a fund of quaint though rough humour.
