= Lord Lovat's Lament =

18th Scottish lament for bagpipes

"Lord Lovat's Lament" is an 18th-century tune for bagpipes associated with an executed Scottish revolutionary nobleman of Clan Fraser. The Lord Lovat of the title is Simon Fraser, 11th Lord Lovat. Reportedly composed by Ewen MacGregor of Clann an Sgeulaiche, or his pupil David Fraser, the work is said to be "a pibroch composed by his own piper to mourn his passing, played at the slow pace of Lord Lovat's final march of 300 paces from the Tower of London to Tower Hill."

== History ==
One history of the usage of bagpipe music by the armies of the Commonwealth during World War I reported that the troops were played the "crooning, hoping, sobbing of 'Lord Lovat's Lament,' and so went on from hour to hour through the emptiness" of Germany.

== In popular culture ==
The tune was mentioned in passing in the series finale of The Crown, in a fictionalized conversation between Elizabeth II and "Pipes," her character's nickname for the Piper to the Sovereign. The scene was meant to illustrate the decision process that led to the real-life performance of the traditional Scottish lament "Sleep, Dearie, Sleep" at the funeral of Queen Elizabeth II.
