= Hugh Fraser, 9th Lord Lovat =

Hugh Fraser, 9th Lord Lovat (1666–1696), was hereditary Chief of Clan Fraser of Lovat, but the period of his lordship is generally considered a troubled time for the Clan.

== Early life ==
He was the son of Hugh Fraser, 8th Lord Lovat (2 May 1643/1649 – 27 April 1672) and Anne MacKenzie. Both his parents died when he was young, and he was brought up from the age of six at Castle Leod by his uncle and guardian, Sir George Mackenzie of Tarbat. One historian has described this as "a sort of genetic kidnap" of the chiefly authority, in order to expand the power of the Clan Mackenzie into the adjacent Fraser lands. Management of the Lovat estates were placed under the control of the Earl of Seaforth, chief of the Clan Mackenzie.

== Marriage and family ==
In 1687 Tarbat further bolstered his control over the Clan Fraser by arranging for Hugh to marry Lady Amelia Murray. She was the daughter of the Marquis of Atholl, an important member of the powerful Clan Murray. The marriage contract contained an unusual proviso. Instead of the usual situation of a cadet branch taking over the lordship in the absence of a male heir, the estates and title of Lovat would instead go to the eldest daughter. Should she marry anyone with the name of Fraser, her husband would then assume control. It was a possible means for a man from any clan to assume control of the Lovat estates simply by legally adopting the Fraser name.

Hugh and Amelia had several daughters: Amelia (b. 1686) Anne (b. 1689), Catherine (b. c. 1692) and Margaret (b. 1695). He had two sons, Hugh (b. 1690) and John (b. 1695) but both boys predeceased him, which gave enhanced importance to the proviso of his marriage contract.

== Clan leader ==
Hugh, notable only for his "poor physical and mental calibre" was an ineffectual leader of his Clan. In the Jacobite rising of 1689 following the Glorious Revolution, Hugh instructed his clansmen to stay out of the fight. In this he was undoubtedly influenced by his Mackenzie and Murray relatives, who had sided with the government. However, the clansmen flocked to the Jacobite side instead, under the leadership of other Fraser gentlemen.

== Early death ==
In 1696, the year his last son John died, he repudiated the unusual proviso of his marriage contract with Amelia Murray as having been made under duress, and he assigned the succession to his great-uncle, Thomas Fraser. A few months later, perhaps as a result of excessive drink, Hugh himself died, aged 30. This ended the direct male line of the Lovat Frasers extending back to 1458.

Peerage of Scotland
Preceded by Hugh Fraser	Lord Lovat; 1646–1672	Succeeded by Thomas Fraser
