= James Fraser of Castle Leathers =

Scottish soldier (1670–1760)

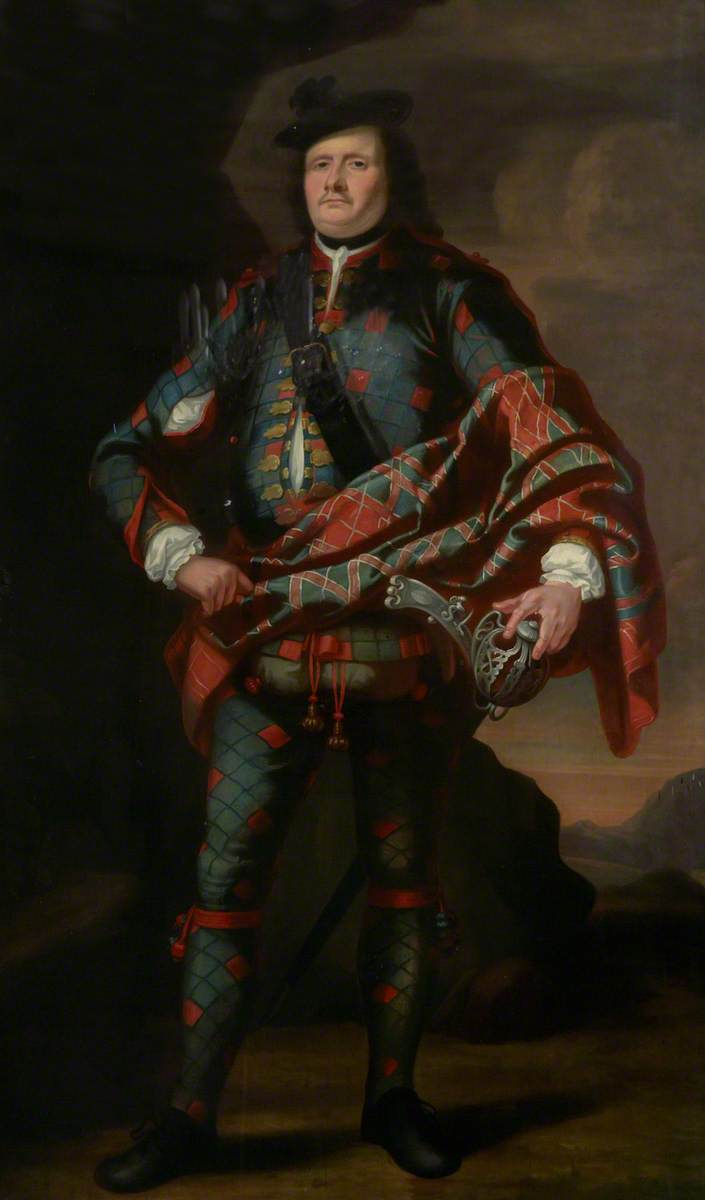
Major James Fraser of Castle Leathers (1670–1760), portrait by John Vanderbank

Major James Fraser of Castle Leathers (or Castleleathers) (1670 – 1760) was a Scottish soldier who supported the British-Hanoverian Government during the Jacobite risings of the 18th-century and was an important member of the Clan Fraser of Lovat, a clan of the Scottish Highlands. He is also known for his quarrels with his clan chief, Simon Fraser, 11th Lord Lovat who switched sides several times during the Jacobite risings.

== Background and early life ==
James Fraser was born in 1670, son of Malcolm Fraser, 3rd of Culduthel and Anna Ballie. In the direct line he was paternally descended from Hugh Fraser, 1st Lord Lovat (d.c. 1500), chief of the Clan Fraser of Lovat.

== Jacobite risings ==
In 1714 Major James Fraser of Castle Leathers was chosen by the principal men of the Clan Fraser of Lovat to proceed to France to plead with their clan chief, Simon Fraser, 11th Lord Lovat, to return home and take possession of the family estates and he succeeded in doing this. James Fraser of Castle Leathers received his commission as a Major from Brigadier-General Sir Alexander Grant, the Lord-Lieutenant of the county of Inverness-shire. He was a Major in Lord Lovat’s Battalion who were engaged in the service of the Government when Lovat returned from France in 1715 and he does not appear to have served in the regular army. At the time of the Disarming Act 1715, James Fraser of Castle Leathers gave up 36 guns, 30 swords and one pair of pistols. With Simon Fraser, Lord Lovat, James Fraser occasionally had very serious differences.

== Manuscript ==
Major James Fraser of Castle Leather’s memoirs were published in 1889 as Major Fraser's Manuscript, His Adventures in Scotland and England, his Mission in France in search of his Chief, his services in the Rebellion and his Quarrels with Simon Fraser, Lord Lovat 1696-1737.

== Portrait and tartan ==
A portrait of Major James Fraser of Castle Leathers which was painted by John Vanderbank in about 1720 is available on the National Galleries of Scotland website. A tartan based on that shown in the portrait is officially recognized by the Scottish Register of Tartans.

== Castle ==
James Fraser's castle, known variously as Castle Leathers, Castle Heather and other name variants was located near to the town of (now the city of) Inverness.

== Family and descendants ==
Major James Fraser of Castle Leathers married Jean or Janet, daughter of Sir Robert Dunbar of Grange Hill, near Forres with issue:

1. Robert Fraser, heir of Castle Leathers.
2. James Fraser of Mavisbank House, who had four sons all of whom died without issue and only one whom survived him: Simon Fraser, Lieutenant-Colonel in the East India Company.

Major James Fraser of Castle Leathers also had several daughters, eleven children in all. He died at Inshoch Castle in 1760, aged 90 years.
