= David Lloyd (footballer, born 1928) =

English footballer

Personal information
- Full name: David Lloyd
- Date of birth: 1 June 1928
- Place of birth: Gateshead, County Durham, England
- Date of death: 2000 (aged 71–72)
- Height: 5 ft 10 1/2 in (1.79 m)
- Position: Striker

Senior career*
Years	Team	Apps	(Gls)
- Sunderland
1949–1951	Sheffield United	0	(0)
1951	York City	1	(0)
Total		1	(0)
- * Club domestic league appearances and goals

David Lloyd (1 June 1928 – 2000) was an English professional footballer who played as a striker in the Football League for York City, and was on the books of Sunderland and Sheffield United without making a league appearance.
