= Brahan Castle =

Castle in Highland, Scotland

Coordinates: 57°33′25″N 4°29′21″W

Designations

Inventory of Gardens and Designed Landscapes in Scotland
- Official name: Brahan
- Designated: 30 June 1987
- Reference no.: GDL00068

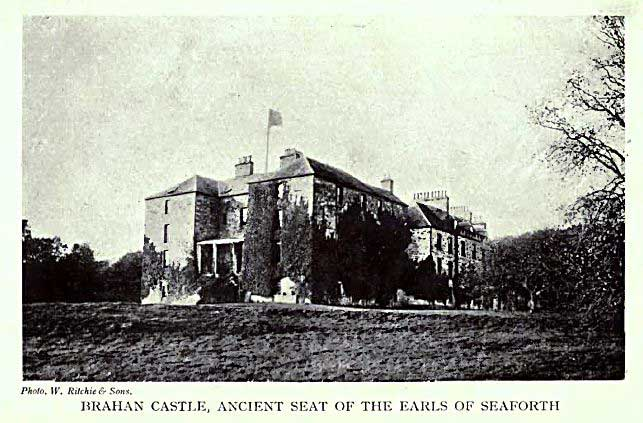
Brahan Castle

Brahan Castle was situated 3.5 miles (5.6 km) south-west of Dingwall, in Easter Ross, Highland Scotland. The castle belonged to the Earls of Seaforth, chiefs of the Clan Mackenzie, who dominated the area.

== History ==
Brahan Castle was built by Colin Mackenzie, 1st Earl of Seaforth in 1611. Kenneth Mackenzie, a labourer on the estate, was a reputed seer who made a number of prophecies in the later 17th century. He is remembered as the Brahan Seer.

The Mackenzies were prominent Jacobites, and took part in the Jacobite risings of 1715, 1719 and 1745. The Siege of Brahan took place in November 1715. William Mackenzie, 5th Earl of Seaforth, was attainted, forfeiting the estate, which in 1725 became the headquarters of General Wade during his "pacification" of the Highlands.

The estate was later sold back to the Mackenzie family, although the direct line of descent died out in 1781. The estate passed to Francis Mackenzie, 1st Baron Seaforth who carried out tree planting in the grounds. On his death in 1815, Brahan passed to the baron's eldest daughter Mary Elizabeth Frederica Mackenzie who married James Alexander Stewart of Glasserton in 1817. During the first half of the 19th century, the castle was rebuilt and extended as a large country house.

James Stewart-Mackenzie was created Baron Seaforth in 1921, but on his death without heir in 1923, he left the estate to a trust. Brahan Castle was briefly requisitioned during World War II, and after the war its condition deteriorated. In the early 1950s the building was demolished, leaving only the north wall of the 19th-century building, which served as a garden ornament. The stable block survives, and is now known as Brahan House. Several heraldic panels and other decorative stones are preserved in the house.

A monument on the estate, around 1 mile (1.6 km) west of the site of the castle, commemorates the death in 1823 of Caroline Mackenzie, daughter of the last earl, who died after being thrown from a pony carriage near the same location.
