= David Lloyd (priest) =

Welsh translator and cleric

David Lloyd (or Lloyde) (c. 1688 – 1747) was a Welsh translator and cleric.

Lloyd was the son of Phillip Lloyde of St David's, Pembrokeshire, south Wales. He matriculated at Jesus College, Oxford, in December 1707 at the age of 19, obtaining his BA degree in 1712 and his MA degree in 1714.

LLoyd was ordained deacon in 1711 and priest in 1712 by John Tyler, Bishop of Llandaff. In 1713 he was appointed to the parish of Llandefalle, Breconshire and in 1717 also to the parish of Cefnllys in Radnorshire. He held these positions until his death, which was before October 1747. He translated William King's A Discourse concerning the Inventions of Man in the Worship of God (1694) into Welsh as Ymadrodd ynghylch Dychymygion Dynion yn Addoliad Duw.
