= Munro baronets of Foulis (1634) =

Munro of Foulis coat of arms

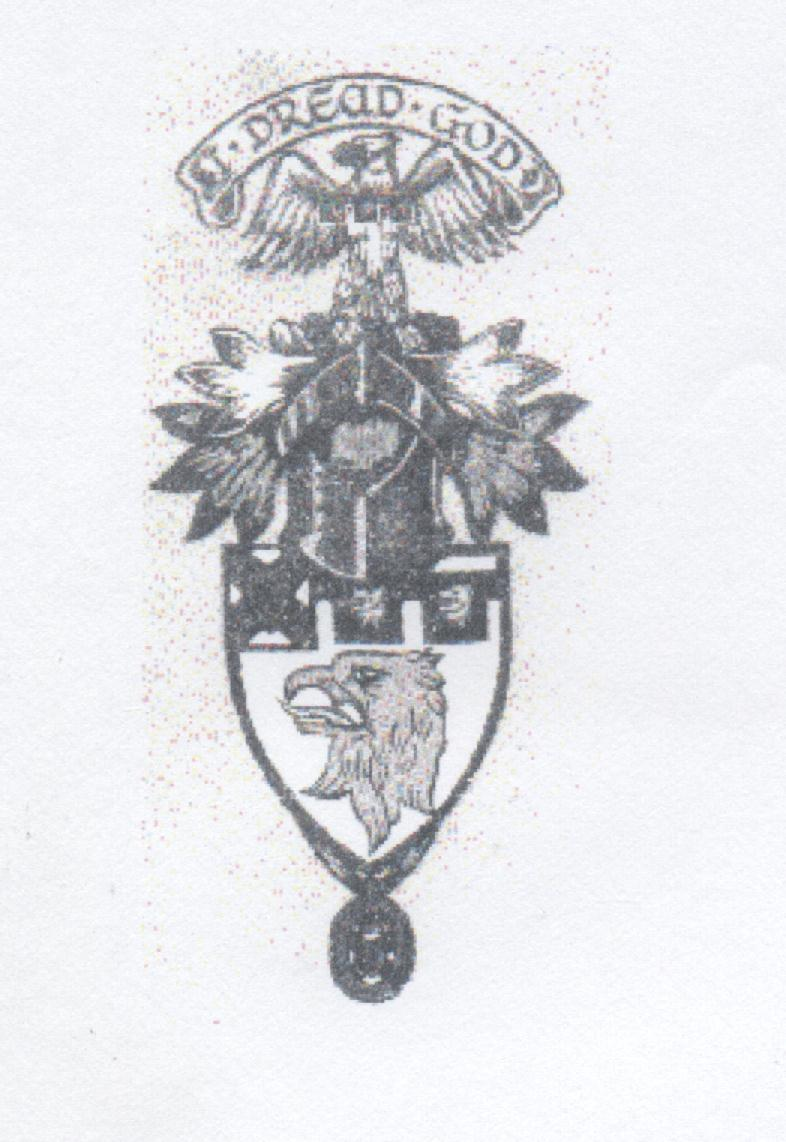
Munro of Foulis-Obsdale coat of arms

The Munro baronetcy, of Foulis in the County of Ross, was created in the Baronetage of Nova Scotia on 7 June 1634 for Colonel Hector Monro, with remainder to his heirs male whatsoever. On the death of his son, the 2nd Baronet, in 1651, the male line of the first Baronet failed and the title was inherited by Robert Munro, grandson of George Munro, uncle of the 1st Baronet.

The 6th Baronet represented Tain Burghs in the House of Commons and also fought at the Battle of Fontenoy in 1745. He was killed at the Battle of Falkirk in 1746. The 7th Baronet sat as Member of Parliament for Ross-shire and Tain Burghs.

The 9th Baronet fought in the Peninsular War and later commanded a division of the Colombian Army under Simón Bolívar. The eleventh Baronet served as Lord-Lieutenant of Ross and Cromarty from 1899 to 1935. The presumed 16th Baronet did not prove his succession, with the same for the presumed 17th Baronet also, and the baronetcy Was considered dormant from 1996.For more information, follow this link. However, the 18th baronet appears to have successfully proven his claim in 2024.

The Baronets were also Chiefs of Clan Munro until the death of the 11th Baronet in 1935 when the chieftaincy passed to his daughter and was separated from the baronetcy. From 1954, the baronets were styled "of Foulis-Obsdale" to distinguish their Arms and Designation from those of Munro of Foulis.

== Munro baronets, of Foulis (1634) and Foulis-Obsdale (from 1954) ==
- Sir Hector Munro, 1st Baronet of Foulis (died 1635)
- Sir Hector Munro, 2nd Baronet (c. 1635–1651). Last in the direct line of the Munros of Foulis.
- Sir Robert Munro, 3rd Baronet (died 1668) Robert Munro was in the senior line of the Munro of Obsdale family and a cousin of Hector Munro, 2nd Baronet of Foulis.
- Sir John Munro, 4th Baronet (died 1697)
- Sir Robert Munro, 5th Baronet (died 1729) From whom descends the Munro of Culcairn cadet branch.
- Sir Robert Munro, 6th Baronet (1684–1746)
- Sir Harry Munro, 7th Baronet (died 1781)
- Sir Hugh Munro, 8th Baronet (1763–1848)
- Sir Charles Munro, 9th Baronet (1795–1886) Charles Munro was head of the Munro of Culrain family, a branch of the Munro of Obsdale family.
- Sir Charles Munro, 10th Baronet (1824–1888)
- Sir Hector Munro, 11th Baronet (1849–1935) He was the last Munro Baronet who was also chief of the Clan Munro.
- Sir George Hamilton Munro, 12th Baronet (1864–1945) George Munro's father was Harry Munro, son of Charles Munro, 9th Baronet.
- Sir Arthur Talbot Munro, 13th Baronet (1866–1953) Younger brother of the 12th Baronet.
- Sir Arthur Herman Munro, 14th Baronet (1893–1972). In 1954 he registered the Arms and Designation of Foulis-Obsdale to distinguish from those of Munro of Foulis.
- Sir Ian Talbot Munro, 15th Baronet (1929–1996) Son of Robert Hector Munro, eldest son of Charles Munro, son of Harry Munro, son of Sir Charles Munro, 9th Baronet.
- Sir Kenneth Arnold William Munro, 16th Baronet (1910–2004) Son of Arnold Harry Munro, son of Harry Munro, 4th son of Sir Charles Munro, 9th Baronet.
- Sir Ian Kenneth Munro, 17th Baronet (1940–2023) Son of the 16th Baronet.
- Sir Godfrey Roland Munro, 18th Baronet (born 1938) Grandnephew of the 12th and the 13th Baronet.
