= Cromartie =

Cromartie or Cromarty may refer to:

== People ==
=== Sports ===
- Antonio Cromartie (born 1984), American football cornerback
- Da'Mon Cromartie-Smith (born 1987), American football safety
- Marcus Cromartie (born 1990), American football cornerback
- Russell Cromarty (born 1947), Australian rules footballer
- Warren Cromartie (born 1953), US baseball player
- Dominique Rodgers-Cromartie (born 1986), American football cornerback

=== Others ===
- Ann Yearsley née Cromartie (1753–1806), English poet and writer
- Arthur Cromarty (1919–2014), US jurist
- Cromartie Sutherland-Leveson-Gower, 4th Duke of Sutherland (1851–1913), a.k.a. Lord Sutherland-Leveson-Gower, Earl Gower and the Marquess of Stafford
- George Cromarty (1941–1992), US folk guitarist and singer
- James H. Cromartie (born 1944), US artist (painter)
- Magnus Cromarty (1875–1925), Australian politician

== Places ==
=== Australia ===
- Cromarty, Queensland

=== Canada ===
- Cromarty, Ontario
- Cromarty railway station
- Cromarty Tennis Club, Nova Scotia

=== Scotland ===
- Cromarty, a town and civil parish in Ross and Cromarty
  - Cromarty dialect, of the above area
- Cromarty (Burgh)
- Cromarty (Parliament of Scotland constituency) (1661–1672)
- Cromarty Firth, an arm of Moray Firth in Scotland
  - Cromarty Bridge, over the above firth
  - MV Cromarty Rose, a ferry that serviced the firth

== Other ==
- Cromarty and Dingwall Light Railway, a defunct railway line in the Highlands of Scotland
- Earl of Cromartie, a hereditary title created for the Mackenzie family
- Easley v. Cromartie, a 2001 US Supreme Court case (532 U.S. 234)
- Hunt v. Cromartie, a 1999 US Supreme Court case (526 U.S. 541)
- Cromartie, a fictional television character from Terminator: The Sarah Connor Chronicles

== See also ==
- Cromartyshire
