= Kirkwall (Burgh) =

Kirkwall was a Parliamentary Burgh that represented Kirkwall, Orkney in two successive District of Burghs, Tain and Wick. It tended to be affected by the same influential landowners who controlled the Orkney and Shetland seat, although as it was one of a number of mainland Burghs, this influence was not always decisive for choosing the MP

== Formation ==
Before Union, Kirkwall returned one Burgh commissioner to the Parliament of Scotland.

The Act of Union in 1708 meant a reduction in Scotland's representation in Parliament. Kirkwall was combined into a district of Burghs with the Highland burghs of Dingwall, Dornoch, Tain and Wick to form the Tain Burghs together sending one MP to the House of Commons. Under this arrangement the councilmen of Kirkwall would elect a Commissioner who would go to where the election was held, which rotated between the Burghs, and would cast their votes with other commissioners.

== Influence ==
From the Act of Union to 1766 it was under the influence of the Earls of Morton although in 1766 James Douglas the Fourteenth Earl, sold the Morton holdings in Orkney, and so the influence in Kirkwall to the government contractor Sir Lawrence Dundas and his son Thomas Dundas retained influence over the borough until the end of the century when it passed to the local radical (and later MP for Orkney and Shetland) Malcolm Laing, although William Honyman also had some influence.

== Charles James Fox ==
The most prominent English political figure, to represent a Scottish constituency in the 18th century, was the leading Whig Charles James Fox. In the 1784 general election, Fox sought re-election for the Westminster constituency. The election was close and political opponents challenged Fox's election. As Westminster had the largest electorate of any English borough, the scrutiny of votes (to check that each voter had been legally qualified to participate in the election) was thought likely to take a long time.

To avoid Fox being out of Parliament, until the Westminster election petition was decided, his friend and political ally Thomas Dundas arranged for him to become member for Tain Burghs. This involved becoming a burgess of Kirkwall in 1784 However although the Dundas family had a lot of influence over the Kirkwall corporation, the election of Kirkwall's delegate was sharply contested with Dundas's allies needing to exclude ex-official Corporation members who were opponents of the Dundas interest. The election was held in Kirkwall, and Kirkwall was one of the three out of five Commissioners to vote for Fox. Fox was not present either for the election or for becoming a Burgess, but sent a portrait as a gift to Kirkwall.

Fox was ridiculed for what was seen as using feudal tactics to stay in Parliament. It took until 1786 for Fox to be confirmed as a duly elected MP for Westminster. Fox then chose to represent his English constituency and Tain became vacant.

== Wick Burghs ==
After the Reform Act 1832, Kirkwall became part of Wick Burghs, with the same towns as Tain Burghs but with the addition of Cromarty. The system of Commissioners was lost and the franchise was widened so that the votes in each Burgh were added up.

In 1918, the Wick Burghs were abolished and Kirkwall was merged into the county constituency of Orkney and Shetland.
