= Sir Robert Munro, 6th Baronet =

Scottish military officer and politician

Sir Robert Munro, Bt
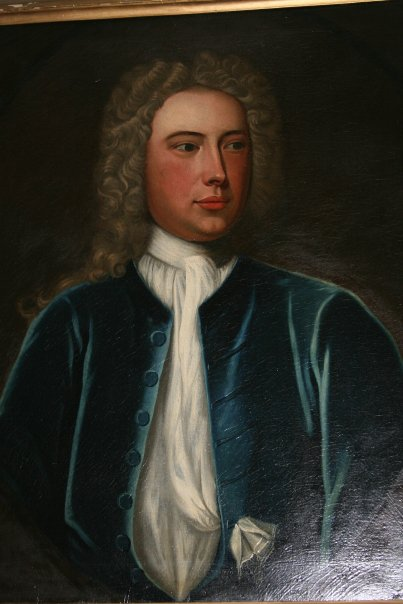
- Born: 24 August 1684
- Died: 17 January 1746 (aged 61); Falkirk
- Burial place: Falkirk
- Relatives: Sir John Munro, 4th Baronet (grandfather); Sir Robert Munro, 5th Baronet (father); George Munro, 1st of Culcairn (brother); Sir Harry Munro, 7th Baronet (son)
- Military career
- Allegiance: British
- Branch: British Army
- Rank: Colonel
- Unit: 43rd Highlanders later the 37th Regiment of Foot
- Conflicts: Siege of Inverness (1715); Siege of Brahan; Battle of Fontenoy; Battle of Falkirk Muir
- Other work: Member of Parliament

Sir Robert Munro, 6th Baronet (24 August 1684 – 17 January 1746) was a Scottish military officer and politician whose life followed an 18th-century pattern. He fought in support of the Revolution Settlement and the House of Hanover, and their opposition to all attempts by the Jacobites to restore the House of Stuart either by force of arms or by political intrigue. He was killed at the Battle of Falkirk Muir in 1746.

== Early life and career ==
He was a child when James VII and II lost his throne and the Protestant succession of James's daughter Mary II and son-in-law William III was secured. He was a young man when the involvement of the three kingdoms of England, Scotland and Ireland, in personal union under Queen Anne, sent many Scots to fight under John Churchill, 1st Duke of Marlborough, in the War of the Spanish Succession on Continental Europe.

His paternal grandfather Sir John Munro, 4th Baronet and his father Sir Robert Munro, 5th Baronet, were successively chiefs of the Highland Clan Munro: his uncle Andrew was a captain, and several of his relatives served before him in the Royal Scots. It is not surprising, therefore, that the thoughts of young Robert should turn to an army career, and his earliest surviving letter (Oct. 1706) deals with plans for securing a commission, perhaps through the influence of the John Campbell, 2nd Duke of Argyll who was in Scotland for the critical pre-Acts of Union 1707 debates: even service at home was not to be despised, as it "might draw on a greater thing". Anyhow, the commission was soon forthcoming, although its exact date is unknown, and in March 1710, Robert Munro is on record as a Captain in the Royal Scots (then at the Hague, Holland, Dutch Republic), commanded by George Hamilton, 1st Earl of Orkney. He served for seven years in Flanders, it is said "with great reputation", and found himself out of employment when the war ended in 1712, and the Treaty of Utrecht brought 30 years of peace to Continental Europe. He then returned to Scotland.

== Member of Parliament ==
But in the meantime, Robert had received a small part of the family estate from his father, and become a member of the Parliament of Great Britain. His patrimony, of which he received a crown character in 1708, comprised Meikle and Little Clynes and the lands of Drummond, near the present village of Evanton. Scotland's share in the Parliament of Great Britain at the Palace of Westminster was 15 burgh members and 30 from the shires and at the general election of 1710 Robert was chosen under the limited franchise of those days by the northern constituency of Tain Burghs (the burghs of Dingwall, Tain, Dornoch, Wick and Kirkwall), which he was to represent through five more elections for a period of 31 years.

With his Whig sympathies—which probably cost him his rank in the army on his return from Flanders—the young M.P. could always be relied on to oppose Tory measures, including their efforts to subvert the Protestant succession. The health of Queen Anne and the threat of invasion were matters of concern, and some weeks after her death in August 1714, her successor George I of Great Britain arrived from Hanover to assume the throne with Whig support. Robert by now was moving in high political circles, reading his letters from Scotland to Robert Walpole and his colleagues. London politicians liked to think that the Tories in Scotland would give no trouble in taking the oaths to King George, "but I that know them don't believe it", he wrote. When the king was proclaimed at Inverness there was something like a riot, and at Tain people were mustering and arming, with "guards upon all houses".

Support for the ministers in office was usually rewarded, just as opposition was penalised. After the arrival of George I, Robert reported sadly more than once that "there is nothing yet done" for him; but in December he was offered and accepted a commission (backdated to 9 August) to replace a Mackenzie as Captain of an Independent Company raised ten years earlier to help in policing the northern Scottish Highlands. This was one of three such companies, forming distinct units unconnected with each other, and responsible for peace and security in their own area—one commanded by Captain Campbell of Fonab operating "besouth the braes of Athole and Angus", Captain William Grant's "benorth Dee", and the third to the north and west of Loch Ness. They wore no special military uniform, being clothed in "plads, tartan coats, trousers and hose" like other Highlanders. Captain Robert Munro (who had John Campbell of Carrick as his first Lieutenant, and Alexander Fraser of Culduthel as second) commanded his company for less than two years, as the events of 1715–1716 brought him another and a more vital role.

== Jacobite risings of 1715–1719 ==
During the Jacobite rising of 1715, the standard of rebellion was raised by John Erskine, Earl of Mar, now out of office and out of favour with the new sovereign. In the northern shires John Gordon, 16th Earl of Sutherland was the King's Lieutenant, and the clans Sutherland, Mackay, Ross and Munro could be counted on to support the Government, but the Mackenzies, Macdonalds and Chisholms were Jacobites, and the Frasers of Lovat were divided owing to a disputed chiefship. The old Laird of Foulis, who lived until 1729, had lost his eyesight in early life, and the leadership of the Munros therefore devolved on his sons. Robert was in London when rumours first gained ground that a rising was intended, but his brother George Munro, 1st of Culcairn put the clan in a state of readiness at the beginning of August, and this example was followed by others, in spite of a great shortage of arms, ammunition and money.

About a week after Erskine raised the standard on 6 September, the Jacobites occupied Inverness, where William Mackenzie, 5th Earl of Seaforth put in a Mackenzie governor. Young Robert Munro of Foulis made a move in that direction, but was stopped before he had crossed the River Conon. Calling on those well disposed to the Government to support him, he then formed an encampment at the bridge of Alness, where he was joined on 5 October by clans Sutherland and Mackay and detachments from further north. Seaforth advanced-with a larger force by way of Dingwall, Clare and Boath, and after some parleying between the two sides and a council of war, the Earl of Sutherland and chief of Mackays withdrew northwards, while the Munros who had been for fighting instead had their country overrun and plundered by the massive Jacobite force. Even the manses were looted and the ministers" libraries scattered (the Presbyterian clergy were anti-Jacobite to a man), and some worse excesses were reported. It was not until 22 October that Seaforth marched south to Perth, and his enemies believed that but for this "diversion" some 4,000 Jacobites from the north would have joined Mar three or four weeks earlier than they did, before Argyll had gathered a sufficient force to oppose them at the Battle of Sheriffmuir.

In November, the Whig lairds of Kilravock and Duncan Forbes of Culloden, now joined by Simon Fraser, 11th Lord Lovat (who had been outlawed and in exile), put pressure on the Jacobite garrison in Inverness, which was delivered upon the very day when Sherriffmuir was fought and another Jacobite force was defeated at the Battle of Preston (1715). Young Foulis marched into the town with 400 Munros and took over control as governor, although his commission (and his brevet of colonel) had been intercepted by the rebels at Perth. James Francis Edward Stuart came and went (he was less than two months in Scotland), Government troops arrived in Inverness towards the end of February, and for some months the process of disarming the rebels went on, helped by a Munro detachment under George Munro, 1st of Culcairn. With the rising suppressed, and the Hanoverian succession firmly established, Colonel Robert's interest with the Government and his own compassionate nature prompted him to mediate on behalf of some of the defeated leaders (including Alexander Macdonell of Glengarry) and their wives and children.

In 1719, Robert's younger brother, George Munro, 1st of Culcairn led a detachment of men at the Battle of Glenshiel where they helped to defeat the Jacobites.

== Forfeited Estates Commissioner ==
For the next ten years Robert Munro was kept busy, in addition to his duties as M.P. and landlord, as one of the only three Scots among the 13 M.P.s appointed (by a Commons ballot in June 1716) to be Commissioners for the survey and disposal of the estates of more than 50 attainted Jacobites, "in order to raise money out of them for the use of the public". Each Commissioner received a salary of £1,000 a year, and as they could hold no other public office (though remaining M.P.s), Robert demitted his governorship of Inverness Castle and Independent Company command (both of which were given to Simon Fraser, 11th Lord Lovat). Four English M.P.s joined Robert Munro and his colleague Patrick Haldane for the Scottish part of the commission's business, but they were greatly hindered by the dilatory ways of some members (including Sir Richard Steele, who was fined for non-attendance). When Munro was in Edinburgh he lodged in the Bristo house of William Scott, Professor of Greek language at the University of Edinburgh. Many of the estates were deep in debt before forfeiture, it was not easy to find purchasers, and a balance of little more than £1,000 remained after all the claims, legal fees, and other expenses had been met. In 1725 the Forfeited Estates Commissioners ceased to operate, and the unsold estates were transferred to the Barons of the Exchequer.

== Baronet Munro ==
After having been the effective leader of the clan for many years, Colonel Robert became Munro of Foulis and the sixth baronet on the death of his father in 1729. As a landowner he pioneered the planting of woodlands, of which he added nearly 500 acres (2 km^{2}) on the Foulis estate. As a heritor and an elder of the Church of Scotland, he was one of those who arranged on behalf of the General Assembly for the spending of £1,000 a year of the "Royal Bounty" on the "reformation" of the Highlands and Islands by means of itinerant preachers and catechists. Described by a clansman as "an obliging, civil, moral gentleman, well beloved of his name", Sir Robert lived on friendly terms with his neighbours. His marriage to a member of a great English family – Mary, daughter of Henry Seymour of Woodlands in Dorset – took place in London in 1716, and the romantic story of a courtship interrupted by the purloining of their letters has been preserved by tradition. Their eldest son Harry was sent to Dr. Doddridge's academy at Northampton, Westminster School and Leiden University. Another son entered the Royal Navy.

Of Sir Robert's activities in Parliament, the almost complete absence of reported debates leaves little to be said. Outside the British House of Commons, we find him at various times trying to secure the reinstatement in a Customs post at Inverness of a neighbour's brother; he took an active part in pressing for Simon Fraser's pardon and succession to the Lovat estates; he helped to find employment for the son of a Mackenzie friend, and for a scape-grace of the Atholl family, but a political foe alleged that as Sheriff of Ross he had a Mackenzie sheriff-substitute stripped of office and replaced by a Munro.

The clan rivalries which had erupted in rebellion were finding an outlet in local politics. The chief of Mackenzie's Earl of Seaforth came to an end in 1716, and it seems to have been arranged that while the Rosses held the county seat the Munros would represent the Tain Burghs. To secure the burghs, control of three out of the five was necessary, and the manoeuvrings by which the councils were persuaded to send the "right" delegate to vote in parliamentary elections were often exciting, and even a show of force was likely. Ross ascendancy was secure in Tain, and from 1716 to 1745 the Munros controlled Dingwall, with Robert of one of his brothers as provost—but not without something like two armed Munro "invasions" of the county town in 1721 and 1740, when opposing councillors were abducted to secure a favourable result (for the first incident Colonel Robert and his brother were fined £200 each, and after the second his parliamentary career came to an abrupt end with defeat at the 1741 election).

== Lieutenant-colonel of the 43rd Highlanders ==
This probably mattered less to Sir Robert, as he was now securely back in the British Army. The Independent Companies, disbanded after the Jacobite rising, had been revived by General George Wade, and in 1739 the six companies were increased to ten and formed into a regular Highland regiment 780 strong under his command—famous in military history as the 43rd Highlanders, (later re-numbered the 42nd), Royal Highland Regiment, or Black Watch. Their uniform, approved personally by George II of Great Britain when Sir Robert presented a sergeant and private soldier to His Majesty in London in 1740, included a kilt of dark green "military" tartan, belted plaid, and blue bonnet with black cockade. The regiment's first colonel was John Lindsay, 20th Earl of Crawford, who was briefly succeeded by Hugh Sempill, 12th Lord Sempill, but Sir Robert Munro as lieutenant-colonel had the chief responsibility during the formative years.

Among the Captains were his brother George Munro, 1st of Culcairn, Campbell of Carrick, and a cousin John Munro, 4th of Newmore. The surgeon was George Munro, 3rd of Auchinbowie, a distant clansmen. After mustering beside the Tay near Aberfeldy, and continuing the duties of the previous Independent Companies for some time in Northern Scotland, the regiment was ordered to London in 1743, where a serious incident occurred. Believing that they would not be required to serve abroad, and alarmed by rumours that they were to be sent to the American plantations, about 200 men (without their officers) decided to return home and began the long march north. They were overtaken at Oundle, Northamptonshire, where Newmore was one of the officers who disarmed and persuaded them to return. Three of those condemned to death by court-martial were shot, and the remainder transported to the British West Indies: although they blamed the Government, and not their officers, for a breach of faith, it was an unfortunate start to what was to become a remarkable record of service.

== Highlanders on display to the King ==
It is recorded by General Stewart of Garth that King George II of Great Britain having never seen a Highland soldier expressed a desire to see one. Three privates were selected and sent to London under Sir Robert Munro shortly before the 43rd Regiment went to the Continent. One of these privates – John Grant died on the way but the other two – Gregor MacGregor and John Campbell were presented to the King by Sir Robert Munro. They went through the broadsword exercise, and showed their skill in handling the Lochaber axe before his Majesty the king, Prince William, Duke of Cumberland, Marshal George Wade and a number of general officers. Their dexerity and skill in management of their weapons satisfied the King.

== War in France ==
War on Continental Europe was moving towards a direct confrontation between the Kingdom of Great Britain and France under Louis XV, and the regiment embarked immediately for Flanders. There the men earned high praise for their behaviour towards the civilian population, and the regiment became a favourite choice as guardians of property; Charles Theodore, Elector of Bavaria told his envoy in London that this was owing to Sir Robert's care, "for whose sake he should always pay a regard to a Scotchman".

Their first action against the French came on 11 May 1745 at the Battle of Fontenoy. A British army under Prince William, Duke of Cumberland faced the forces of Maurice, comte de Saxe and was defeated, but the "Highland furies" (as one Frenchman called them) saved it from disaster by their gallantry. Allowed "their own way of fighting" by the young Commander-in-Chief, each time they received the French fire Sir Robert ordered his men to "clap to the ground" (while he himself, because of his corpulence, stood alone with the colours behind him), and then springing up and closing with the enemy, they several times drove them back, and finished with a successful rear-guard action.

== Jacobite rising of 1745–1746 ==
In June 1745, a little more than a month after the battle of Fontenoy, Sir Robert was "rewarded" by an appointment to succeed General Ponsonby (who was killed at Fontenoy) as Colonel of the English 37th (North Hampshire) Regiment of Foot. When the Jacobite rising of 1745 broke out, his friends in the Highlands hoped for his presence among them (one wrote that it would have been "the greatest service to His Majesty and the common cause"), but it was not to be.

Robert's regiment was brought over by sea to Newcastle upon Tyne. Meanwhile, his son Harry Munro and brother George Munro joined Sir John Cope with the able-bodied men of the Clan Munro.

"Munro's 37th Foot" made from English soldiers formed part of the force which operated under George Wade's ineffective command in Northern England. Ordered to Scotland, they reached Edinburgh early in January, in time to march out and form part of the left wing of the force led by Henry Hawley which met the Jacobites in a storm of rain and hail at the Battle of Falkirk Muir. At first, Sir Robert was reported wounded and a prisoner, and then "murdered in cold blood"; it seems that only a servant and his younger brother (Dr. Duncan Munro, who rode unarmed to his assistance and was also killed) were with him when he was shot or cut down. Robert had been attacked by six Jacobites of Donald Cameron of Lochiel's regiment. Robert defended himself for some time with his half-pike and managed to kill two of the Jacobites. Another Jacobite then shot Robert with a pistol. He then finished Robert off with three sword blows to the head. Robert's unarmed brother, Dr Duncan Munro, ran to his assistance but he too was killed by being shot and slashed.

By the orders of George Mackenzie, 3rd Earl of Cromartie, Sir Robert Munro was honourably buried in Falkirk churchyard, by men of the Clan MacDonald, where several of the rebel leaders attended. Robert Munro's snuff mull was found in his pocket after the battle by David Monro of Allan who was the Edinburgh Law Agent for the Munro of Foulis family, and it is (as of Mackenzie writing in 1898) still preserved at Allan House.

== Legacy ==
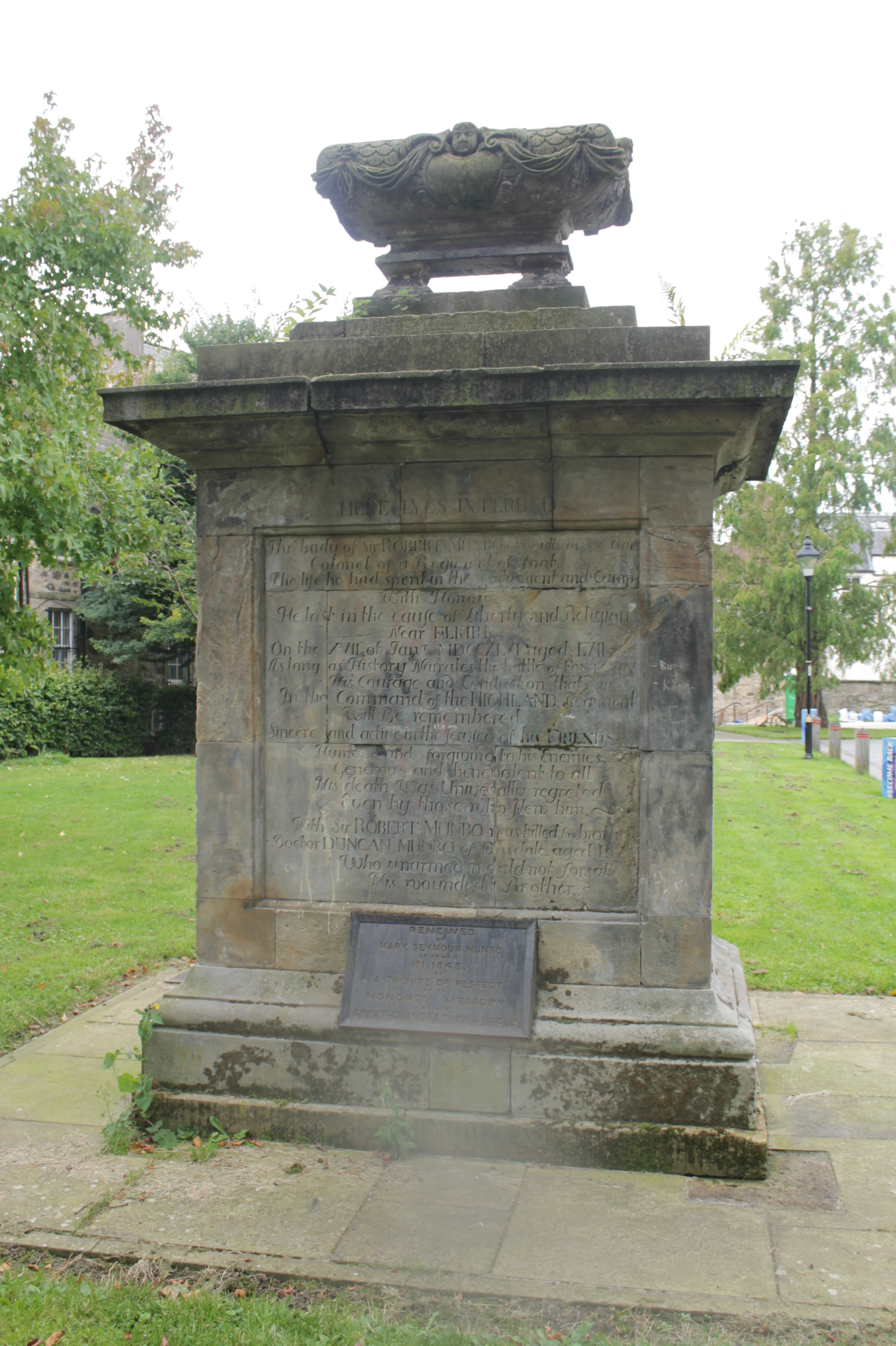
The Munro monument, Trinity Church, Falkirk

A monument was later erected for Sir Robert Munro in Falkirk churchyard. An entry in the Falkirk Parish Church accounts for October 1750 shows: "Present for the poor from Sir Harry Munro, five guineas, for the privilege of a Tomb upon Sir Robert, my Father, in the Church-yard". With elaborate decoration, and inscriptions in Latin and English language, which were renewed in 1848 and again in 1901, the monument was left in position when neighbouring stones were cleared away a few in years ago. Now, by its latest restoration, it is once more a fitting reminder of the man it commemorates: "Sincere and active in the service of his friends, humane and forgiving to his enemies, generous and benevolent to all, his death was universally regretted even by those who slew him."

== Family ==
Sir Robert Munro, 6th Baronet married Mary, daughter of the Hon. Henry Seymour of Woodlands, Dorset, speaker of the House of Commons. According to historian Alexander Mackenzie they had the following four children:

1. Robert Munro, who died in infancy.
2. Sir Harry Munro, 7th Baronet, heir and successor.
3. George Munro, who was an officer in the Royal Navy and who died unmarried in 1743.
4. Elizabeth Munro, who died in infancy.
5. Simon Munro, (1741–1790), although not mentioned as a son of Sir Robert Munro, 6th Baronet by Mackenzie, other sources claim that one Simon Munro who was a slave trader and who had a plantation in the Province of Georgia granted to him by George III of the United Kingdom was the son of Sir Robert and his wife Mary Seymour. However, the year of Simon's birth, 1741, is nine years after the death of Mary Seymour in 1732 so she could not have been his mother. Simon was apparently a 9th son and therefore had no inheritance and so he went to America and built up a mercantile business. Simon left five children: Elizabeth, Harry, Jane Seymour, Amarintha and Ann West Munro.

== See also ==
- Munro baronets

== Bibliography ==
- Mackenzie, Alexander (1898). History of the Munros of Fowlis. A. & W. Mackenzie.

Military offices
Preceded by Hon. Henry Ponsonby	Colonel of Munro's Regiment of Foot; 1745–1746	Succeeded by Lewis Dejean
Parliament of Great Britain
Preceded by Robert Douglas	Member of Parliament for Tain Burghs; 1710–1741	Succeeded by Charles Erskine
Baronetage of Nova Scotia
Preceded by Robert Munro	Baronet (of Foulis); 1729–1746	Succeeded by Harry Munro
