= Dingwall (Parliament of Scotland constituency) =

Constituency of the Old Parliament of Scotland in Highland, Scotland

Dingwall in Ross-shire was a burgh constituency that elected one commissioner to the Parliament of Scotland and to the Convention of Estates. After the Acts of Union 1707, The Parliamentary Burgh of Dingwall remained, but together with Dornoch, Kirkwall, Tain and Wick formed a District of Burghs to form the Tain district of burghs, returning one member between them to the House of Commons of Great Britain.

== List of burgh commissioners ==
- 1661–63, 1669–70: Alexander Bayne, provost
- 1672–74: Rodrick McKenzie, advocate at Edinburgh
- 1665 convention, 1667 convention: not represented
- 1678 convention: Hugh Mackenzie, merchant-burgess
- 1681–82: Sir Donald Bayne of Tulloch
- 1685–86: Donald Dingwall, dean of guild
- 1689 convention, 1689–1693: Kenneth Mackenzie, merchant burgess, bailie (disqualified 1698)
- 1698–1702: Robert Stewart of Tillicoultry, commissar of Edinburgh
- 1702–07: John Bayne the younger of Tulloch

== See also ==
- List of constituencies in the Parliament of Scotland at the time of the Union
