= Kirkwall (Parliament of Scotland constituency) =

Constituency of the Old Parliament of Scotland in Orkney Islands, Scotland

Kirkwall in Orkney was a royal burgh that returned one commissioner to the Parliament of Scotland and to the Convention of Estates.

After the Acts of Union 1707, Kirkwall, Dingwall, Dornoch, Tain and Wick formed the Tain district of burghs, returning one member between them to the House of Commons of Great Britain.

== List of burgh commissioners ==
- 1669–74: James Moncreiff, merchant-burgess
- 1681–82, 1685–86: David Craigie of Over-Sanday
- 1689 convention, 1690–?93: George Traill of Quendel
- 1698–1702: Sir Alexander Home
- 1702–07: Robert Douglas

== See also ==
- List of constituencies in the Parliament of Scotland at the time of the Union
