= Munro of Culcairn =

The Munros of Culcairn were a minor noble Scottish family and a branch of the ancient Clan Munro, a Scottish clan of the Scottish Highlands. Their seat was at Culcairn which is on the east side of Allt Graad/River Glass in the parish of Kiltearn.

== History ==
George Munro, 1st of Culcairn was the second son of Sir Robert Munro, 5th Baronet (of Foulis and chief of the Clan Munro) and his wife Jean, daughter of John Forbes, 2nd of Culloden.

According to the 19th-century historian Alexander Mackenzie, when Sir Hugh Munro, 8th Baronet of Foulis died in May 1848, followed by the death of his daughter eight months later, had there been a male representative of the Munro of Culcairn family then it would have been the Munros of Culcairn who would have succeeded to the Baronetcy of Foulis and chiefship of the Clan Munro. However, according to Mackenzie the Munro of Culcairn family had terminated in a female representative and so succession to the Baronetcy devolved upon the Munro of Culrain family, with Charles Munro, 7th of Culrain succeeding as the 9th Baronet of Fouis-Obsdale.

== Lairds of Culcairn ==
- George Munro, 1st of Culcairn (d. 1746), soldier who supported the British-Hanoverian Government during the Jacobite rising of 1715, the Battle of Glenshiel in 1719 and during the Jacobite rising of 1745. He was shot in error in 1746.
- John Munro, 2nd of Culcairn, who is remembered for the unusual hospitality he showed to a Jacobite Bishop in the 1760s and having "treated him to the best of Strong Ale, Claret of Vintage 49 and good Coffee made of his own Wheat”.
- Duncan Munro, 3rd of Culcairn, third son of John. (John's eldest son, Capt. George Munro of the 71st Fraser Highland Regiment, died in Ebenezer, Georgia in February 1779; his second son Thomas was lost overboard from the East Indiaman Worcester, off the Cape of Good Hope in about August 1780.) Duncan was a Captain-Lieutenant in the 78th Highland Regiment and was wounded at the Battle of Geldermalsen on 5 January 1795, in which he took a conspicuous part and behaved with great coolness. Duncan Munro of Culcairn died at Boulogne-sur-Mer on 17 March 1821; as his only son had predeceased him the Culcairn male line was considered extinct.
- George Ross Munro, 4th of Culcairn. Capt George Ross Munro of the 83rd Regiment died aged 19, on 11 November 1802 at Fort Augusta in Jamaica.
- Catherine Ross Munro, 5th of Culcairn, daughter of George Ross Munro. She married in 1815 Hugh Rose of Glastullich, son of the Rev. Hugh Rose, parish minister of Creich from 1759 – 1770 and of Tain from 1770 – 1774. They left children.

== See also ==
- Clan Munro
- Chiefs of Clan Munro
- Munro baronets
- Scottish clan
