= Charles Munro =

Charles Munro may refer to:

- Charles Munro (cricketer) (1871–1969), Australian cricketer
- Charles Monro (rugby union) (1851–1933), or Munro, credited with introducing rugby union to New Zealand
- Charles H. Munro (1837–1908), physician and political figure in Nova Scotia, Canada
- Charles William Munro (1864–1919), political figure in British Columbia
- Sir Charles Munro, 9th Baronet (1795–?), Scottish baronet and soldier
