= Cromarty (Burgh) =

The parliamentary burgh of Cromarty was a constituent of Wick Burghs. Cromarty had previously been represented in the Parliament of Scotland but lost its representation in 1672, regaining it in the Reform Act 1832.

Following the Act of Union in 1707, the British parliamentary constituency of Cromartyshire was created, replacing the former Parliament of Scotland shire constituency. also called Cromartyshire. Paired as an alternating constituency with neighbouring Nairnshire, the freeholders of Cromartyshire elected one Member of Parliament to one Parliament, while those of Nairnshire elected a Member to the next.

In 1832 the town of Cromarty was separated from the county, and became a parliamentary burgh, combined with Dingwall, Dornoch, Kirkwall, Tain and Wick in the Northern Burghs constituency of the House of Commons of the Parliament of the United Kingdom. Known also as Wick Burghs, the constituency was a district of burghs. It was represented by one Member of Parliament. In 1918, the constituency was abolished and the Cromarty component was merged into the county constituency of Ross and Cromarty.
