= Sir Hugh Munro, 8th Baronet =

Scottish noble and chief of the Clan Munro

Sir Hugh Munro, 8th Baronet of Foulis 1763-1848

Sir Hugh Munro, 8th Baronet (of Foulis), born 25 October 1763, was a Scottish noble and also the chief of the Clan Munro, a Scottish clan of the Scottish Highlands. By tradition he was also the twenty-sixth Baron of Foulis. Before he died a dispute took place over the legitimacy of his daughter, resulting in a lawsuit.

== Early life ==
Sir Hugh Munro was the son of Sir Harry Munro, 7th Baronet and his wife Ann Rose, daughter of Hugh Rose, XIV of Kilravock, chief of the Clan Rose. Shortly after the death of his father in 1781 Sir Hugh moved to London where he resided for many years. In 1794 whilst in London Sir Hugh entered into what Mackenzie describes as an irregular union with Jane, daughter of Alexander Law, a native of Aberdeenshire. The couple married on 24 September 1801 in accordance with Scots Law. Shortly after they married they took up their residence at Foulis Castle, Ross-shire.

== Death of wife ==
On 3 August 1803, Sir Hugh's wife Jane drowned in the Bay of Cromarty near Foulis Castle, having gone to there bathe. Three other people were also drowned in the same incident having apparently gone out of their depth in the water and although their cries brought the assistance of a boat, it apparently arrived after they had drowned.

== Lawsuit and legitimacy of daughter ==
Sir Hugh and his wife Jane had an only daughter Mary Seymour Munro who was born 14 November 1796 in London. A lawsuit subsequently ensued as to the legitimacy of Mary and her right to succeed to the Foulis estates. Ultimately Mary succeeded and continued for several years. Doubts were raised of Mary's legitimacy with the absence of legitimate heirs from Hugh meaning that George Munro of Culrain would succeed, given that the male line of Munro of Culcairn was (allegedly)^{[A]} extinct. However, even though the marriage of Mary's parents in England after her birth legitimized her, the estate of Foulis and Baronetcy of Foulis would still be separated with the latter still going to Munro of Culrain. According to Mackenzie the separation of the title and the estates would have been a serious matter to the Munros of Culrain, who as would-be chiefs of the clan would be almost landless and as such it can be readily believed that interested persons were spreading reports that Mary was illegitimate and that her parents' marriage in England several years after her birth would not have the same effect of legitimization in Scotland.

It became necessary for Mary, with the assistance of her father Hugh, to establish her legitimacy. As a result, on 27 May 1831 a summons and declaratory of legitimacy was issued by the Court of Session against the Munros of Culrain, in accordance with Sir Harry Munro's deed of entail the terms of which said that the descendants of Hugh should succeed first, if that line failed then the Munros of Culcairn, followed by the Munros of Culrain.

Duncan Munro of Culcairn had died at Boulogne in March 1821; as his only son George had predeceased him the Culcairn male line was extinguished.^{[A]} On 12 May 1835 Lord Ordinary ordered the Munro of Culrain case to be ordered to the First Division of the Court of Session. On 12 January 1836 the First Division found the case in favour of Mary being legitimate as did the Court on 15 November 1837. This judgment was appealed to the House of Lords, but in 1840 they reversed it on the grounds that Sir Hugh the father, never lost his Scottish domicile and so his marriage in England to the mother of Mary after her birth, was treated as if celebrated in Scotland where the marriage legalizes the birth of all children previously born out of wedlock.

== Death ==
Sir Hugh Munro, 8th Baronet died in 1848 and his daughter Mary intended to take up her residence in Foulis Castle, but before she was able to do so she died unmarried on 12 January 1849 at her temporary residence in Perry Hill, Sydenham, county of Kent. She was interred at Norwood having only survived her father by 8 months.

Sir Hugh had also had at least one more illegitimate child. As noted in Sir Hugh's will, George was his natural son by Isabella Ross, born in 1791. His half-sister Mary had bequeathed to George her property of Milntown of Katewell and in his will George instructed that "the Mills of Catwell and Drummond and the Lands of Swordale" be sold and the funds used to found a school, to be called the Seymour Munro Free School, in Perth. Mackenzie believed George had removed all of his grandfather Sir Harry's family papers and valuable manuscripts to his sister's residence in Perry Hill, Sydenham where they were destroyed. In fact, this series of legal documents concerning the Munro of Foulis family from the year 1299 to 1823 had been put into the hands of his solicitor Robert Jamieson. The missing manuscripts were "discovered" in the successor firm's Glasgow office in the 1930s and published as the Calendar Writs of Munro of Foulis in 1938, and 1940. The Foulis Writs have also shown Mackenzie not to be entirely accurate. George had a natural daughter, named Mary Seymour Munro after his sister (on marriage she became Mary Seymour Roberts). On his death in 1855, as instructed in his will, George was interred in the same tomb in West Norwood Cemetery as his beloved sister.

Upon Mary Seymour Munro's death the estate and Baronetcy of Foulis passed to Sir Charles Munro, 7th of Culrain and 9th Baronet of Foulis.

== See also ==
- Munro baronets
- Chiefs of Clan Munro
- Munro of Culrain
- Munro of Culcairn
- Sir Harry Munro, 7th Baronet

== Notes ==
A There are claimed male line descendants of the Munros of Culcairn

== Bibliography ==
- Mackenzie, Alexander. (1898). History of the Munros of Fowlis. Edinburgh.

Baronetage of Nova Scotia
Preceded by Harry Munro	Baronet (of Foulis); 1781–1848	Succeeded by Charles Munro
