= Siege of Inverness (1715) =

1715 siege

- Part of Jacobite rising of 1715
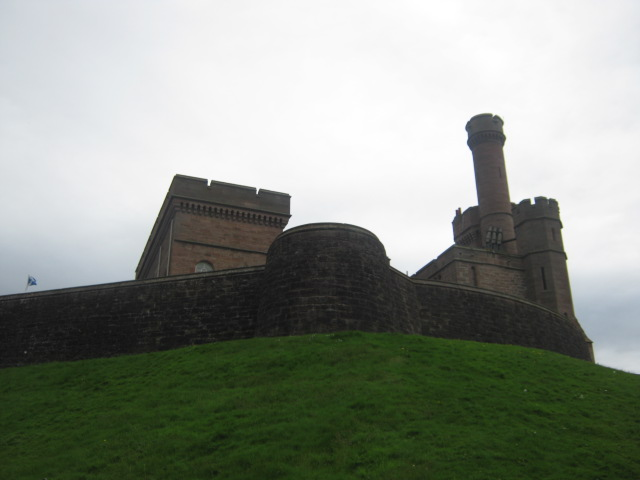
- Inverness Castle in modern times.
Date	12 November 1715
Location	Inverness, Scotland 57.4765°N 4.2254°W
Result	Government victory

Belligerents
Clans loyal to British Government: Clan Fraser of Lovat; Clan Rose; Clan Forbes; Clan Munro; Clan Grant	Jacobite clans: Clan Mackenzie; Clan MacDonald of Keppoch

Commanders and leaders
Simon Fraser, 11th Lord Lovat; Sir Robert Munro, 6th Baronet	Sir John Mackenzie of Coul

Strength
Frasers: 800; Forbes: 200; Roses: 300; Munros: 400; Grants: 800	Mackenzies: 300; MacDonalds of Keppoch: 300

Casualties and losses
1 killed	None

The siege of Inverness that took place in November 1715 was part of the Jacobite rising of 1715. The town of Inverness and Inverness Castle were being held by the Clan Mackenzie, led by Sir John Mackenzie of Coul who supported the rebel Jacobite cause. Simon Fraser, 11th Lord Lovat, chief of the Clan Fraser of Lovat besieged them, supported by men of the Clan Rose and Clan Forbes.

== Background ==
Simon Fraser, 11th Lord Lovat had been living in exile with the prospect of his clan and lands being taken over by a Mackenzie who was married to Lady Amelia Fraser of Lovat, daughter of the 9th Lord Lovat and second cousin of Simon. Upon the outbreak of the Jacobite rising of 1715, Simon Fraser, 11th Lord Lovat returned to Scotland and despite being a staunch Jacobite offered his services to John Campbell, 2nd Duke of Argyll who was in overall command of British forces in Scotland in order to restore himself in Scotland. This would be a severe blow to the Jacobites and so Argyll had to give him a chance.

Lord Lovat and John Forbes of Culloden who also supported the Government met up at Kilravock Castle with Hugh Rose, chief of the Clan Rose. Rose was a staunch supporter of the Hanoverian Government.

== Siege ==
Lovat, Forbes and Rose formed up their united forces on the side of the River Ness opposite Inverness Castle. The Inverness Burgh Council (who supported the Jacobites) sent out a messenger asking for help from the chief of the Clan MacDonald of Keppoch. The MacDonalds approached the Frasers from the rear but Lovat sent the Reverend Thomas Fraser of Stratherrick to parlay with them and as Keppoch MacDonald did not want to fight his way into Inverness he headed south through the hills. Sir John Mackenzie of Coul had also sent a message to the Clan Mackintosh chief at Moy Hall requesting that he send 500 men to reinforce the 300 Mackenzies in Inverness. In response Lovat ordered his troops to break camp and head south of Inverness threatening to lay waste to Mackintosh country. The Mackintoshes backed down and swore that they only moved to defend their lands against MacDonald of Keppoch and that they did not want to take part in the rebellion.

Lovat held a council amongst his men with the Whig lairds preferring a siege to starve out the Jacobites, but he resolved to attack the town instead. However, before he could make a move Aurthur Rose, younger son of Rose of Kilravock, along with his brother Robert and a handful of men had drifted towards Inverness in a boat. Rose of Kilravock and Forbes of Culloden had already blockaded the town from the south east. Sir John Mackenzie, on learning of the imminent attack took up position in the Tolbooth, which was a strong building in the centre of the town, and served as the guard house. Arthur Rose had taken a sentry guard by surprise with his pistol in the dark and used him to get the door of the guard house open. Rose tried to storm in but the guard raised the alarm that he was an enemy and Rose ended up being crushed in the door and was shot dead in that position by the Mackenzies. His body was crushed and was riddled with bullets. He was the only fatality of the siege.

The following day Sir John Mackenzie of Coul agreed to surrender Inverness on the condition that he could go and join the Earl of Mar, who was the leader of the Jacobite army. Sir John Mackenzie and his men immediately escaped by boats from the pier of Inverness, leaving all their baggage behind them, in a hurry to avoid contact with the approaching Frasers.

== Aftermath ==
On 12 November 1715 the Hanoverians occupied Inverness. Simon Fraser, 11th Lord Lovat marched into the town supported by 800 men from Clan Grant and 400 men from Clan Munro. Lovat left Inverness on 15 November 1715 after Sir Robert Munro, 6th Baronet had been appointed Governor of the town, and for some time the disarming of the rebels went on helped by a Munro detachment under his younger brother, George Munro, 1st of Culcairn. On 10 March 1716, George I of Great Britain signed a document that confirmed Simon Fraser, 11th Lord Lovat as a free, lawful, British subject for the first time in twenty years.

== Bibliography ==
- Fraser, Sarah (2012). The Last Highlander: Scotland's Most Notorious Clan Chief, Rebel & Double Agent. London: HarperCollins. ISBN 9780007229499.
- Mackenzie, Alexander (1896). History of the Frasers of Lovat, with genealogies of the principal families of the name: to which is added those of Dunballoch and Phopachy. Inverness: A. & W. Mackenzie.
- Mackenzie, Alexander (1898). History of the Munros of Fowlis, with genealogies of the principal families of the name: to which are added those of Lexington and New England. Inverness: A. & W. Mackenzie.
- Rose, D. Murray (1897). Historical notes; or Essays on the '15 and '45. 26 Princes Street, Edinburgh: William Brown.
