= George Mackenzie (died 1760) =

Scottish politician

George Mackenzie (c.1662–1760) of Inchcoulter, Balconie, Kiltearn, Ross-shire, was a Scottish Tory politician who sat in the Parliament of Scotland from 1704 to 1707, and in the British House of Commons from 1710 to 1713.

Mackenzie was the eldest son of Alexander Mackenzie of Inchcoulter and his first wife. Katherine Mackenzie, daughter of William Mackenzie of Belmathudie, Knockbairn, Ross- shire. He succeeded his father in about 1687. He married Anne Mackenzie (with 5,000 merks), daughter of Mackenzie of Fairburn, Ross-shire in June 1695.

By 1704, Mackenzie was appointed Sheriff depute for Ross-shire. He was returned as Shire Commissioner for Ross-shire at a by election in 1704. After the Act of Union in 1707, he was not one of those returned to the British House of Commons for Scotland.

Mackenzie became provost of Fortrose in 1710 and was also elected Member of Parliament for Inverness Burghs at the 1710 general election. He voted consistently against the government and was a member of the High Tory October Club. He lost the seat at the 1713 general election and also ceased to be provost of Fortrose. In 1715 lost the post of Collector, rents and duties for the Earldom of Ross and the Lordship of Ardmarnock, which had been presented to him earlier. From time to time he expressed Jacobite sentiments, but never took any action.

Mackenzie died on 1 April 1760, at the age of 98. He had two sons and five daughters,.

Parliament of Great Britain
Preceded by Alexander Duff	Member of Parliament for Inverness Burghs; 1710–1713	Succeeded by William Steuart
