= Henry Ponsonby (British Army officer, born 1685) =

British Army officer and politician

Major-General Henry Ponsonby (1685 – 11 May 1745) was a British Army officer and politician.

He was the son of William Ponsonby, 1st Viscount Duncannon and brother of Brabazon Ponsonby, 1st Earl of Bessborough. He married his cousin Lady Frances Brabazon, daughter of Chambré Brabazon, 5th Earl of Meath, and was father of Chambré Brabazon Ponsonby.

He sat in the Irish House of Commons for Fethard from 1715 to 1727. In 1727 he was elected for both Clomines and Inistioge, sitting for the latter constituency until his death.

He reached the rank of major general and was colonel of a Regiment of Foot, (later the 37th Regiment of Foot), from 1735 to his death. He was killed at the Battle of Fontenoy in 1745.

Military offices
| Preceded by Hon. Robert Murray | Colonel of Ponsonby's Regiment of Foot; 1735–1745 | Succeeded by Sir Robert Munro, Bt. |
