= Battle of Inverurie (1745) =

Battle in Jacobite rising

Coordinates: 57.282°N 2.378°W

- Part of the Jacobite rising of 1745
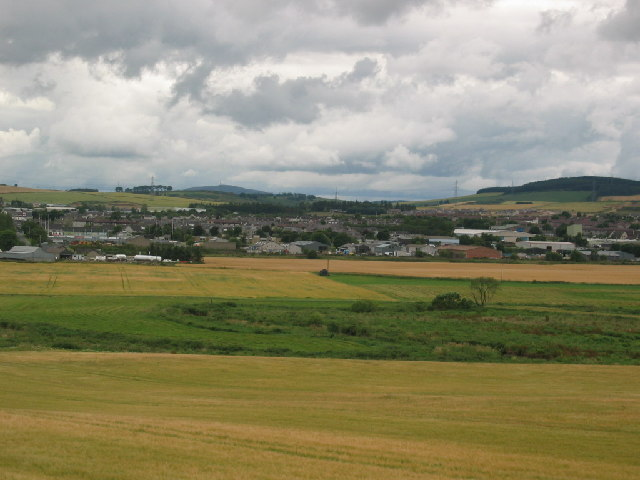
- Present-day view of the battlefield
Date	23 December 1745
Location	Inverurie, Scotland, Great Britain
Result	Jacobite/French victory

Belligerents
Jacobites; France	Great Britain

Commanders and leaders
Lewis Gordon	Norman MacLeod; George Munro

Strength
900	500

Casualties and losses
14–60 killed 20 wounded	7–"many" killed 22 wounded 50 captured

The Battle of Inverurie was fought on 23 December 1745 at Inverurie, Aberdeenshire, Scotland, during the Jacobite rising of 1745.

== Background ==
After the Jacobite capture of Edinburgh in autumn 1745, Lord Lewis Gordon had been designated as the Jacobite Lord Lieutenant of Aberdeenshire and was given responsibility for raising men in north-eastern Scotland. With a mix of volunteers and men "pressed" into service, he mustered a relatively-large regiment including three battalions: the "Aberdeen" battalion, mainly volunteers from Aberdeen itself led by James Moir of Stonywood; the "Strathbogie" battalion, unwilling feudal levies under John Gordon of Avochie; and the "Mar" battalion, mostly Highlanders raised by Francis Farquharson of Monaltrie in Braemar and upper Deeside. Gordon also set up a parallel civil administration, levying the cess in an effort to gain the Jacobites additional funds.

In December the government commander-in-chief in the north, John Campbell, 4th Earl of Loudoun, sent Norman MacLeod of MacLeod from Inverness with 500 men of the Independent Highland Companies to confront Gordon. MacLeod was to pick up reinforcement en route from George Munro, 1st of Culcairn with 200 men and the Laird of Grant with a further 500.

Gordon ordered his men to fall back to Aberdeen, where he was reinforced by part of Lord Ogilvy's Regiment from Forfarshire and Kincardineshire. He was also joined by a small detachment of Franco-Irish and Scottish regulars sent by Lord John Drummond, Who had landed at Montrose a few weeks previously.

== Battle ==
Grant decided to return home, and Culcairn initially held post at Oldmeldrum. MacLeod, however, continued and occupied the town of Inverurie, 16 miles north-west of Aberdeen. On hearing of MacLeod's advance, Gordon determined to make a pre-emptive attack.

Gordon eventually left Aberdeen on 23 December with 1,100 men and 5 pieces of cannon thar had been taken off a ship in the harbour. He nominally led one column of Jacobite troops and Avochie another, but in reality, it appears that active command was delegated to Major Lancelot Cuthbert, brother of the laird of Castlehill and a regular in the French Royal-Ecossais, who "did all the business".

The Jacobites crossed the Bridge of Don and took the route by Fintray up the left bank of the river, and Gordon sent a detachment of 300 men, including the French regulars, by the Tyrebagger road - the main road to Inverurie, to deceive MacLeod as to his real intentions.

The 20th-century historian Ruairidh MacLeod gave an account of the Battle of Inverurie in volume LIII of the Transactions of the Gaelic Society of Inverness, quoting from contemporary documents. At about four o'clock in the afternoon, the Irish picquets, who had marched by the right bank of the River Don, waded across the river at the ford south of Inverurie and attacked MacLeod's troops on the south-western side of the town. About 60 of MacLeod's men engaged them at the ford, where the rebels lost most of their casualties, including 11 dead among the French regulars.

Gordon then crossed the River Ury and attacked the town in the area of the church, taking the defenders by surprise, although they fired several volleys as the main body of rebels crossed the river. The MacLeods then retreated down the main street of Inverurie, firing a few additional volleys before retiring northwards. Unable to hold their positions, they were pushed back to Elgin during the course of the evening.

According to Ruaridh MacLeod, the Government troops lost seven dead, with 5 killed in battle, 15 wounded with the enemy 7 wounded brought back to Elgin and 59 taken prisoner. Other sources claim a larger number of government casualties. A Jacobite present at the battle admitted 14 dead, and a government officer estimated that the rebels had lost 30 to 40 dead.

An account of MacLeod's actions are given in the contemporary Culloden Papers:

McKlaudes Resolute Behavior in running to the Enemy with so few of his men about him and the stand they made with not one half of their little army against 900 till they were overpowered by numbers is much to his honour.

== Aftermath ==
About fifty of MacLeod's men were taken prisoner, several of whom were officers including the younger son of Gordon of Ardoch and Forbes of Echt. Also taken prisoner were John Chalmers, formerly principal and professor of King's College, Aberdeen, and Malcolm MacCrimmon, a member of the distinguished family of pipers. The remainder, including MacLeod himself, retreated to their own country.
