= 75th Regiment of Foot (1758) =

- Active: 28 April 1758
- Disbanded: 29 August 1763
- Country: Great Britain
- Branch: Infantry
- Type: Regiment

The 75th Regiment of Foot was an infantry regiment of the British Army from 1758 to 1763.

It was formed on 28 April 1758 from the 2nd Battalion of the 37th Regiment of Foot and placed under the command of Maj-Gen. the Honourable John Boscawen. After taking part in the capture of Belle Isle off the French coast they were redeployed to the West Indies, returning via Lisbon in 1762 for service on the Iberian Peninsula.

The regiment was disbanded on 29 August 1763.

== Regimental Colonels ==
- 1758–1762: Maj-Gen. Hon. John Boscawen
- 1762–1763: Gen. Marisco Frederick
