= George Munro, 1st of Culcairn =

Scottish soldier

- Died: 1746
- Relatives: Sir Robert Munro, 5th Baronet (father); Sir Robert Munro, 6th Baronet (brother); Sir Harry Munro, 7th Baronet (nephew)
- Military career
- Allegiance: British
- Rank: Captain
- Units: Black Watch, 42nd Highlanders
- Conflicts: Battle of Glen Shiel (WIA); Battle of Inverurie (1745); Raids on Lochaber and Shiramore

Sir George Munro of Culcairn (1685 – 1746) was a Scottish soldier of the 18th century from Ross-shire, Scotland. He commanded the 3rd Independent Highland Company from 1714 to 1716, fought at the Battle of Glen Shiel in 1719, led the 6th Company in formation of the "Black Watch" in 1725, the 8th Company of Black Watch when it was regimented in 1739 and again commanded an Independent Highland Company in 1745–1746. He was shot in error in 1746.

== Lineage ==
George Munro of Culcairn was born on 18 September 1685, the second son of Sir Robert Munro, 5th Baronet of Foulis, chief of the Clan Munro, who was also known as the Blind Baron. George's elder brother was Sir Robert Munro, 6th Baronet of Foulis, the next successive chief of the clan.

== Jacobite rising of 1715 ==
During the Jacobite rising of 1715 the Mackenzie Jacobite garrison at Inverness surrendered to Simon Fraser, 11th Lord Lovat upon the very day when the Battle of Sheriffmuir was fought and another Jacobite force was defeated at the Battle of Preston (1715). Soon after this 31-year-old Colonel Sir Robert Munro of Foulis marched into the town of Inverness with 400 Munros and took over control as governor from Fraser. Government troops arrived in Inverness towards the end of February, and for some months the process of disarming the rebels went on led by a Munro detachment under George Munro of Culcairn.

== Jacobite rising of 1719 ==
During the Jacobite rising of 1719, Captain George Munro of Culcairn led a detachment of Munros at the Battle of Glen Shiel where they helped to defeat the Jacobites. During the battle George who was wounded was shielded by his servant, however he told his men to carry on and not to shield him. The Jacobites continued to fire at George after he was down, until Sergeant Robert Munro, son of Hugh Munro of Tullochue, with a small party, dislodged Captain George Munro's assailants, after having previously swore upon his dirk that he would effect his rescue. The Jacobites were soon put into retreat and after the battle the Jacobite rising was over. Historian Peter Simpson states that the Munro company ably led by George Munro of Culcairn took a very positive part in the fighting and that their bold action helped in the defeat of the Jacobites under the Earl Marischall. Simpson also states that the battle raged for three hours but the superior power of the Government grenadiers along with the aggressive forays of the Munros won the day for the Government.

== Formation of the Black Watch and War in France ==
In 1725 six Independent Highland Companies were formed. One of Munros, one of Frasers, one of Grants and three of Campbells. George Munro of Culcairn was made a Captain in Munro's company under his elder brother Colonel Sir Robert. In 1739 ten Independent Highland Companies were embodied into a regiment of the line. The regiment then was officially known as the 43rd Highlanders (later renumbered the 42nd and also known as the "Black Watch" ). The regiment's first action together came at the Battle of Fontenoy in 1745 against the French, however George Munro of Culcairn had retired from the regiment in 1744.

== Jacobite rising of 1745 ==
During the Jacobite rising of 1745 the Munros continued their support for the British Government. George Munro was appointed the command of the Munro Independent Highland Company. While his elder brother, Robert Munro, now the chief of the clan was appointed command of the English 37th Regiment of Foot and Robert's son, Sir Harry Munro, 7th Baronet held command in Loudon's Highlanders regiment.

General Sir John Cope arrived at Inverness on 29 August 1745. George Munro of Culcairn met him and agreed that the Munros "should instantly take arms and join the King's troops".

Harry Munro joined Sir John Cope at the Water of Nairn and when the army marched for Aberdeen on 4 September Loudon's Highlanders regiment included his three companies, while George Munro of Culcairn's detachment acted as scouts. Sir John Cope remained in Aberdeen where a fourth company of Loudoun's regiment joined the others until 14 September from whence they sailed to Dunbar and their infamous defeat at the Battle of Prestonpans. Harry was among 70 officers taken prisoner and for a time was imprisoned in Glamis Castle but by mid January 1746 he was among 31 men released who arrived at Edinburgh, where he learnt the tragic news of his father Robert's and his uncle Duncan's deaths after the Battle of Falkirk Muir.

Meanwhile, the main body of 200 Munros, having escorted Sir John Cope successfully to Aberdeen had returned to the north under George Munro of Culcairn and were not present at Prestonpans. However, George Munro and his Independent Company seem to have been involved in the events which led up to the Battle of Inverurie (1745) if not involved in the battle itself. One account does state that the Munros under George Munro of Culcairn were positioned in such a way that they were able to attack the advancing Jacobites from the front and flank leaving many dead on the field. Another account states that the Munros held position at the village of Oldmeldrum and were not involved in the battle at all.

John Campbell, 4th Earl of Loudoun and Sir John Cope had escaped by sea to London after the Battle of Prestonpans from whence Loudoun later returned north to Inverness to take command in the north but was forced with Duncan Forbes, Lord Culloden and George Munro of Culcairn to withdraw through the Black Isle into Ross-shire being pressed by a much larger Jacobite force. According to historian Ruairidh MacLeod, at this time George Munro of Culcairn was the most experienced military man in the north.

After the Battle of Falkirk (1746), Mackenzie Jacobites had burned Foulis Castle leaving it a semi ruin. In April of that year the Jacobite army was finally defeated at the Battle of Culloden by Government forces but although Loudon's regiment were present Harry Munro was listed as missing on leave and George Munro of Culcairn had already returned north.

== Assassination ==
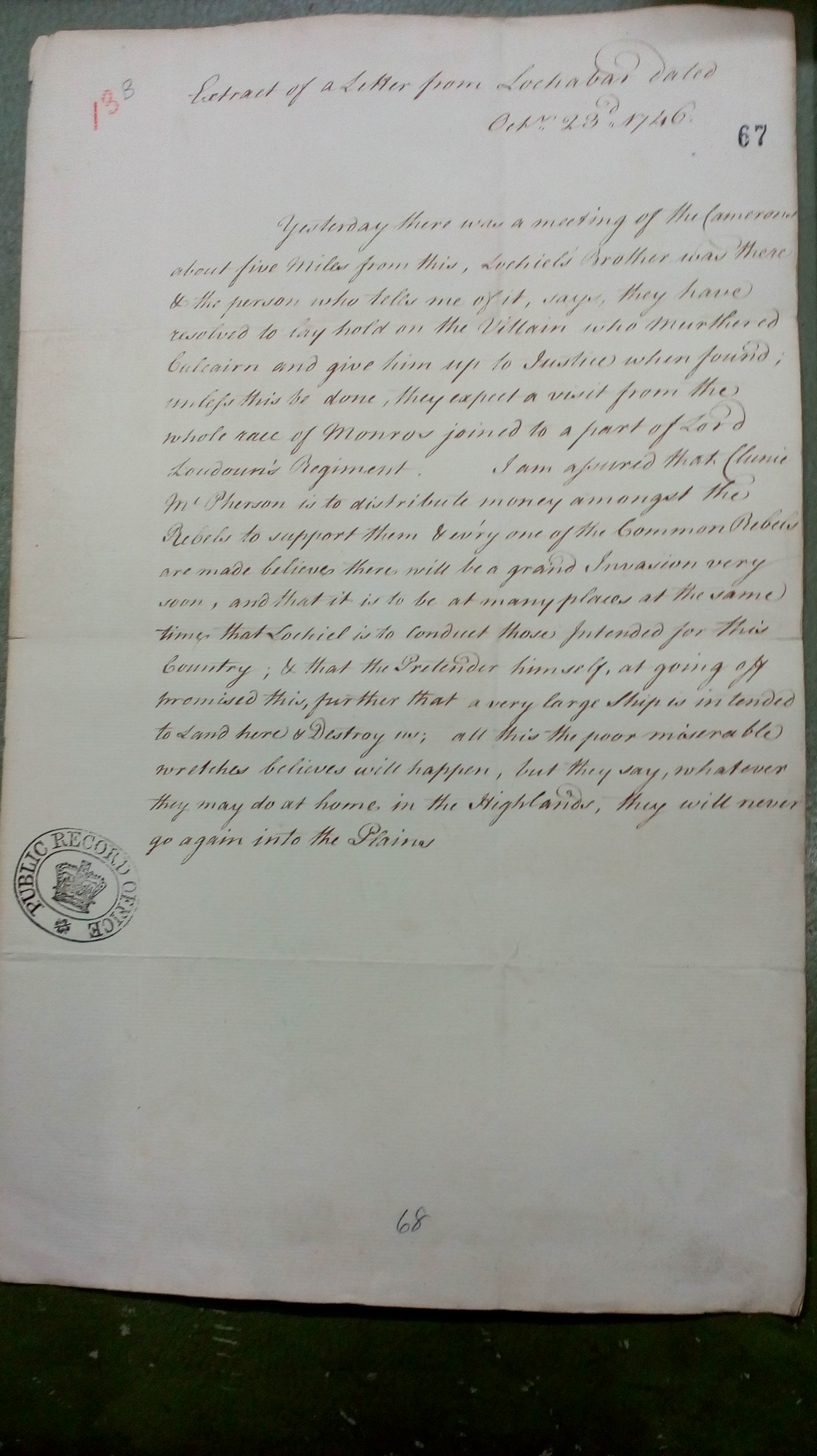
Letter to Lord Albemarle dated 23 October 1746 that reads Yesterday there was a meeting of the Camerons about five miles from this, Lochiel's brother was there & the person who tells me of it says, they have resolved to lay hold on the villain who murdered (George Munro of) Culcairn and give him up to the Justice when found, unless this be done they expect a visit from the whole race of Monros (Munros).

After the Jacobite rising had been suppressed a Munro Independent Company under Harry Munro of Foulis and the command of his uncle, George Munro of Culcairn continued to police the Highlands. George Munro and his Independent Company burned Achnacarry Castle, which was the seat of the Clan Cameron, watched by Donald Cameron of Lochiel, chief of the Clan Cameron. The Camerons had been the most staunch of Jacobites and were also responsible for the murder of George's elder brother Sir Robert Munro, 6th Baronet after the Battle of Falkirk Muir.

Around the same time that Achnacarry Castle was burned a Government officer from the Clan Grant, seized a young man by the name of Cameron, who had been sent by his father, Dugald Roy Cameron, to Fort William to surrender their arms. Grant shot the young Cameron on the spot. The young Cameron's father swore to be revenged on what had happened to his son and had heard that Grant rode a white horse and waited for him behind a rock on his return from Loch Arkaig. Captain George Munro of Culcairn had borrowed Grant's horse and as a result was shot and killed in mistake for him by Cameron.

Some information on George Munro of Culcairn's murder is given by historian Ruairidh MacLeod. MacLeod states that on 19 August, Lord Loudon (John Campbell, 4th Earl of Loudoun) ordered Munro to sweep through Knoydart and into Lochaber. On 31 August, Munro's four companies met up with Captain Grant's detachment at Locharkaigside where Munro was killed. The Reverend John Cameron maintained that Munro was shot in mistake for Captain Grant of Knockando, in revenge by the father of a man killed on the orders of Grant. Lord Albemarle reported that the murderer of Culcairn was John Roy McFie who was frequently called John Roy Cameron and who lived at Auchinsoul on North Arkaigside. The MacGillonies (who were a branch or sept of Clan Cameron), later delivered up a suspect called Evan Bane as a scapegoat, Lord Loudoun reacted angrily ordering Cameron of Fassefern to find the right man within ten days.

Underground Roman Catholic Bishop John Geddes believed Munro's death to have been a deliberate act by a disgruntled enlisted man, whom Captain Grant had recently had flogged. The Bishop also believed that Captain Munro's death was divine retribution for his personal involvement in the recent desecration and church arson of a nearby Roman Catholic chapel and others like it throughout Cameron country.

Another suspect was the Jacobite Grant of Moy whose lands had been burnt and plundered by George Munro of Culcairn. Grant of Moy had been walking along the road with a gun when Munro of Culcairn was shot, but a turn in the road concealed him from the soldiers when the shot was fired. He was immediately seized under suspicion by the soldiers and taken to Fort William, but later released. Grant of Moy later joined the 42nd Regiment of Foot as a volunteer soldier of fortune and afterwards got a cadet-ship in India, returning with a handsome fortune.

== Family ==
George's son, John Munro, 2nd of Culcairn is also well remembered for the unusual hospitality he showed to a Jacobite Bishop in the 1760s. It is recorded how John Munro of Culcairn treated him to the best of Strong Ale, Claret of Vintage 49 and good Coffee made of his own Wheat. The Bishop also described Culcairn's improvements: his grounds produce the best of Wheat and he has erected a Flour-Miln for dressing it.

== Independent Company ==
Amongst the men in George Munro of Culcairn's independent company who supported the British Government during the 1745 - 1746 Jacobite rising were:

- Hugh Munro (of Achany) (Ensign)
- Robert Munro (sergeant)
- Hugh Munro (sergeant)
- Hugh Munro (of Ardullie) (sergeant)
- George Ross (sergeant)
- Charles Munro (corporal)
- David Munro (corporal)
- Robert Grant (corporal)
- Duncan Douglas (corporal)
- Robert Munro (in Wester Foulis) (surgeon)
- Donald Mackay (drummer)
- Alexander Munro (in Katwall) (soldier)
- Alexander Munro (in Nafaid in Ffyrish) (soldier)
- Alexander Munro Bain (in Katwall) (soldier)
- Alexander Munro (in Alness) (soldier)
- Alexander Munro (Miller in Drummond) (soldier)
- Alexander Munro (in Kildermory) (soldier)
- Alexander McGilichallum Munro (in Milntown) (soldier)
- Andrew Munro Turner (in Kildermory) (soldier)
- Donald Munro Baine (in Auchany) (soldier)
- Donald Munro Bain (in Drummond) (soldier)
- Donald Munro (in Brigend) (soldier)
- Donald Munro (in Dalbreak) (soldier)
- Donald Grassich Munro (in Kiltearn) (soldier)
- Donald Munro (in Kildermory) (soldier)
- Donald Munro (in Katwell) (soldier)
- Donald Munro (in Teanaird - the younger) (soldier)
- Donald Munro (in Teanaird - the elder) (soldier)
- Donald Munro (in Ribbigill) (soldier)
- Donald Munro (in Farr) (soldier)
- Donald McFinlay Roy Munro (in Teanich) (soldier)
- Donald Munro (in Druminloy) (soldier)
- Donald McCallie Munro (in Drummond) (soldier)
- George McGillichallum Munro (in Foulis (Ffowlis) (soldier)
- George Munro (in Obsdale (soldier)
- George Munro (in Newton) (soldier)
- George Munro (in Auchany) (soldier)
- Hector Oig Munro (in Bognahavine) (soldier)
- Hugh Munro (in Auchnacullan) (soldier)
- Hugh Munro (in Kydoich) (soldier)
- Hugh Callanach Munro (in Foulis (Ffowlis) (soldier)
- John Allanson Munro (in Newtown) (soldier)
- John Ballach Munro (in Culcairn) (soldier)
- John Munro Bain (in Balblair) (soldier)
- John McFarquhar Munro (in Wester Foulis) (soldier)
- John Naffaid Munro (in Teanriven) (soldier)
- John McGillispick Munro (soldier)
- John Allanson Munro (in Newtown) (soldier)
- Niel Ballach Munro (in Wester Foulis (Ffowlis) (soldier)
- Robert Munro (in Rufaqr) (soldier)
- Robert Munro Bain (in Newtown) (soldier)
- Robert Macangus Munro (in Katwall) (soldier)
- Roderick Munro (in Culcraggie) (soldier)
- Ronald Munro (in Swardell) (soldier)
- William Munro (in Obsdale - the elder) (soldier)
- William Munro (in Obsdale - the younger) (soldier)
- William Munro (in Balchastle) (soldier)
- William Munro (miller in Mulinuoran) (soldier)
- William McGilichallum Munro (in Balcony) (soldier)
- William Buy Munro (in Contrillich) (soldier)
- William Munro (in Drummond, Easter Ross) (soldier)
- William Munro (in Plaids) (soldier)
- William McRikan Munro (in Teanriven) (soldier)
- Donald Mackay (in Auchany) (soldier)
- Alexander Mackay (in Pitfuir) (soldier)
- John Mackay (in Clunell) (soldier)
- Robert Mackay (in Clunell (soldier)
- William Mackay (in Pitfuir) (soldier)
- William Mackay (in Ffowlis) (soldier)
- Duncan MacLean (in Milntown) (soldier)
- William MacLean (in Dibidill) (soldier)
- Donald McLeod (in Plaid) (soldier)
- John McLeod (in Bunrod) (soldier)
- Angus Mcpherson (in Novar) (soldier)
- Donald Mcurchie (in Ardoch) (soldier)
- James Cameron (soldier)
- Evan Cameron (in Kiltearn) (soldier)
- Roderick Campbell (in Alness) (soldier)
- William Campbell (in Cowie) (soldier)
- Donald Davie (soldier)
- John Ferguson (soldier)
- Simon Gray (in Pitarksie)(soldier)
- Donald Hossack (in Obsdale) (soldier)
- John Leslie (in Pitarksie) (soldier)
- Alexander McDonald (in Pitfuir) (soldier)
- Duncan McDonald (in Salchie) (soldier)
- Thomas MacDonald (in Pitarskie)
- William McDonald (soldier)
- William McDonald (elder in Pitfuir) (soldier)
- William McDonald Yor (in Pitfuir)
- John McEvan (in Polisky) (soldier)
- John McIntosh (in Pitarskie) (soldier)
- James Oag Ross (in Alness) (soldier)
- John McGillichallum Ross (in Newtown) (soldier)
- Robert Ross (in Ardoch) (soldier)
- Alexander Sutherland (in Ardoch) (soldier)
- Robert Sutherland (in Balcherry) (soldier)
- Donald Thompson (in Culcairn) (soldier)
- Donald Urquhart (in Culbin) (soldier)
- George Urquhart (in Alness) (soldier)
- John Urquhart (in Clunell) (soldier)
- William Urquhart (in Ardoch)
- Alexander Wallace (in Dal Break) (soldier)
- Alexander Williamson (soldier)

== See also ==
- Raids on Lochaber and Shiramore
- Munro of Culcairn

== Bibliography ==
- Fraser, C.I. of Reelig (1954). The Clan Munro. Stirling: Johnston & Bacon. ISBN 0-7179-4535-9.
- Mackenzie, Alexander (1898). History of the Munros of Fowlis. Inverness: Scottish Highlander Office.
- MacLeod, Ruairidh. H. F.S.A. Scot (1984). Transactions of the Gaelic Society of Inverness. Vol. LIII.
- Munro, R.W (1977). Clan Munro Magazine. Vol. 14.
- Simpson, Peter (1996). The Independent Highland Companies, 1603 - 1760. Edinburgh: John Donald Publishers. ISBN 0-85976-432-X.
