= Sir Robert Munro, 5th Baronet =

Chief of the Clan Munro

Sir Robert Munro, 5th Baronet of Foulis (died 11 September 1729) was also 23rd Baron and 26th chief of the Clan Munro. He became blind and was known as the Blind Baron.

== Member of Parliament ==
Robert Munro was the eldest son of Sir John Munro, 4th Baronet of Foulis. Robert was granted a charter by William III of Great Britain for confirmation of the lands and barony of Foulis, as well as all of his other estates. Robert represented the County of Ross in Parliament from 1697 to 1702. Sir Robert along with many other Munros is amongst the people of Sutherland and Ross who signed an address to George I of Great Britain, in December 1714, imploring his Royal mercy for Simon Fraser, 11th Lord Lovat, chief of the Clan Fraser of Lovat, on his return from France at the instigation of James Fraser of Castle Leathers.

== 1715 Jacobite rising ==
During the Jacobite rising of 1715, William Mackenzie, 5th Earl of Seaforth led a force of 3000 men which included men from the Clan Mackenzie, Clan MacDonald, Clan Mackinnon, Clan Macrae and the Clan Chisholm. He was opposed by Robert's eldest son and heir, Sir Robert Munro, 6th Baronet who had formed a camp at the Bridge of Alness with 600 men which also included men from the Clan Ross. Munro had sent many of his own men south to protect the lands of Forbes of Culloden from the Jacobites. Munro was soon joined by John Gordon, 16th Earl of Sutherland and George Mackay, 3rd Lord Reay who both brought with them only a portion of their clans, amounting to 1800 in total, and expected support from the Clan Grant did not arrive. The Earl of Seaforth's forces advanced on the Sutherland's camp who made a quick retreat to avoid contact with their more powerful foe. Soon afterwards a council of war was held between the two sides and the Sutherlands and Mackays peacefully moved back north to their own territory, while much of the Ross's lands were ravaged and the Munros returned home to find their lands of Ferindonald and Foulis Castle had been plundered.

The Sutherlands and the Munros were not long in retaliating. Sir Robert Munro of Foulis and the Earl of Sutherland gathered their forces and spoiled Mackenzie, Earl of Seaforth's lands of Brahan.

From Major Fraser's manuscript:

The Earl of Sutherland that night, to be avenged on what was done to him at Alness, and the Munros, also to be revenged of what the Mackenzies and MacDonalds had plundered from them, did encamp near Lord Seaforth's house and there destroy what they could. Then a hundred Frasers and a hundred Munros were sent off to bring in provisions, there being 1500 men encamped that night, and every two men might have had a cow. Being about 400 cows and 200 sheep brought from the mountains.

== Sheriff of Ross ==
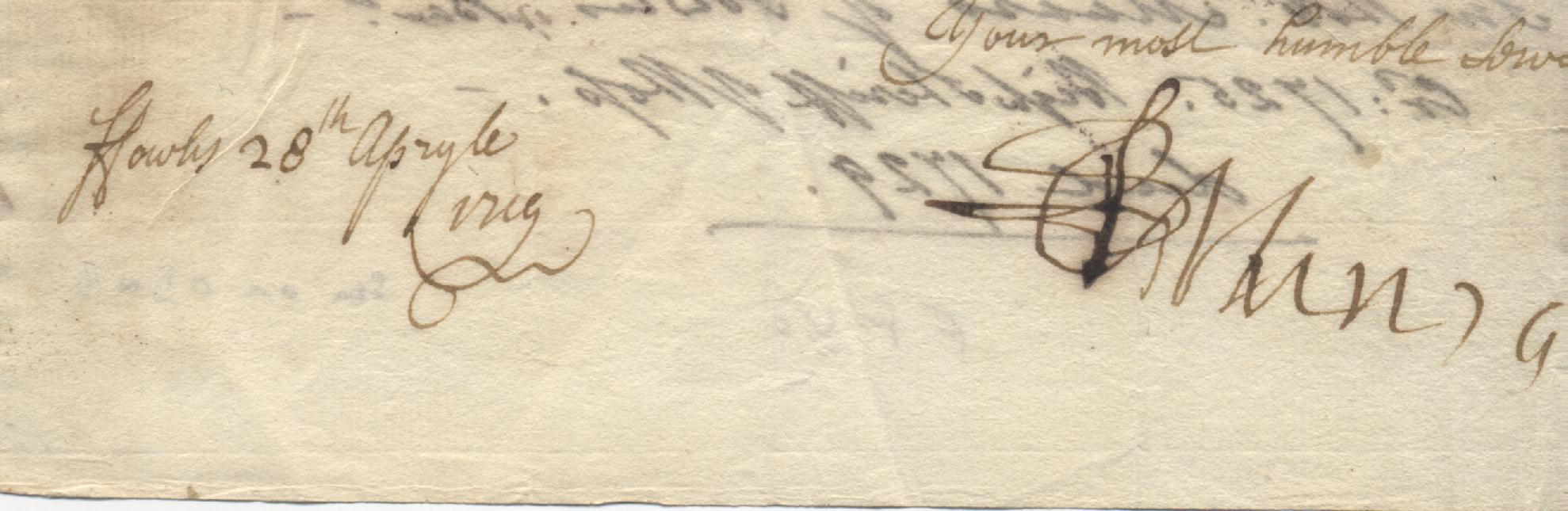
Signature of Sir Robert Munro, 5th Baronet in an agreement with the king in April 1719. Signed at Foulis (Fowlis)

Although blind, Robert was an able and intelligent man and was appointed by George I of Great Britain the Sheriff of Ross, by commission, under the great seal, dated 9 June 1725. During the risings of 1715 and 1719 his clan had done much to check the activities of the Mackenzies and other Jacobite clans. During Robert's lifetime his eldest son, Col. Robert helped bring to an end the Siege of Inverness (1715) and his second son, Cpt. George Munro of Culcairn led men of the clan at the Battle of Glen Shiel where they defeated the Jacobites in June 1719.

Robert Munro died in 1729. He had married Jean Forbes, the daughter of John Forbes of Culloden and they had four children:

1. Sir Robert Munro, 6th Baronet.
2. George Munro, 1st of Culcairn.
3. Dr Duncan Munro of Obsdale.
4. Ann Munro, m. Alexander Gordon of Ardoch (later Poyntzfield) in Resolis.

Baronetage of Nova Scotia
Preceded by John Munro	Baronet (of Foulis); 1697–1729	Succeeded by Robert Munro
