= Munro of Culrain =

The Munros of Culrain were a minor noble Scottish family and a cadet branch of the ancient Clan Munro, a Scottish clan of the Scottish Highlands. They were seated at Culrain which is in the south of the county of Sutherland, but to the north of the main Munro clan lands in Kiltearn, Easter Ross.

== History ==
George Munro, 1st of Culrain was the third son of George Munro, 1st of Newmore who himself was a royalist soldier of the 17th century and a cadet of the Munro of Obsdale family. The estate of Culrain was apparently named after Coleraine in Ireland of which George Munro, 1st of Newmore had been the governor. The Newmore estate had passed to the elder half-brother of George Munro, 1st of Culrain. The estate of Culrain later passed through several descendants until it was lost to Hector Munro, 8th laird of Novar. However, the landless representative of the Munro of Culrain family succeeded to the estate of Munro of Foulis in 1849, and also to the Baronetcy of Foulis when Charles Munro, 7th of Culrain became the 9th Baronet of Foulis upon the death of Sir Hugh Munro, 8th Baronet in May 1848, and his daughter who died eight months later.

According to the 19th-century historian Alexander Mackenzie, the Munro of Culrain family was able to succeed to the Baronetcy of Foulis and chiefship of the Clan Munro as there was no male representative of the Munro of Culcairn family, who were senior in line to succeed but who were apparently extinct in the male line.

== Lairds of Culrain ==
- George Munro, 1st of Culrain (d. 1724) (third son of George Munro, 1st of Newmore).
- George Munro, 2nd of Culrain (d. 1731).
- Gustavus Munro, 3rd of Culrain (d. 1751) (brother of George, 2nd of Culrain. Gustavus had a son called George who died before being served heir to his father. This George was a Lieutenant in the MacLeod of Assynt Independent Highland Company raised to oppose the Jacobite rising of 1745.)
- James Munro, 4th of Culrain (d. 1760) (brother of Gustavus, 3rd of Culrain)
- Charles Munro, 5th of Culrain (d. 1782)
- George Munro, 6th of Culrain (d. 1845)
- Charles Munro, 7th of Culrain and 9th Baronet of Foulis (succeeded in 1849 to the Baronetcy).
- See Munro baronets for further generations.

== See also ==
- Munro baronets
- Chiefs of Clan Munro
- Clan Munro
- Scottish clan
