= Sutherland, Ross and Cromarty (Commonwealth Parliament constituency) =

- Former constituency for the Protectorate Parliament
- Region: Scotland

Former constituency
- Created: 1654
- Abolished: 1659
- Created from: Scotland
- Replaced by: Sutherland; Ross; Cromarty

During the Commonwealth of England, Scotland and Ireland, called the Protectorate, the Scottish sheriffdoms of Sutherland, Ross and Cromarty were jointly represented by one Member of Parliament in the House of Commons at Westminster from 1654 until 1659.

== List of Members of Parliament ==
Parliament	Dates	Name
First Protectorate Parliament	3 September 1654 – 22 January 1655	vacant?
Second Protectorate Parliament	17 September 1656 – 4 February 1658	Dr Thomas Clarges
Third Protectorate Parliament	27 January 1659 – 22 April 1659	Ralph Knight
