= Ross-shire (Parliament of Scotland constituency) =

Constituency of the old Parliament of the Kingdom of Scotland

Before the Acts of Union 1707, the barons of the shire of Ross elected commissioners to represent them in the unicameral Parliament of Scotland and in the Convention of the Estates.

From 1708 Ross-shire was represented by one Member of Parliament in the House of Commons of Great Britain.

== List of shire commissioners ==
- 1649–50: Robert Munro of Obsdaill

During the Commonwealth of England, Scotland and Ireland, the sheriffdoms of Sutherland, Ross and Cromarty were jointly represented by one Member of Parliament in the Protectorate Parliament at Westminster. After the Restoration, the Parliament of Scotland was again summoned to meet in Edinburgh.

- 1661–63, 1685, 1689–93: Sir George Munro of Culraine and Newmore (died 1693)
- 1661–63, 1678 (convention), 1681–82, 1685: Sir George Mackenzie of Tarbat and Cromarty
- 1665 convention: John Mackenzie of Inverlawell
- 1669–74: David Ross of Balnagown
- 1669–74: Sir George Mackenzie of Rosehaugh
- 1678 (convention), 1681–82: Sir Roderick Mackenzie of Findone
- 1685–86: Sir Donald Bayne of Tulloch
- 1689–97: Sir John Munro of Foulis (died 1697)
- 1693–1702: Sir Alexander Mackenzie of Coul
- 1697–1701: Sir Robert Munro of Foulis
- 1702–07: Sir Kenneth Mackenzie of Scatwell
- 1702–04: Sir Kenneth Mackenzie of Gairloch (died 1704)
- 1704–07: George Mackenzie of Cromarty and Grandvale

== See also ==
- List of constituencies in the Parliament of Scotland at the time of the Union
