= Dornoch (Parliament of Scotland constituency) =

Constituency of the Old Parliament of Scotland in Highland, Scotland

Dornoch in Sutherland was a royal burgh that returned one commissioner to the Parliament of Scotland and to the Convention of Estates.

After the Acts of Union 1707, Dornoch, Dingwall, Kirkwall, Tain and Wick formed the Tain district of burghs, returning one member between them to the House of Commons of Great Britain.

== List of burgh commissioners ==
- 1661: Alexander Gordon
- 1685–86, 1689 (convention), 1689–90: Captain George Gordon (died c.1692)
- 1692–1702: John Anderson the younger of Westertoun
- 1702–07: John Urquhart of Meldrum

== See also ==
- List of constituencies in the Parliament of Scotland at the time of the Union
