= Tain (Parliament of Scotland constituency) =

Constituency of the Parliament of Scotland

Tain in Ross-shire was a burgh constituency that elected one commissioner to the Parliament of Scotland and to the Convention of Estates.

After the Acts of Union 1707, Tain, Dingwall, Dornoch, Kirkwall and Wick formed the Tain district of burghs, returning one member between them to the House of Commons of Great Britain.

== List of burgh commissioners ==
- 1661–63: Andrew Roe
- 1665 convention, 1669–70: Walter Ross, bailie
- 1672–74: Alexander Forrester of Edertaine, provost
- 1667 convention, 1678 convention, 1681–82, 1685–86: John Forrester, former bailie
- 1689 convention, 1689–1702: William Ross the younger of Easterfern
- 1702–07: Captain Daniel MacLeod

== See also ==
- List of constituencies in the Parliament of Scotland at the time of the Union
