= Cromarty (Parliament of Scotland constituency) =

Cromarty was a royal burgh that returned one commissioner to the Parliament of Scotland and to the Convention of Estates.

A royal burgh since 1264, Cromarty had a new charter on 4 July 1593, but this was not enrolled by Parliament until 1661. The right of representation was relinquished in 1672.

== List of burgh commissioners ==
- 1661–63: Alexander Clunes
- 1665 convention: Alexander Gibson
- 1667 convention: no representation
- 1669–70: Thomas Urquhart
- 1672: representation relinquished

== See also ==
- Cromartyshire (Parliament of Scotland constituency)
