= Russell Cromarty =

Australian rules footballer

Personal information
- Full name: Russell Cromarty
- Born: 11 June 1947 (age 79)
- Original team: Boronia
- Height: 183 cm (6 ft 0 in)
- Weight: 76 kg (168 lb)

Playing career^{1}
Years	Club	Games (Goals)
1966–67	Fitzroy	18 (25)
- ^{1} Playing statistics correct to the end of 1967.

Russell Cromarty (born 11 June 1947) is a former Australian rules footballer who played with Fitzroy in the Victorian Football League (VFL).
