= Sir John Munro, 4th Baronet =

Sir John Munro, 4th Baronet of Foulis (died c. September 1697), 22nd Baron and 25th chief of the Clan Munro, was such a strenuous supporter of Presbyterianism, that, being of a large frame, he was known as "the Presbyterian mortar-piece."

== Career ==
In the Stuart persecutions, previous to his succession to the title, he had for his adherence to the covenant, been both fined and imprisoned by the tyrannical government that then ruled Scotland. As John Munro had been fined and imprisoned as a Covenanter, at the Glorious Revolution he naturally took the side of William of Orange.

In 1661, by a deed dated 23 January, John entered into a bond of friendship and manrent with Kenneth Mor Mackenzie, 3rd Earl of Seaforth, chief of Mackenzies. They became bound to each other for themselves and for their friends to live as good neighbours and to assist and defend each other.

John is also mentioned in a minute of agreement between George Sinclair, Earl of Caithness and George Gordon, Lord Strathnaver who later became the 15th Earl of Sutherland, dated 7 December 1668, as one of the Earl of Cathness's and Earl of Argyll's 'Deputies' in the Sheriffship and Justiciary. The other Deputes are Lord Strathnaver himself, Ross of Balnagowan and Sir George Munro of Glenurquhie.

From 1689 to 1695 he represented Ross-shire as a shire commissioner in the Parliament of Scotland, succeeded in the role by his son Robert.

== Personal life ==
John married Agnes, daughter of Sir Kenneth Mackenzie, 3rd Earl of Seaforth chief of the Clan Mackenzie. Together, they had six children:

- Sir Robert Munro, 5th Baronet of Foulis, (the Blind Baron). John's heir and successor.
- Cpt. Andrew Munro.
- Jane Munro.
- Christian Munro.
- Anne Munro.
- Margaret Munro.

Sir John died in September 1697.

== See also ==
- Munro baronets
- Clan Munro

== External links and references ==
Baronetage of Nova Scotia
Preceded by Robert Munro	Baronet (of Foulis); 1668–1697	Succeeded by Robert Munro
