= James H. Cromartie =

American artist

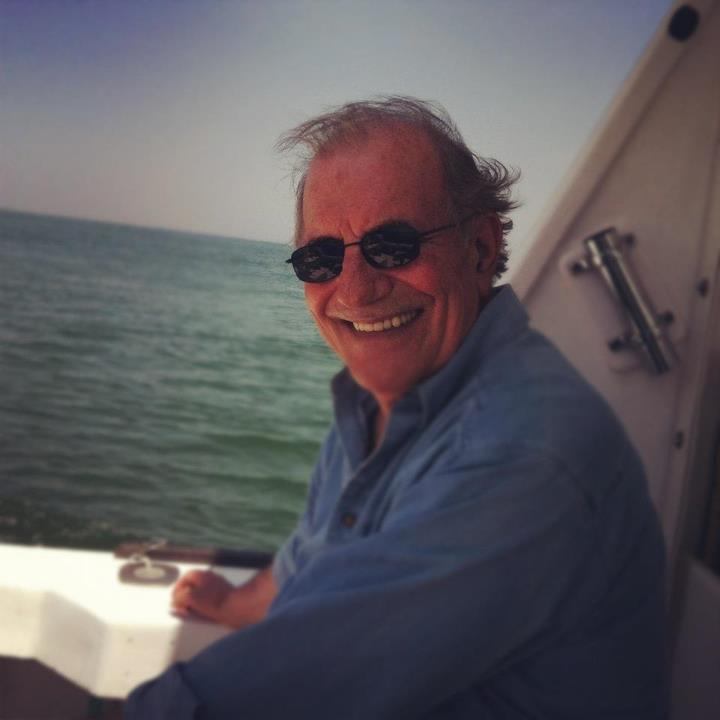
- Cromartie in 2012
- Born: James H. Cromartie; May 3, 1944 (age 81); North Carolina, US
- Died: March 31, 2026
- Education: East Carolina University
- Known for: Painting
- Movement: Hard-Edge Realism
- Website: cromartiegallery.com/index.php

James H. Cromartie is an American artist credited with the birth of Hard-Edge Realism, a style by turns both redolent of and a departure from the Magic realism pioneered by Andrew Wyeth. The list of celebrities and wealthy patrons reported to be among his collectors is extensive and examples of Cromartie's work may be found in 125 countries across the globe. Domestically, Cromartie has been called, "one of America's leading historical artists," for his commissioned portraits of the White House, Smithsonian Institution, U.S Capitol and Supreme Court, among others. In 2005, James H. Cromartie's historical portrait of the White House was featured in the widely distributed art history textbook, ArtTalk, a distinction granted to a mere 25 living artists globally. Cromartie has resided year-round on Nantucket, Massachusetts for over 35 years, proudly quipping, "there are Nantucket artists, but then again there are…artists who have chosen to live on Nantucket. There's a b-i-g difference."

== Early life ==
James H. Cromartie was born into one of North Carolina’s oldest and most prominent families, initially possessing over one-tenth of the state's entire territory. Despite the ease with which he could have obtained a career in civil service given his family’s numerous political connections, a young Jim found himself inexorably drawn to the world of fine art, relishing, in particular, the renowned realist artists, Andrew Wyeth and Edward Hopper. Cromartie remembers, “They had a small bookstore in the museum…as a young third and fourth grade child I would steal those little books from the Mint Museum. Well I didn't actually steal them all, I would buy one and take three, but I guess that's the same thing." Inspired by these canonical works, but only able to view the bookstore's reproductions, Jim would later inadvertently pioneer a style that would be uniquely his own, Hard-Edge Realism. First, however, an important patron was fated to enter the life of the young artist, James H. Cromartie.

== Rockefeller patronage ==
Late in the summer of 1969, Nelson and Happy Rockefeller paid a visit to James H. Cromartie's gallery on Nantucket. They bought two paintings that day for 600 dollars apiece. Jim remembers, “word spread across Old South Wharf and, then, across the entire town like a wildfire. ‘The Rockefellers only bought two paintings while they were on the island and they both were Jim Cromartie’s.’”

The following summer Nelson Rockefeller returned to Cromartie’s gallery with longtime friend and college chum, Roger Firestone. They proceeded to buy every Cromartie in the gallery and would later promise their continued patronage indefinitely until James H. Cromartie fully realized what would soon become his signature note, Hard-Edge Realism. Cromartie recalls, “it was like somebody put me on a rocket and my work just took off.”

== The birth of Hard-Edge Realism ==
Early in his career, James H. Cromartie reports to have often surveyed the printed works of Andrew Wyeth for hours on end attempting to decode a technique so seamless it did not even bear the stroke of a brush. It would be years before Cromartie, confident that he had finally mastered Wyeth's technique, actually stood in front of an original Wyeth only to find the canvas, so immaculately rendered in his books, covered in brush strokes. Thus, in simply attempting to emulate Andrew Wyeth, James H. Cromartie inadvertently spawned Hard-Edge Realism, “launching him on a journey that would take him around the world and into the company of many of society’s elite.” James H. Cromartie, himself, while accepting the popular use of the term, Hard-Edge Realism, believes his style to be more correctly stated as “surrealistic impressionism.” Cromartie, describes his work in Nantucket Portrait: Fun & Games with the Super Rich the Birth of Hard-Edge Realism thus,

                   “if you compare a photograph with my paintings you would see a great 
                    difference. My lighting is better than real life. My composition is better 
                    than real life. I add things to the painting that might not actually be there 
                    if you took a photograph. Sometimes I leave things out that are there. My  
                    paintings have emotion and feeling in them that cannot be captured on film."[19]

== Work as a historical artist ==
James H. Cromartie's body of work includes commissioned historical portraits of the Smithsonian, Capitol, White House, and U.S. Supreme Court. The first of these commissions came in 1985 by personal request from the Smithsonian curator’s daughter, Sharon Boyd, to paint its iconic original building, The Castle. Prints of James H. Cromartie’s portrait of The Castle are today presented as gifts to visiting foreign dignitaries. Following the success of the Smithsonian portrait, Cromartie received a second commission to paint the U.S. Capitol from its eponymous Historical Society. At the unveiling, Senator Sam Nunn chided Cromartie for leaving out the flag over the domed Capitol; in response, Cromartie quickly proceeded to paint the flag right where Nunn stood. Former Speaker of the House, Newt Gingrich personally thanked Cromartie for the portrait in a letter calling it, "an exceptional and truly beautiful work of art." Perhaps the most personal of all James H. Cromartie's historical commissions was that which he received to paint the official portrait of the White House, as Cromartie's fourth great-grandfather, James Hoban, designed it. The portrait was personally received by President Ronald Reagan and would later be chosen, along with Cromartie's portrait of the Capitol, by the U.S. State Department to feature prominently in the U.S. Embassy in Moscow. James H. Cromartie's latest commissioned historical portrait of the U.S. Supreme Court rounded out his career as "one of America's leading historical artists," and is thus affectionately referred to by him as the “third jewel.”

== Reception ==
James H. Cromartie's oeuvre has enjoyed a warm reception both critically and commercially. Kirk M. Crist of the Naples Daily News recognized Cromartie early on as being, "truly on the threshold of one of the most brilliant art careers this country has ever known." Paul Chelko, former art critic for the Atlanta Journal, effusively praised Cromartie's work, writing, "brilliance cannot be defined, nor genius denied, it is all here…what Grant Wood, Edward Hopper, Andrew Wyeth, and many others have done, artistic evolution it seems, has granted us something more." James H. Cromartie has amassed a number of celebrity collectors to date including Tom Brokaw, Roger Firestone, Princess Diana, Steve Forbes, Nelson Rockefeller, and Robert Duvall.
