= Tain Burghs (UK Parliament constituency) =

Parliamentary constituency in the United Kingdom, 1801–1832

- Former district of Burghs constituency for the House of Commons
- Major settlements: Dingwall, Dornoch, Kirkwall, Tain, Wick

1708–1832
- Seats: One
- Created from: Dingwall, Dornoch, Kirkwall, Tain, Wick
- Replaced by: Wick Burghs

Tain Burghs was a constituency of the House of Commons of the Parliament of Great Britain from 1708 to 1801 and of the Parliament of the United Kingdom from 1801 to 1832, sometimes known as Northern Burghs. It was represented by one Member of Parliament (MP).

== Creation ==
The British parliamentary constituency was created in 1708 following the Acts of Union, 1707 and replaced the former Parliament of Scotland burgh constituencies of Tain, Dingwall, Dornoch, Kirkwall and Wick which had all been separately represented with one commissioner each in the former Parliament of Scotland. In 1707-08, members of the 1702-1707 Parliament of Scotland were co-opted to serve in the first Parliament of Great Britain. See Scottish representatives to the 1st Parliament of Great Britain, for further details.

== Boundaries ==
The constituency was a district of burghs representing the Royal burghs of Dingwall, Dornoch, Kirkwall, Tain and Wick.

In 1832 the constituency was replaced by Wick Burghs and Cromarty was added to the district.

== History ==
The constituency elected one Member of Parliament (MP) by the first past the post system until the seat was abolished for the 1832 general election.

The first Member of Parliament (MP), for the five Burghs, was elected at Tain in 1708. Lord Strathnaver was the eldest son of a Scottish peer. He would not have been eligible to be elected to the Parliament of Scotland. It was disputed that Strathnaver was eligible to be elected to the Parliament of Great Britain, as the representative of a Scottish seat.

On 3 December 1708, the House of Commons decided the issue, as at that time the House judged the eligibility of its members itself rather than leaving the issue to be decided by a Judge.

After the House called in counsel, the election petitions and representations in writing were read out and the lawyers put forward arguments for their clients. After counsel had withdrawn a question was formulated and put to a vote.

The proposition the House voted on was "that the eldest sons of the Peers of Scotland were capable by the Laws of Scotland at the time of the Union, to elect or be elected as Commissioners for the Shire or Boroughs [sic, see Burghs] to the Parliament of Scotland; and therefore by the Treaty of Union are capable to elect, or be elected to represent any Shire or Borough [sic] in Scotland, to sit in the House of Commons of Great Britain".

The House rejected the motion and so declared that Lord Strathnaver was ineligible to be elected an MP for Tain Burghs.

The most prominent English political figure, to represent a Scottish constituency in the 18th century, was Charles James Fox. In the 1784 general election, Fox sought re-election for the Westminster constituency. Political opponents challenged Fox's election. As Westminster had the largest electorate of any English borough, the scrutiny of votes (to check that each voter had been legally qualified to participate in the election) was thought likely to take a long time. To avoid Fox being out of Parliament, until the Westminster election petition was decided, a Scottish friend arranged for him to become member for Tain Burghs.

It took until 1786 for Fox to be confirmed as a duly elected MP for Westminster. Fox then chose to represent his English constituency and the Scottish one became vacant.

== Members of Parliament ==
Elected	Member	Party
1708	Lord Strathnaver	
1709 by-election	Robert Douglas	
1710	Sir Robert Munro, Bt	Whig
1741	Charles Erskine	
1742 by-election	Robert Craigie	
1747	Sir Harry Munro, Bt	Whig
1761	John Scott	
1768	Hon. Alexander Mackay	
1773 by-election	James Grant	
1780	Charles Ross	Whig (Foxite)
1784	Charles James Fox	Whig (Foxite)
1786 by-election	George Ross	Whig (Foxite)
1786 by-election	Sir Charles Lockhart-Ross, Bt	Tory (Pittite)
1796	William Dundas	Tory
1802	John Villiers	
1805 by-election	James MacDonald	
1806	John Randoll Mackenzie	
1808 by-election	William Fremantle	
1812	Sir Hugh Innes, Bt	Tory
1830	James Loch	Whig
1832	constituency abolished	

== Elections ==
The electoral system for this constituency gave each of the five burghs one vote, with an additional casting vote (to break ties) for the burgh where the election was held. The place of election rotated amongst the burghs in successive Parliaments. The vote of a burgh was exercised by a burgh commissioner, who was elected by the burgh councillors.

The primary source for the results was Stooks Smith with additional information from the History of Parliament series. For details of the books used, see the Reference section below.

The reference to some candidates as Non Partisan does not, necessarily, mean that they did not have a party allegiance. It means that the sources consulted did not specify a party allegiance.

1710s – 1720s – 1730s – 1740s – 1750s – 1760s – 1770s – 1780s – 1790s – 1800s – 1810s – 1820s – 1830s

=== Elections of the 1700s ===
General election 26 May 1708: Tain Burghs (election at Tain)
Party	Candidate	Votes	%	±%
Nonpartisan	Lord Strathnaver	Unopposed	N/A	N/A
Nonpartisan gain from new seat		Swing	N/A	

- 1708 (3 December): Strathnaver declared ineligible as the eldest son of a Peer of Scotland

By-Election 5 May 1709: Tain Burghs (election at Tain)
Party	Candidate	Votes	%	±%
Nonpartisan	Robert Douglas	Unopposed	N/A	N/A
Nonpartisan hold		Swing	N/A	

=== Elections of the 1710s ===
General election 27 October 1710: Tain Burghs (election at Dingwall)
Party	Candidate	Votes	%	±%
Whig	Robert Munro	Unopposed	N/A	N/A
Whig gain from Nonpartisan		Swing	N/A	

General election 1713: Tain Burghs (election at Dornoch)
Party	Candidate	Votes	%	±%
Whig	Robert Munro	Unopposed	N/A	N/A
Whig hold		Swing	N/A	

General election 1715: Tain Burghs (election at Wick)
Party	Candidate	Votes	%	±%
Whig	Robert Munro	Unopposed	N/A	N/A
Whig hold		Swing	N/A	

=== Elections of the 1720s ===
General election 1722: Tain Burghs (election at Kirkwall)
Party	Candidate	Votes	%	±%
Whig	Robert Munro	Elected	N/A	N/A
Nonpartisan	Robert Gordon	Defeated	N/A	N/A
Whig hold		Swing	N/A	

General election 1727: Tain Burghs (election at Tain)
Party	Candidate	Votes	%	±%
Whig	Robert Munro	Unopposed	N/A	N/A
Whig hold		Swing	N/A	

=== Elections of the 1730s ===
General election 1734: Tain Burghs (election at Dingwall)
Party	Candidate	Votes	%	±%
Whig	Robert Munro	Unopposed	N/A	N/A
Whig hold		Swing	N/A	

=== Elections of the 1740s ===
General election 28 May 1741: Tain Burghs (election at Dornoch)
Party	Candidate	Votes	%	±%
Nonpartisan	Charles Erskine	Elected	N/A	N/A
Whig	Robert Munro	Defeated	N/A	N/A
Nonpartisan gain from Whig		Swing	N/A	

- Election declared void

By-Election 2 April 1742: Tain Burghs (election at Dornoch)
Party	Candidate	Votes	%	±%
Nonpartisan	Robert Craigie	Unopposed	N/A	N/A
Nonpartisan hold		Swing	N/A	

General election 22 July 1747: Tain Burghs (election at Wick)
Party	Candidate	Votes	%	±%
Whig	Harry Munro	Unopposed	N/A	N/A
Whig gain from Nonpartisan		Swing	N/A	

=== Elections of the 1750s ===
General election 9 May 1754: Tain Burghs (election at Kirkwall)
Party	Candidate	Votes	%	±%
Whig	Harry Munro	Unopposed	N/A	N/A
Whig hold		Swing	N/A	

=== Elections of the 1760s ===
General election 20 April 1761: Tain Burghs (election at Tain)
Party	Candidate	Votes	%	±%
Nonpartisan	John Scott	Unopposed	N/A	N/A
Nonpartisan gain from Whig		Swing	N/A	

General election 11 April 1768: Tain Burghs (election at Dingwall)
Party	Candidate	Votes	%	±%
Nonpartisan	Alexander Mackay	Unopposed	N/A	N/A
Nonpartisan hold		Swing	N/A	

=== Elections of the 1770s ===
- 1773 (February): Resignation of Mackay

By-Election 26 April 1773: Tain Burghs (election at Dingwall)
Party	Candidate	Votes	%	±%
Nonpartisan	James Grant	Unopposed	N/A	N/A
Nonpartisan hold		Swing	N/A	

General election 31 October 1774: Tain Burghs (election at Dornoch)
Party	Candidate	Votes	%	±%
Nonpartisan	James Grant	3 Dingwall, Dornoch, Kirkwall	60.0	N/A
Nonpartisan	Adam Fergusson	2 Tain, Wick	40.0	N/A
Majority		1	20.0	N/A
Turnout		5	100.0	N/A
Nonpartisan hold		Swing	N/A	

=== Elections of the 1780s ===
General election 2 October 1780: Tain Burghs (election at Wick)
Party	Candidate	Votes	%	±%
Whig	Charles Ross	Unopposed	N/A	N/A
Whig gain from Nonpartisan		Swing	N/A	

General election 26 April 1784: Tain Burghs (election at Kirkwall)
Party	Candidate	Votes	%	±%
Whig	Charles James Fox	3 Dingwall, Kirkwall, Tain	60.0	N/A
Tory	John Sinclair	2 Dornoch, Wick	40.0	N/A
Majority		1	20.0	N/A
Turnout		5	100.0	N/A
Whig hold		Swing	N/A	

- 1786 (March): Fox chose to represent Westminster, where he had been declared duly elected in the 1784 general election, after an election petition and a prolonged scrutiny of votes

By-Election 15 March 1786: Tain Burghs (election at Kirkwall)
Party	Candidate	Votes	%	±%
Whig	George Ross	3 Dingwall, Kirkwall, Tain	60.0	N/A
Tory	James Riddell	2 Dornoch, Wick	40.0	N/A
Majority		1	20.0	N/A
Turnout		5	100.0	N/A
Whig hold		Swing	N/A	

- 1786 (7 April): Ross died

By-Election 30 June 1786: Tain Burghs (election at Kirkwall)
Party	Candidate	Votes	%	±%
Tory	Charles Lockhart-Ross	3 Dornoch, Tain, Wick	60.0	+20.0
Whig	Charles Ross	2 Dingwall, Kirkwall	40.0	−20.0
Majority		1	20.0	N/A
Turnout		5	100.0	N/A
Tory gain from Whig		Swing	+20.0 (W to T)	

=== Elections of the 1790s ===
General election 12 July 1790: Tain Burghs (election at Tain)
Party	Candidate	Votes	%	±%
Tory	Charles Lockhart-Ross	Unopposed	N/A	N/A
Tory hold		Swing	N/A	

General election 20 June 1796: Tain Burghs (election at Dingwall)
Party	Candidate	Votes	%	±%
Nonpartisan	William Dundas	Unopposed	N/A	N/A
Nonpartisan gain from Tory		Swing	N/A	

- November 1797: Dundas appointed a Commissioner for the Affairs of India

By-Election 1797: Tain Burghs (election at Dingwall)
Party	Candidate	Votes	%	±%
Nonpartisan	William Dundas	Unopposed	N/A	N/A
Nonpartisan hold		Swing	N/A	

=== Elections of the 1800s ===
General election 30 July 1802: Tain Burghs (election at Dornoch)
Party	Candidate	Votes	%	±%
Nonpartisan	John Villiers	Unopposed	N/A	N/A
Nonpartisan hold				

By-Election 1804: Tain Burghs (election at Dornoch)
Party	Candidate	Votes	%	±%
Nonpartisan	John Villiers	Unopposed	N/A	N/A
Nonpartisan hold				

- July 1804: Villiers appointed Chief Prothonotary Common Pleas of the County Palatine of Lancaster
- 1805: Villiers resigned

By-Election 26 June 1805: Tain Burghs (election at Dornoch)
Party	Candidate	Votes	%	±%
Nonpartisan	James MacDonald	Unopposed	N/A	N/A
Nonpartisan hold				

General election 24 November 1806: Tain Burghs (election at Wick)
Party	Candidate	Votes	%	±%
Nonpartisan	John Mackenzie (MP)	3	60.0	N/A
Nonpartisan	John Sinclair	2	40.0	N/A
Majority		1	20.0	N/A
Turnout		5	100.0	N/A
Nonpartisan hold		Swing	N/A	

General election 1807: Tain Burghs (election at Kirkwall)
Party	Candidate	Votes	%	±%
Nonpartisan	John Mackenzie (MP)	Unopposed	N/A	N/A
Nonpartisan hold				

- Mackenzie resigned to stand for Sutherland

By-Election 7 May 1808: Tain Burghs (election at Kirkwall)
Party	Candidate	Votes	%	±%
Nonpartisan	William Fremantle	Unopposed	N/A	N/A
Nonpartisan hold				

=== Elections of the 1810s ===
General election 30 October 1812: Tain Burghs (election at Tain)
Party	Candidate	Votes	%	±%
Tory	Hugh Innes	3	60.0	New
Nonpartisan	Charles Lockhart-Ross	2	40.0	N/A
Majority		1	20.0	N/A
Turnout		5	100.0	N/A
Tory gain from Nonpartisan		Swing	N/A	

General election 1818: Tain Burghs (election at Dingwall)
Party	Candidate	Votes	%	±%
Tory	Hugh Innes	Unopposed	N/A	N/A
Tory hold				

=== Elections of the 1820s ===
General election 1820: Tain Burghs (election at Dornoch)
Party	Candidate	Votes	%	±%
Tory	Hugh Innes	Unopposed	N/A	N/A
Tory hold				

General election 1826: Tain Burghs (election at Wick)
Party	Candidate	Votes	%	±%
Tory	Hugh Innes	Unopposed	N/A	N/A
Tory hold				

=== Elections of the 1830s ===
General election 23 August 1830: Tain Burghs (election at Kirkwall)
Party	Candidate	Votes	%	±%
Whig	James Loch	Unopposed	N/A	N/A
Whig gain from Tory				

General election 1831: Tain Burghs (election at Tain)
Party	Candidate	Votes	%	±%
Whig	James Loch	Unopposed	N/A	N/A
Whig hold				

- Constituency expanded and renamed in the 1832 redistribution
