= Wick (Parliament of Scotland constituency) =

Parliament of Scotland constituency

Wick in Caithness was a royal burgh that returned one commissioner to the Parliament of Scotland and to the Convention of Estates.

After the Acts of Union 1707, Wick, Dingwall, Dornoch, Kirkwall and Tain formed the Tain district of burghs, returning one member between them to the House of Commons of Great Britain.

== List of burgh commissioners ==
- 1661: William McBaith, merchant-burgess
- 1665 convention, 1667 convention, 1669–74: no representation
- 1678 convention, 1681–82, 1685–86: Alexander Manson, merchant, bailie
- 1690–1701: Sir Archibald Sinclair
- 1702–07: Robert Fraser

== See also ==
- List of constituencies in the Parliament of Scotland at the time of the Union
