= Arthur Cromarty =

American judge

Arthur Martin Cromarty (July 3, 1919 – May 1, 2014) was an American jurist.

Born in Brooklyn, New York City, Cromarty received his bachelor's degree from University of Alabama. He then received his law degree from St. John's University School of Law. During World War II, he served in the United States Army Air Forces as a pilot in Europe. Cromarty then practiced law and served in local government. Cromarty was elected to the New York Supreme Court for Suffolk County, New York, serving from 1966 until 1993, and was administrative judge. He died in Florida.
