= Sir Charles Munro, 9th Baronet =

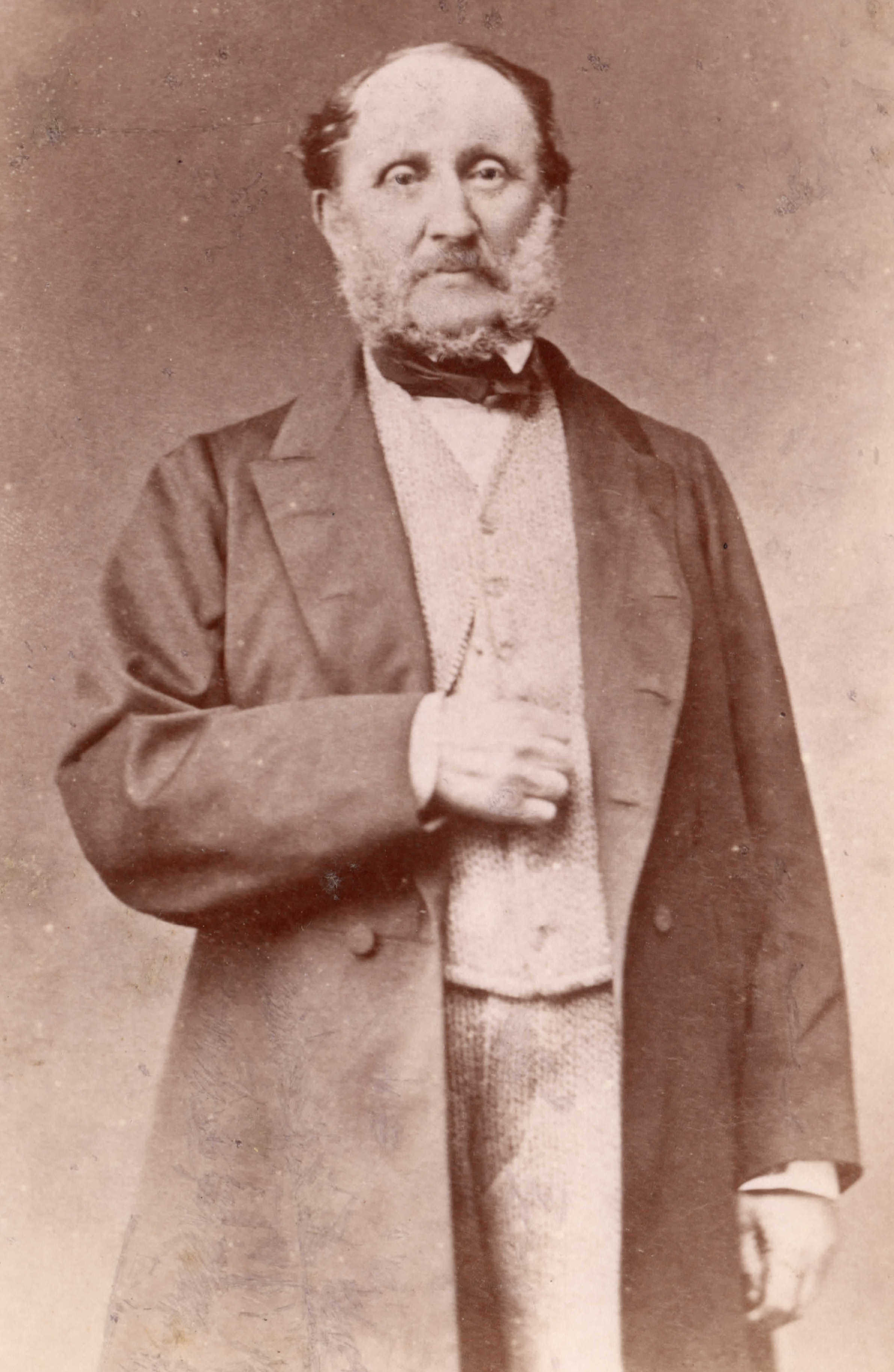
Sir Charles Munro, 9th Baronet of Foulis (1795-1886)

Sir Charles Munro, 9th Baronet of Foulis (20 May 1795 – 12 July 1886) was a Scottish Baronet and soldier. He was also chief of the Highland Clan Munro.

== Biography ==
Sir Charles Munro was the son of George Munro of Culrain and a lineal descendant of Sir George Munro, 1st of Newmore. Sir Charles was born in 1795 and educated at Edinburgh.

Sir Charles Munro entered the British Army as Ensign in the 45th (Nottinghamshire) Regiment of Foot, and served with much distinction, under the Arthur Wellesley, 1st Duke of Wellington - who in the General Orders of Madrid described Sir Charles Munro as "one of the bravest officers in the British Army", in the Peninsular Campaign, from 1810 to the conclusion of the war in 1815. He was badly wounded at the storming of Badajoz. As an acknowledgement of his distinguished services, he was awarded a medal with seven clasps: for the Siege of Ciudad Rodrigo (1812) (18 January 1812), Battle of Badajoz (6 April 1812), Battle of Salamanca (22 July 1812), Battle of Nive (13 December 1813), Battle of Orthez (17 February 1814), and Battle of Toulouse (10 April 1814).

It has been reported that Charles Munro also served in the War of Independence in South America and in 1817 commanded the 1st Regiment of English Lancers in the service of Venezuela under the celebrated patriot, General Simon Bolivar. He certainly negotiated to do so but in the event, he appears not to have left British shores.

== Family ==
Sir Charles Munro married first while a captain in the army on 20 June 1817, Amelia, daughter of Frederick Browne, 14th Light Dragoons, with issue:

1. George Frederick Munro. (died young)
2. Charles Robert Munro, 10th Baronet. (heir and successor)
3. Harry Munro. (whose son was Sir George Hamilton Munro, 12th Baronet)
4. Frederick Ledsum Munro. (moved to Australia)
5. Gustavus Francis Munro (Lieutenant Colonel in the Royal Marines).
6. Arthur Munro
7. Marion Ross Munro.
8. Amelia Agnes Munro.

Amelia Munro died in 1849, and was buried in Kensal Green Cemetery.

Sir Charles Munro married secondly, in 1853, Harriet Midgely (1808-1886) by whom he had had a son, Charles, in about 1826.

Charles Munro was of irascible and litigious temperament, with a burning resentment that his father had been cheated out of his rightful inheritance by Sir Hector Munro of Novar. To fund a protracted and ultimately futile attempt to prevent the succession of Mary Seymour Munro, daughter of the 8th baronet, to Foulis Castle, Charles granted bonds on his prospective inheritance of the estate. In 1843 he was arrested for unpaid debts amounting to nearly £80,000. Falling heir in any case on Mary's death without succession in 1849, he inherited an estate much depleted by the costs of the litigation on her side, and heavily in debt to his own lawyers. Ultimately he left the task of extricating the estate from these legal entanglements to his son and heir Charles. He never resided at Foulis Castle, preferring instead to live with his second wife in Southport, Lancashire, where he died in 1886.

== See also ==
- Munro baronets
- Munro of Culrain

Baronetage of Nova Scotia
Preceded by Hugh Munro	Baronet (of Foulis); 1848–1886	Succeeded by Charles Munro
