= 37th (North Hampshire) Regiment of Foot =

Infantry regiment of the British Army

- 1874–1881 regimental glengarry badge for other ranks
- Active: 1702–1881
- Country: England (1689–1707); Great Britain (1707–1800); United Kingdom (1801–1881)
- Branch: English Army; British Army
- Type: Infantry
- Role: Line infantry
- Size: One battalion (1702–1756, 1758–1813, 1817–1881); Two battalions (1756–1758, 1813–1817)
- Garrison/HQ: Lower Barracks, Winchester
- Engagements: War of the Spanish Succession; War of the Austrian Succession; Seven Years' War; American War of Independence; French Revolutionary and Napoleonic Wars; Matale rebellion; Indian Rebellion of 1857

The 37th (North Hampshire) Regiment of Foot was a line infantry regiment of the English Army and British Army. Raised in Ireland in February 1702 by Thomas Meredyth, the regiment served in the War of the Spanish Succession and War of the Austrian Succession. A royal warrant issued in 1751 ordered all regiments of foot to be known by their number on the order of precedence and the regiment was renamed the 37th Regiment of Foot. The regiment served in the Seven Years' War before garrisoning Minorca from 1763 to 1769.

The regiment served in the American War of Independence, during which it was renamed the "37th (North Hampshire) Regiment of Foot" in 1782. It subsequently served in the French Revolutionary and Napoleonic Wars before being sent to South Asia, where the regiment participated in the suppression of the Matale rebellion in 1848 and the Indian Rebellion of 1857. In 1881 the regiment was amalgamated with the 67th (South Hampshire) Regiment of Foot under the Childers Reforms to form the Hampshire Regiment.

== History ==
=== Early years ===
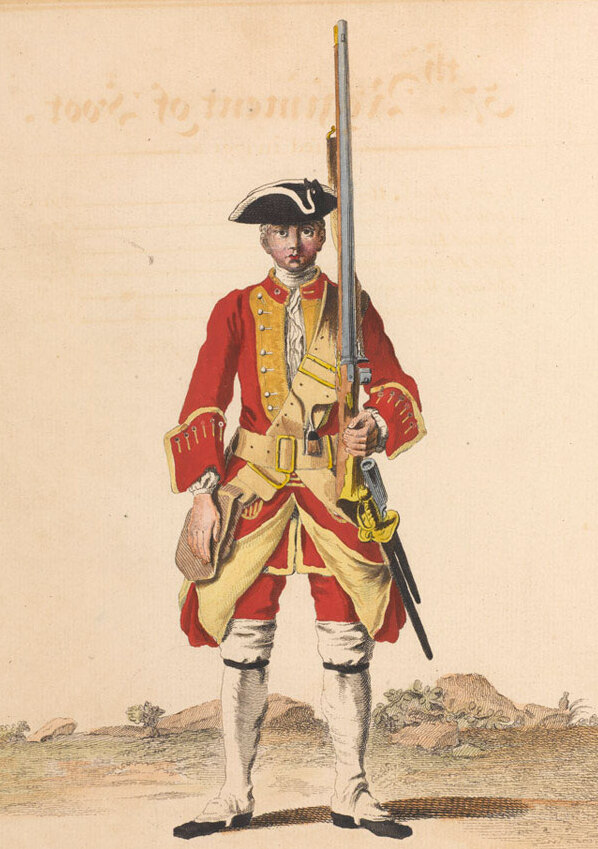
c. 1742 engraving of a regimental private

c. 1751 painting of a regimental grenadier (left)

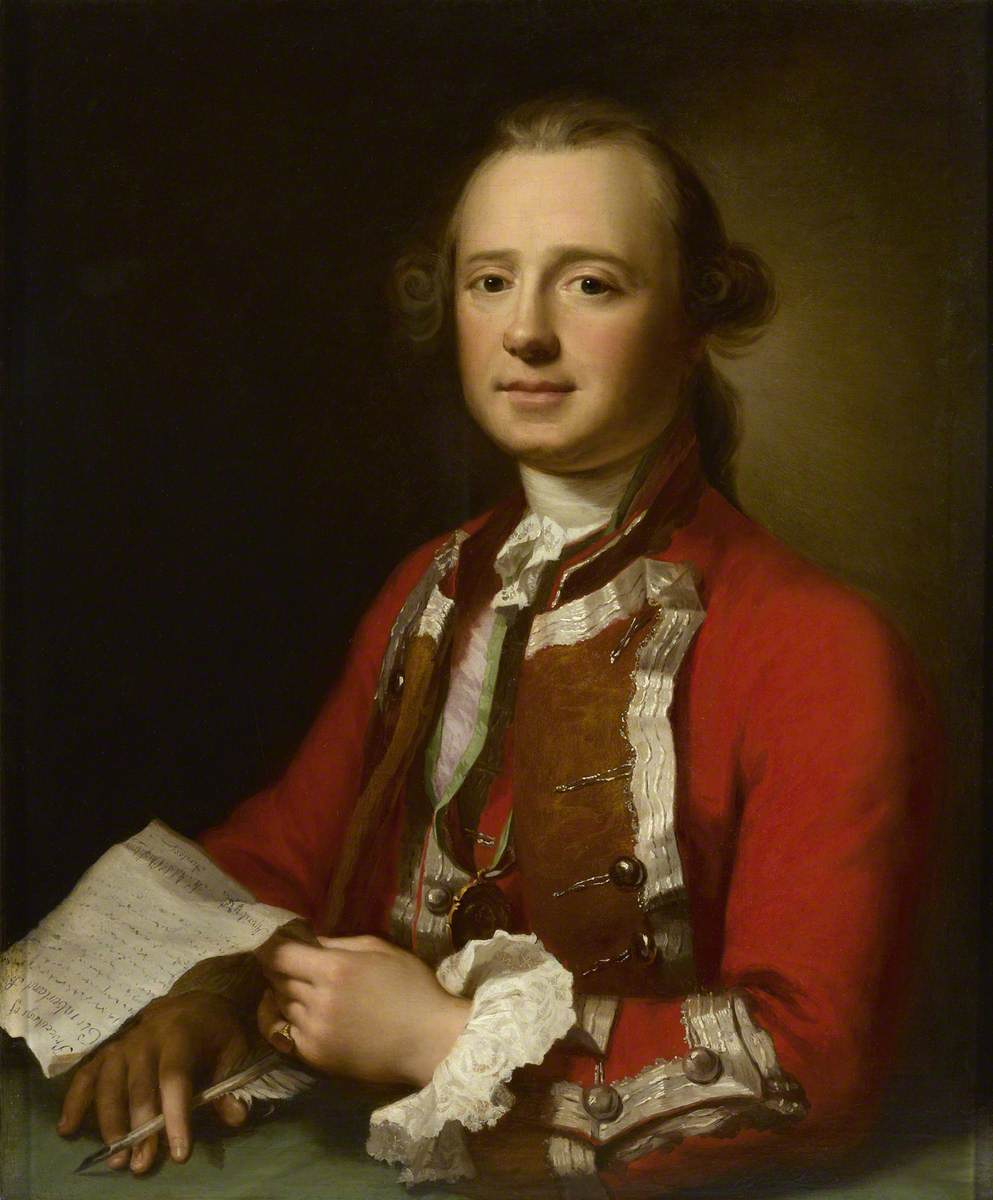
c. 1753 portrait of a regimental lieutenant colonel

The regiment was raised in Ireland by Colonel Thomas Meredyth as Thomas Meredyth's Regiment of Foot in February 1702 to serve in the War of the Spanish Succession. It embarked for the Netherlands in May 1703 and fought under the Duke of Marlborough at the Battle of Schellenberg in July 1704, the Battle of Blenheim in August 1704 and the Battle of Ramillies in May 1706 as well as the Battle of Oudenarde in July 1708 and the Battle of Malplaquet in September 1709 during the War of the Spanish Succession. The regiment embarked for Canada in 1711 as part of the Quebec Expedition but lost 8 officers and 253 men when the ships in which it was sailing foundered on the rocks on the Saint Lawrence River; the expedition returned home. It was also in action at the Capture of Vigo in October 1719.

The regiment next saw action at the Battle of Dettingen in June 1743 during the War of the Austrian Succession. It also fought at the Battle of Falkirk in January 1746 during the Jacobite rebellion when its colonel, Sir Robert Munro, 6th Baronet, was shot and then finished off with three sword blows to the head. It went on to fight under the command of Colonel Lewis Dejean at the Battle of Culloden in April 1746 and was ranked the 37th Foot in 1747. The regiment returned to the Netherlands and fought at the Battle of Lauffeld in July 1747.

On 1 July 1751 a royal warrant was issued which provided that in future regiments would no longer be known by their colonel's name, but would bear a regimental number based on their precedence: the regiment became the 37th Regiment of Foot. The second battalion became the 75th Regiment of Foot in 1758. The regiment fought at the Battle of Minden in August 1759 during the Seven Years' War. After the battle the men of the regiment picked dog-roses from the hedges and put them in their headdresses to celebrate the victory. It also took part in a skirmish at Grebenstein in June 1762 and another at Fellinghausen in July 1762. It was then garrisoned in Menorca from 1763 to 1769.

The regiment embarked for North America in 1776 for service in the American War of Independence and was present at the Battle of Long Island on 27 August 1776 and the siege of Yorktown in late 1781. On 21 August 1782 the regiment was renamed the 37th (North Hampshire) Regiment of Foot due to a regulation issued by Commander-in-Chief of the Forces Henry Seymour Conway, who was attempting to boost recruiting efforts at a time when Britain's involvement in the American War of Independence was becoming increasingly unpopular among the British public.

=== French Revolutionary and Napoleonic Wars ===
The regiment was next in action at the Battle of Tournay in May 1794 in the Flanders campaign of the War of the First Coalition. It was posted to the West Indies from 1800 to 1809, to Gibraltar from 1812 to 1814, and to Canada from 1814 to 1826.

=== Victorian era ===
Members of the regimental non-commissioned officers' Masonic lodge in India, c. 1880

The regiment embarked for British Ceylon in 1846 and took part in the suppression of the Matale rebellion in 1848. It moved to British India in spring 1857 and, having arrived by steamer on the Son River, engaged Indian mutineers at the siege of Arrah in July 1857 during the Indian Rebellion of 1857. It returned to England in 1861 and was sent to Ireland in 1865 before returning to India in 1866.

As part of the Cardwell Reforms of the 1870s, where single-battalion regiments were linked together to share a single depot and recruiting district in the United Kingdom, the 37th was linked with the 67th (South Hampshire) Regiment of Foot, and assigned to district no. 40 at Lower Barracks in Winchester. The regiment returned to England in 1875 and then moved to Ireland in 1880. On 1 July 1881 the Childers Reforms came into effect and the regiment amalgamated with the 67th (South Hampshire) Regiment of Foot to become the Hampshire Regiment (later the Royal Hampshire Regiment).

== Battle honours ==
Battle honours won by the regiment were:

- Minden, Tournay, Peninsula
- Blenheim, Ramillies, Oudenarde, Malplaquet, Dettingen (all awarded to successor regiment, 1882)

== Regimental Colonels ==
Colonels of the Regiment were:

- 1702–1710: Lt-Gen. Thomas Meredyth
- 1710–1715: Col. William Windress
- 1715–1717: Gen. John Fane, 7th Earl of Westmorland (Baron Catherlough)
- 1717–1722: Col. Edward Montagu, Viscount Hinchingbrooke
- 1722–1735: Brig-Gen. Hon. Robert Murray
- 1735–1745: Maj-Gen. Hon. Henry Ponsonby (killed at the Battle of Fontenoy)
- 1745–1746: Col. Sir Robert Munro, Bt. (killed at the Battle of Falkirk)
- 1746–1752: Lt-Gen. Lewis Dejean

37th Regiment of Foot

- 1752–1768: Lt-Gen. Hon. James Stuart
- 1768–1773: Lt-Gen. Sir George Gray, Bt.
- 1773–1783: Lt-Gen. Sir Eyre Coote, KB

37th (the North Hampshire) Regiment of Foot

- 1783–1798: Gen. Sir John Dalling
- 1798–1810: Gen. Sir Hew Whitefoord Dalrymple
- 1810–1814: Lt-Gen. Sir Charles Ross, Bt
- 1814–1831: Gen. Sir Charles Green, Bt
- 1831–1851: Gen. Hon. Sir Alexander Duff, GCH
- 1851–1858: Lt-Gen. William Smelt, CB
- 1858–1862: Lt-Gen. John Fraser
- 1862–1879: Gen. Sir Thomas Simson Pratt, KCB
- 1879–1881: Gen. Sir Edmund Haythorne, KCB

== Sources ==
- Mackenzie, Alexander (1898). History of the Munros of Fowlis. A. & W. Mackenzie.
- Whitting, Captain John Everard (1878). Annals of the Thirty-Seventh North Hampshire Regiment. Warren & Son.
