= Cromartyshire (Parliament of Scotland constituency) =

Constituency of the Old Parliament of Scotland

Before the Act of Union 1707, the barons of the shire of Cromarty elected commissioners to represent them in the unicameral Parliament of Scotland and in the Convention of Estates. After 1708, Cromartyshire and Nairnshire alternated in returning one member to the House of Commons of Great Britain and later to the House of Commons of the United Kingdom.

== List of shire commissioners ==
- 1600: John Urquhart of Craigfintray
- 1617–1633: Sir Thomas Urquhart of Cromarty
- 1639–41, 1643–44, 1644–47, 1648–51: no representation

During the Commonwealth of England, Scotland and Ireland, the sheriffdoms of Sutherland, Ross and Cromarty were jointly represented by one Member of Parliament in the Protectorate Parliament at Westminster. After the Restoration, the Parliament of Scotland was again summoned to meet in Edinburgh.

- 1661–1663: no representation
- 1665 convention, 1667 convention, 1669–1674, 1678 convention, 1681–82, 1685–1686: George Dallas of St Martins
- 1693–1702, 1702–1707: Sir Kenneth Mackenzie of Cromarty and Grandvale
- 1693: John Urquhart of Craighouse (expelled, 1700)
- 1700–1701: Roderick Mackenzie of Prestonhall
- 1703–1707: Aeneas McLeod of Cadboll

== See also ==
- List of constituencies in the Parliament of Scotland at the time of the Union
