= Dingwall (Burgh) =

Parliamentary Burgh of Scotland

The Parliamentary Burgh of Dingwall was a constituent of two successive District of Burghs, Tain and Wick.

Dingwall had been a constituency in its own right in the Parliament of Scotland.

From 1716 to 1745 the Munros controlled Dingwall, with Robert Munro as provost — but not without something like two armed Munro "invasions" of the county town in 1721 and 1740, when opposing councillors were abducted to secure a favourable result (for the first incident Colonel Robert and his brother were fined £200 each, and after the second his parliamentary career came to an abrupt end with defeat at the 1741 election).
