= District of burghs =

The Act of Union 1707 and pre-Union Scottish legislation provided for 14 Members of Parliament (MPs) from Scotland to be elected from districts of burghs. All the parliamentary burghs (burghs represented in the pre-Union Parliament of Scotland) were assigned to a district, except for Edinburgh which had an MP to itself. The burghs in a district were not necessarily adjacent or even close together.

Until 1832, the self-elected Council of each burgh in a district elected a commissioner, who had one vote for the MP. The commissioner from the Returning Burgh (which function rotated amongst the burghs in successive elections) had an additional casting vote if the numbers were equal. Burgh councils had small memberships, with the result that the combined electorate for all 14 constituencies in 1831 was no more than 1,270.

The Scottish Reform Act 1832 amended the composition of the districts, and the boundaries of a burgh for parliamentary purposes ceased to be necessarily those of the burgh for other purposes. The franchise was extended, and votes from all the burghs were added together.

There were further changes to the number and the composition of the districts under the Representation of the People (Scotland) Act 1868, Redistribution of Seats Act 1885, and Representation of the People Act 1918.

The district of burghs system was eventually discontinued by the House of Commons (Redistribution of Seats) Act 1949, but the term Burghs continued in use in the names of some constituencies until 1974.

The idea of parliamentary burghs continues to this day, in the form of burgh constituencies, which are distinct from county constituencies. This distinction is significant in terms of the expenses allowed to election candidates.

== List of districts and burghs ==
Period	District	Burgh	County
1708–1832	Aberdeen Burghs	Aberdeen	Aberdeenshire
1708–1832	Aberdeen Burghs	Arbroath	Forfarshire
1708–1832	Aberdeen Burghs	Inverbervie	Kincardineshire
1708–1832	Aberdeen Burghs	Brechin	Forfarshire
1708–1832	Aberdeen Burghs	Montrose	Forfarshire
1708–1832	Anstruther Easter Burghs	Anstruther Easter	Fife
1708–1832	Anstruther Easter Burghs	Anstruther Wester	Fife
1708–1832	Anstruther Easter Burghs	Crail	Fife
1708–1832	Anstruther Easter Burghs	Kilrenny	Fife
1708–1832	Anstruther Easter Burghs	Pittenweem	Fife
1708–1950	Ayr Burghs	Ayr	Ayrshire
1708–1918	Ayr Burghs	Campbeltown	Argyllshire
1708–1918	Ayr Burghs	Inverary	Argyllshire
1708–1950	Ayr Burghs	Irvine	Ayrshire
1708–1832	Ayr Burghs	Rothesay	Buteshire
1832–1918	Ayr Burghs	Oban	Argyllshire
1918–1950	Ayr Burghs	Ardrossan	Ayrshire
1918–1950	Ayr Burghs	Prestwick	Ayrshire
1918–1950	Ayr Burghs	Saltcoats	Ayrshire
1918–1950	Ayr Burghs	Troon	Ayrshire
1918–1950	Dumbarton Burghs	Dumbarton	Dunbartonshire
1918–1950	Dumbarton Burghs	Clydebank	Dunbartonshire
1708–1918	Dumfries Burghs	Dumfries	Dumfriesshire
1708–1918	Dumfries Burghs	Annan	Dumfriesshire
1708–1918	Dumfries Burghs	Kirkcudbright	Kirkcudbrightshire
1708–1918	Dumfries Burghs	Lochmaben	Dumfriesshire
1708–1918	Dumfries Burghs	Sanquhar	Dumfriesshire
1918–1950	Dunfermline Burghs	Dunfermline	Fife
1918–1950	Dunfermline Burghs	Cowdenbeath	Fife
1918–1950	Dunfermline Burghs	Inverkeithing	Fife
1918–1950	Dunfermline Burghs	Lochgelly	Fife
1708–1832	Dysart Burghs	Dysart	Fife
1708–1832	Dysart Burghs	Burntisland	Fife
1708–1832	Dysart Burghs	Kinghorn	Fife
1708–1832	Dysart Burghs	Kirkcaldy	Fife
1708–1918	Elgin Burghs	Elgin	Elginshire
1708–1918	Elgin Burghs	Banff	Banffshire
1708–1918	Elgin Burghs	Cullen	Banffshire
1708–1918	Elgin Burghs	Inverurie	Aberdeenshire
1708–1918	Elgin Burghs	Kintore	Aberdeenshire
1832–1918	Elgin Burghs	Peterhead	Aberdeenshire
1832–1918	Falkirk Burghs	Falkirk	Stirlingshire
1832–1918	Falkirk Burghs	Airdrie	Lanarkshire
1832–1918	Falkirk Burghs	Hamilton	Lanarkshire
1832–1918	Falkirk Burghs	Lanark	Lanarkshire
1832–1918	Falkirk Burghs	Linlithgow	Linlithgowshire
1708–1832	Glasgow Burghs	Glasgow	Lanarkshire
1708–1832	Glasgow Burghs	Dumbarton	Dunbartonshire
1708–1832	Glasgow Burghs	Renfrew	Renfrewshire
1708–1832	Glasgow Burghs	Rutherglen	Lanarkshire
1708–1885	Haddington Burghs	Haddington	Haddingtonshire
1708–1885	Haddington Burghs	Dunbar	Haddingtonshire
1708–1885	Haddington Burghs	Jedburgh	Roxburghshire
1708–1885	Haddington Burghs	Lauder	Berwickshire
1708–1885	Haddington Burghs	North Berwick	Haddingtonshire
1868–1918	Hawick Burghs	Hawick	Roxburghshire
1868–1918	Hawick Burghs	Galashiels	Selkirkshire
1868–1918	Hawick Burghs	Selkirk	Selkirkshire
1708–1918	Inverness Burghs	Inverness	Inverness-shire
1708–1918	Inverness Burghs	Forres	Elginshire
1708–1918	Inverness Burghs	Fortrose	Ross-shire
1708–1918	Inverness Burghs	Nairn	Nairnshire
1832–1918	Kilmarnock Burghs	Kilmarnock	Ayrshire
1832–1918	Kilmarnock Burghs	Dumbarton	Dunbartonshire
1832–1918	Kilmarnock Burghs	Port Glasgow	Renfrewshire
1832–1918	Kilmarnock Burghs	Renfrew	Renfrewshire
1832–1918	Kilmarnock Burghs	Rutherglen	Lanarkshire
1832–1950	Kirkcaldy Burghs	Kirkcaldy	Fife
1832–1950	Kirkcaldy Burghs	Burntisland	Fife
1832–1950	Kirkcaldy Burghs	Dysart	Fife
1832–1950	Kirkcaldy Burghs	Kinghorn	Fife
1918–1950	Kirkcaldy Burghs	Buckhaven	Fife
1918–1950	Kirkcaldy Burghs	Methil and Innerleven	Fife
1832–1918	Leith Burghs	Leith	Edinburghshire
1832–1918	Leith Burghs	Musselburgh	Edinburghshire
1832–1918	Leith Burghs	Portobello	Edinburghshire
1708–1832	Linlithgow Burghs	Linlithgow	Linlithgowshire
1708–1832	Linlithgow Burghs	Lanark	Lanarkshire
1708–1832	Linlithgow Burghs	Peebles	Peeblesshire
1708–1832	Linlithgow Burghs	Selkirk	Selkirkshire
1832–1950	Montrose Burghs	Montrose	Forfarshire
1832–1950	Montrose Burghs	Arbroath	Forfarshire
1832–1950	Montrose Burghs	Brechin	Forfarshire
1832–1950	Montrose Burghs	Forfar	Forfarshire
1832–1950	Montrose Burghs	Inverbervie	Aberdeenshire
1708–1832	Perth Burghs	Perth	Perthshire
1708–1832	Perth Burghs	Cupar	Fife
1708–1832	Perth Burghs	Dundee	Forfarshire
1708–1832	Perth Burghs	Forfar	Forfarshire
1708–1832	Perth Burghs	St Andrews	Fife
1832–1918	St Andrews Burghs	St Andrews	Fife
1832–1918	St Andrews Burghs	Anstruther Easter	Fife
1832–1918	St Andrews Burghs	Anstruther Wester	Fife
1832–1918	St Andrews Burghs	Crail	Fife
1832–1918	St Andrews Burghs	Cupar	Fife
1832–1918	St Andrews Burghs	Kilrenny	Fife
1832–1918	St Andrews Burghs	Pittenweem	Fife
1918–1950	Stirling and Falkirk Burghs	Stirling	Stirlingshire
1918–1950	Stirling and Falkirk Burghs	Falkirk	Stirlingshire
1918–1950	Stirling and Falkirk Burghs	Grangemouth	Stirlingshire
1708–1918	Stirling Burghs	Stirling	Stirlingshire
1708–1918	Stirling Burghs	Culross	Perthshire
1708–1918	Stirling Burghs	Dunfermline	Fife
1708–1918	Stirling Burghs	Inverkeithing	Fife
1708–1832	Stirling Burghs	Queensferry	Linlithgowshire
1832–1918	Stirling Burghs	South Queensferry	Linlithgowshire
1708–1832	Tain Burghs	Tain	Ross-shire
1708–1832	Tain Burghs	Dingwall	Ross-shire
1708–1832	Tain Burghs	Dornoch	Sutherland
1708–1832	Tain Burghs	Kirkwall	Orkney
1708–1832	Tain Burghs	Wick	Caithness
1832–1918	Wick Burghs	Wick	Caithness
1832–1918	Wick Burghs	Cromarty	Cromartyshire
1832–1918	Wick Burghs	Dingwall	Ross-shire
1832–1918	Wick Burghs	Dornoch	Sutherland
1832–1918	Wick Burghs	Kirkwall	Orkney
1832–1918	Wick Burghs	Tain	Ross-shire
1708–1885	Wigtown Burghs	Wigtown	Wigtownshire
1708–1885	Wigtown Burghs	Stranraer	Wigtownshire
1708–1885	Wigtown Burghs	New Galloway	Kirkcudbrightshire
1708–1885	Wigtown Burghs	Whithorn	Wigtownshire

== Summary of districts and burghs by period ==
1708-1832 (14 Districts) (65 Burghs)

1. Aberdeen Burghs (5)
2. Anstruther Easter Burghs (5)
3. Ayr Burghs (5)
4. Dumfries Burghs (5)
5. Dysart Burghs (4)
6. Elgin Burghs (5)
7. Glasgow Burghs (4)
8. Haddington Burghs (5)
9. Inverness Burghs (4)
10. Linlithgow Burghs (4)
11. Perth Burghs (5)
12. Stirling Burghs (5)
13. Tain Burghs (5)
14. Wigtown Burghs (4)

1832-1868 (14 Districts) (69 Burghs)

1. Ayr Burghs (5)
2. Dumfries Burghs (5)
3. Elgin Burghs (6)
4. Falkirk Burghs (5)
5. Haddington Burghs (5)
6. Inverness Burghs (4)
7. Kilmarnock Burghs (5)
8. Kirkcaldy Burghs (4)
9. Leith Burghs (3)
10. Montrose Burghs (5)
11. St Andrews Burghs (7)
12. Stirling Burghs (5)
13. Wick Burghs (6)
14. Wigtown Burghs (4)

1868-1885 (15 Districts) (72 Burghs)

1. Ayr Burghs (5)
2. Dumfries Burghs (5)
3. Elgin Burghs (6)
4. Falkirk Burghs (5)
5. Haddington Burghs (5)
6. Inverness Burghs (4)
7. Hawick Burghs (3)
8. Kilmarnock Burghs (5)
9. Kirkcaldy Burghs (4)
10. Leith Burghs (3)
11. Montrose Burghs (5)
12. St Andrews Burghs (7)
13. Stirling Burghs (5)
14. Wick Burghs (6)
15. Wigtown Burghs (4)

1885-1918 (13 Districts) (62 Burghs)

1. Ayr Burghs (5)
2. Dumfries Burghs (5)
3. Elgin Burghs (6)
4. Falkirk Burghs (5)
5. Hawick Burghs (3)
6. Inverness Burghs (4)
7. Kilmarnock Burghs (5)
8. Kirkcaldy Burghs (4)
9. Leith Burghs (3)
10. Montrose Burghs (5)
11. St Andrews Burghs (7)
12. Stirling Burghs (5)
13. Wick Burghs (6)

1918-1950 (6 Districts) (26 Burghs)

1. Ayr Burghs (6)
2. Dumbarton Burghs (2)
3. Dunfermline Burghs (4)
4. Kirkcaldy Burghs (6)
5. Montrose Burghs (5)
6. Stirling & Falkirk Burghs (3)

== See also ==
- Burgh constituency
- List of burghs in Scotland
