= Munro baronets =

Set index for Munro baronets

There have been three baronetcies created for persons with the surname Munro, one in the Baronetage of Nova Scotia and two in the Baronetage of the United Kingdom.

- Munro baronets of Foulis (1634), succeeded from 1954 by the baronets of Foulis-Obsdale
- Munro baronets of Lindertis (1825)
