= The Land of Thirst =

Painting by Eugène Fromentin

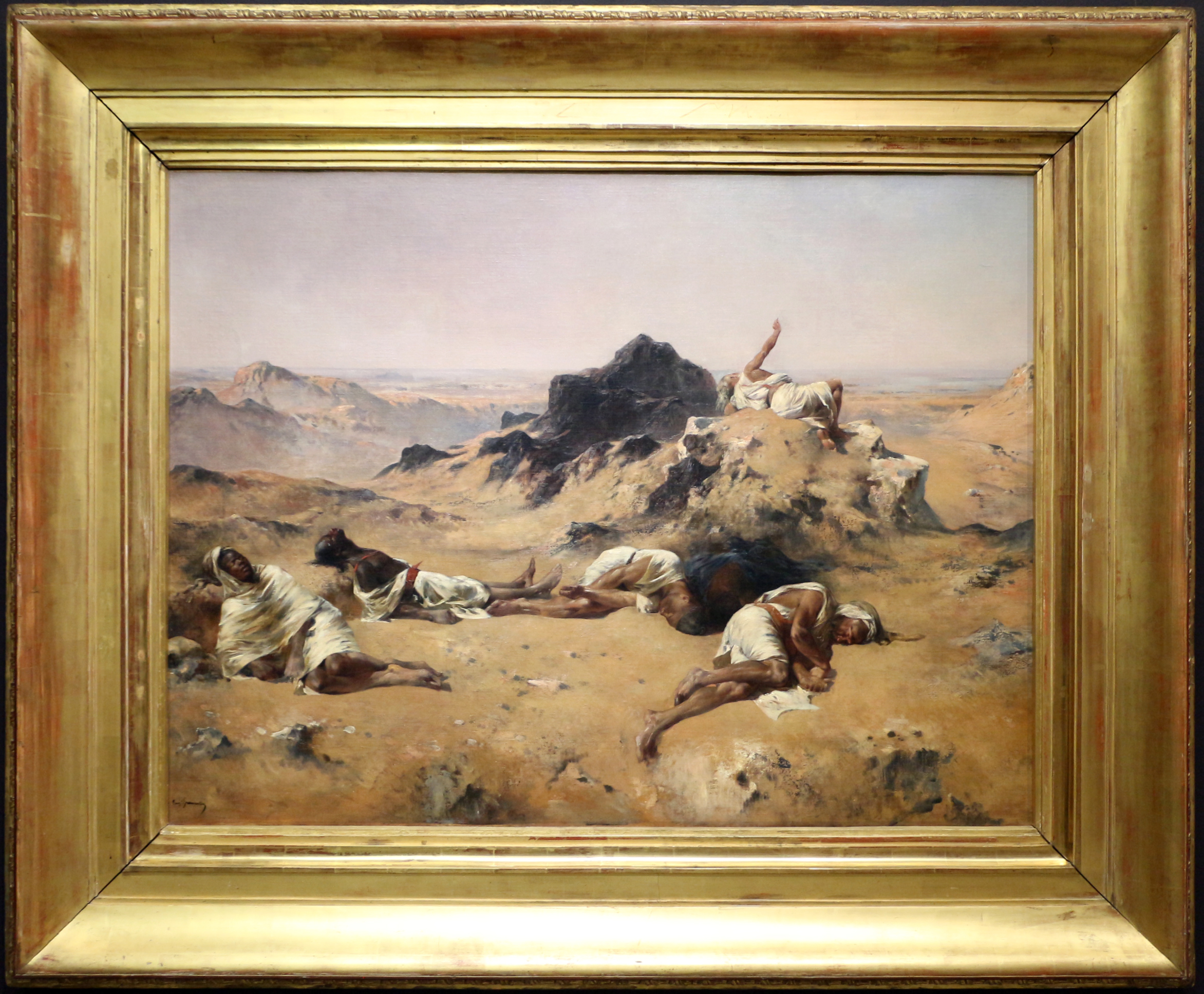
Eugène Fromentin, The Land of Thirst

The Land of Thirst (French: Le Pays de la soif) is an oil painting by Eugène Fromentin. Unusually he painted two versions of the same work - one is currently held in the Musée d'Orsay in Paris and the other in the Royal Museums of Fine Arts of Belgium, Brussels. Only the Brussels version is dated, to 1869, and the Paris version is presumably earlier, though by how much is not known. The term ‘land of thirst” was a commonly-used sobriquet for Algeria at the time.

== Provenance ==
The oil-on-canvas painting was sold after the artist’s death and between 1877 and 1879 in the private collection Verdé-Delisle. It was then sold again and formed part of the collection of fr:Édouard Martell. In 1920 on his death the French state accepted it from his estate and it was assigned to the Louvre. In 1978 it was transferred to the Musée d’Orsay.

The oil-on-wood painting was bought by the Belgian state from the art collector Édouard Kums in 1898.

== Composition ==
Both versions of the painting were created some 15 years after Fromentin’s last visit to Algeria, and neither version left Fromentin’s studio during his lifetime. They depict a terrible episode that Fromentin had recounted in his 1858 book A Year in the Sahel: “The heat increased by six degrees during my absence […] at this same time three years ago, a convoy of twenty men was caught by the desert wind halfway from El-Aghouat to Gardaïa. Eight travelers died, along with three-quarters of the animals.” The painter himself, having ventured into the desert, experienced this scorching heat and even suffered a temporary but complete blindness upon returning from one of these expeditions.

The exhibition catalogue of the 1892 show at the Georges Petit Gallery described the painting thus: “The desert: the sky, heavy with heat, casts its muted tones upon the waves of sand. Sometimes a mirage seems to indicate a pool; but the place one arrives at is dry: no more water, nothing! Those who made up the caravan have collapsed from exhaustion: the men, consumed by burning thirst, writhe in terrible pain, and above them hangs an enormous silence, broken only by the feeble spasms of death. On the horizon, a very distant city silhouettes its stone buildings against the shining air.” "This kind of painting gave rise to a new pictorial theme: shipwrecks in the sands, which, for a few years, would compete with seascapes.”

In the Paris version, the foreground has figures placed theatrically in a triangle reminiscent of Théodore Géricault’s The Raft of the Medusa, with the highest placed figure raising his arm in a desperate plea for help. In the Brussels version, the central figure waving a raised arm is not present; the tormented, wave-like rocks of the Paris canvas are flattened and carrion birds are added. The sky, having lost its delicate violet hues, now weighs heavily on the earthy tones of the ground. Another difference is that in the Brussels version, the young man on the left in a blue caftan is bleeding from his chest.

The treatment of light is important in both versions. It is intensely beautiful, filling the scene with ochre, browns, and burnt sienna. The interplay of light and the differences in tone highlight the destructive power of the sun. The dark skin hue of the men in the scene matches the colours of the desert; it is the very substance of the landscape.

== Exhibition history (oil on canvas painting) ==
- 1877 - Exposition des oeuvres de Eugène Fromentin - Ecole nationale supérieure des Beaux-Arts, Paris
- 1892 - Cent chefs-d'oeuvre des écoles françaises et étrangères - Galerie Georges Petit, Paris
- 1968 - Le Salon imaginaire : Bilder aus den grossen Kunstausstellungen der zweiten Hälfte des XIX. Jahrhunderts - Kunstverein, Berlin
- 1970 - Fromentin, le peintre et l'écrivain : 1820-1876 - musée des Beaux-Arts, La Rochelle
- 1973 - "Equivoques": peintures françaises du XIXe siècle - Musée des Arts Décoratifs, Paris
- 1978-9 - Autour de quelques oeuvres du Second Empire - Palais de Tokyo, musée d'Art et d'Essai, Paris, 1978-1979
- 1984 - The Orientalists: Delacroix to Matisse - European painters in North Africa and the Near East - Royal Academy of Arts, London
- 1997-8 - The oriental mirage - Art Gallery of New South Wales, Sydney
- 1997 - Orientalism Delacroix to Klee, Auckland Art Gallery, Auckland
- 2003 - Eugène Fromentin et l'orientalisme algérien - Musée des Beaux-Arts, La Rochelle
- 2009 - Pays de rêve, voyages d'artistes - Zentrum Paul Klee, Berne
- 2019 - L'Orient des peintres, du rêve à la lumière - Musée Marmottan Monet, Paris
- 2025 - 100 oeuvres qui racontent le climat - Cognac - musée, Cognac

== Critical reception ==
The paintings were widely thought to imply support for France’s colonial venture in Algeria, as they portrayed an indigenous people expiring and in need of help. Although Au Pays de la Soif was not exhibited publicly until 1892, an engraving of it was used to illustrate Fromentin’s 1879 book Sahara et Sahel. This popular work went through multiple editions, ensuring that the image was widely distributed.

Michael J. Heffernan has written “the desert appears as potentially redeemable through the heroic efforts of mankind, and particularly through the energetic activities of Europeans.” The implication in the paintings is that the land needs modern Europe to revive it.
