= Eugène Fromentin =

French painter (1820–1876)

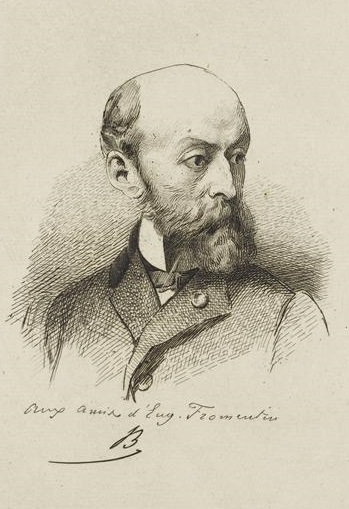
- Born: 24 October 1820; La Rochelle, France
- Died: 27 August 1876 (aged 55); La Rochelle, France
- Education: Louis Cabat
- Known for: Painter, Novelist, Travel literature, Art critic
- Movement: Orientalist

Signature
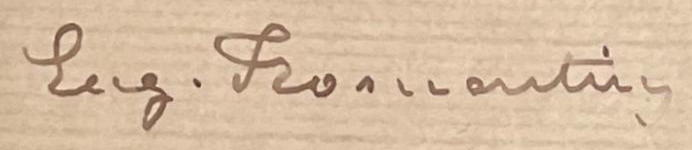

Eugène Fromentin (French pronunciation: [øʒɛn fʁɔmɑ̃tɛ̃]; 24 October 1820 – 27 August 1876) was a French painter and writer.

== Life and career ==
He was born in La Rochelle. After leaving school he studied for some years under Louis Cabat, the landscape painter. Fromentin was one of the earliest pictorial interpreters of Algeria, having been able, while quite young, to visit the land and people that suggested the subjects of most of his works, and to store his memory as well as his portfolio with the picturesque and characteristic details of North African life. His first great success was produced at the Paris Salon of 1847, by the Gorges de la Chiffa. In 1849, he was awarded a medal of the second class.

In 1852, he paid a second visit to Algeria, accompanying an archaeological mission, and then completed that minute study of the scenery of the country and of the habits of its people which enabled him to give to his after-work the realistic accuracy that comes from intimate knowledge.

His books include Les Maîtres d'autrefois ("The Masters of Past Time", 1876), an influential appreciation of Early Netherlandish painting and the Northern Baroque of the Old Masters of Belgium and Holland, Dominique and A Summer in the Sahara. In Les Maîtres d'autrefois he deals with the complexity of paintings by Rubens, Rembrandt and others, their style and the artists' emotions at the time of creating their masterpieces. He is also one of the first "art critics" to approach the subject of The Old Masters from a personal point of view – being a painter himself. He also puts the work in a social, political and economic context, as the Dutch Golden Age painting develops shortly after Holland won its independence. Bernhard Berenson wrote of the book, "I carry Fromentin with me, and read him each evening about the pictures I have seen that he criticizes. He is the only writer on pictures worth his salt, but I do not always agree with him."

Fromentin, who maintained that "art is the expression of the invisible by means of the visible", was much influenced in style by Eugène Delacroix. His works are distinguished by striking composition, great dexterity of handling and brilliancy of colour. In them is given with great truth and refinement the unconscious grandeur of barbarian and animal attitudes and gestures. His later works, however, show signs of an exhausted vein and of an exhausted spirit, accompanied or caused by physical enfeeblement.

Fromentin's other literary works include Visites artistiques (1852); Simples Pèlerinages (1856); Un été dans le Sahara (1857); Une année dans le Sahel (1858). In 1876 he was an unsuccessful candidate for the Academy. He died suddenly at La Rochelle on 27 August 1876.

== Gallery ==
Selection of works

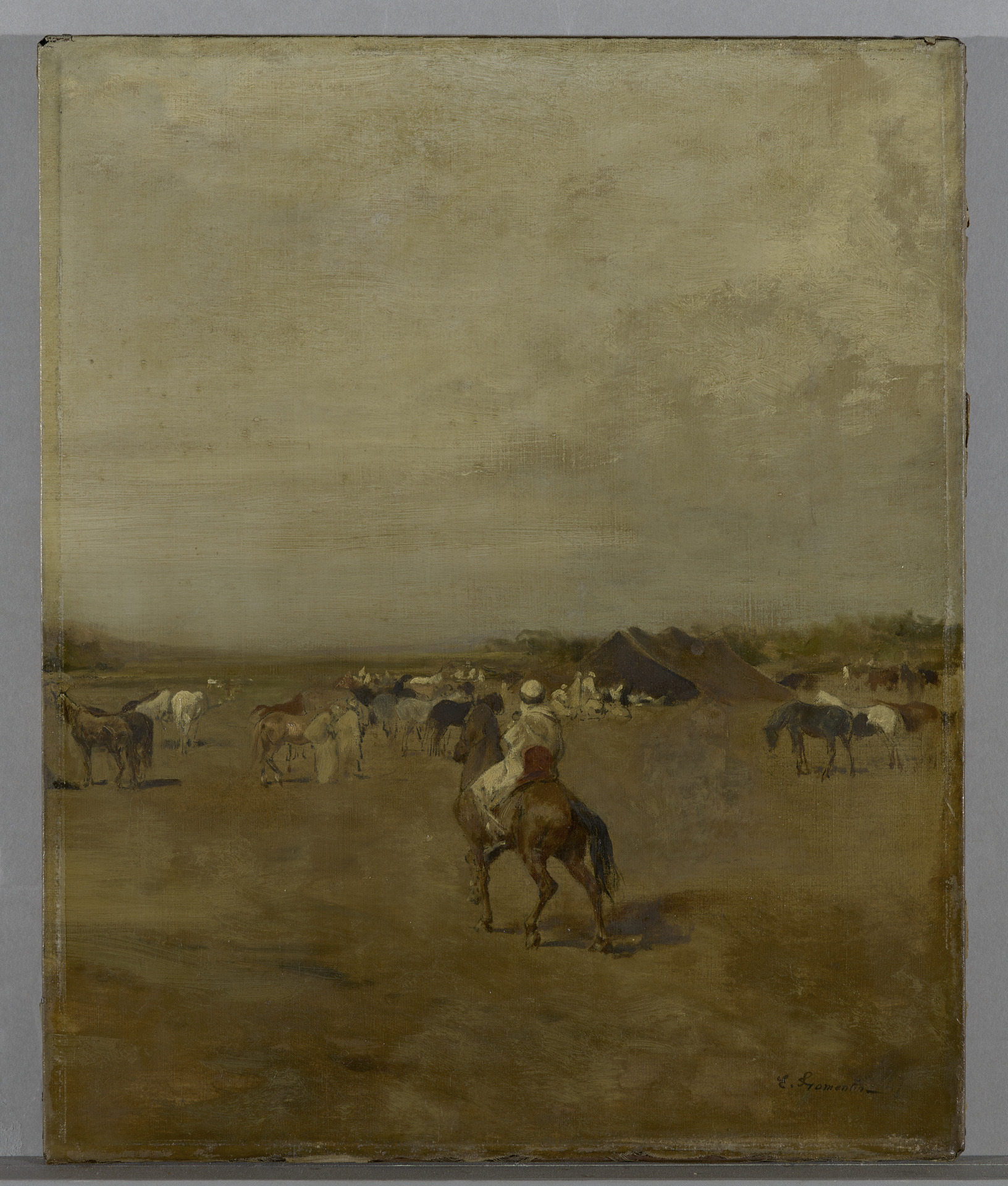
Arabian Encampment, 1848

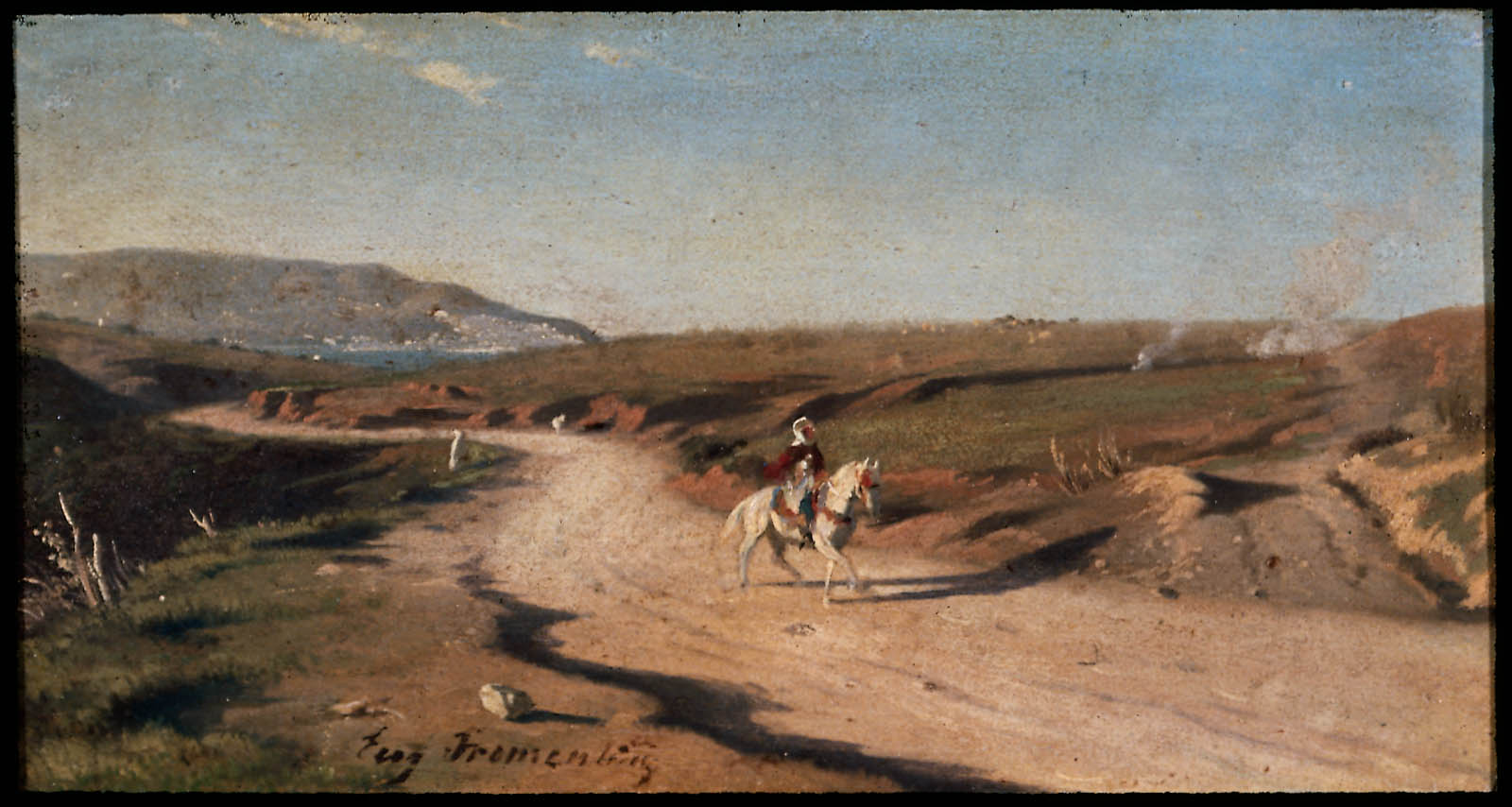
North African Landscape, 1847 ~ 1848

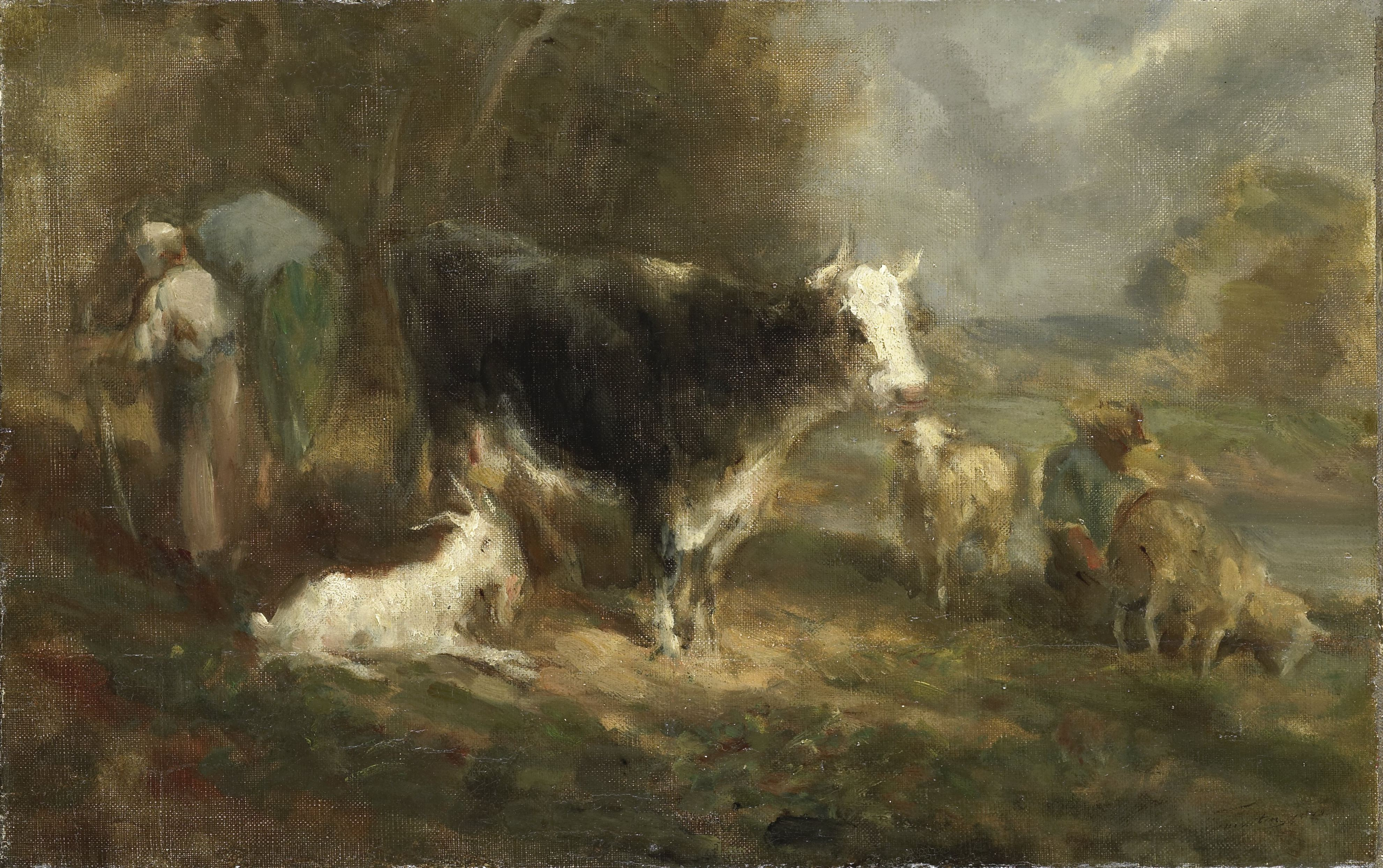
Boerenerf met vee [Farmyard with livestock], 1849

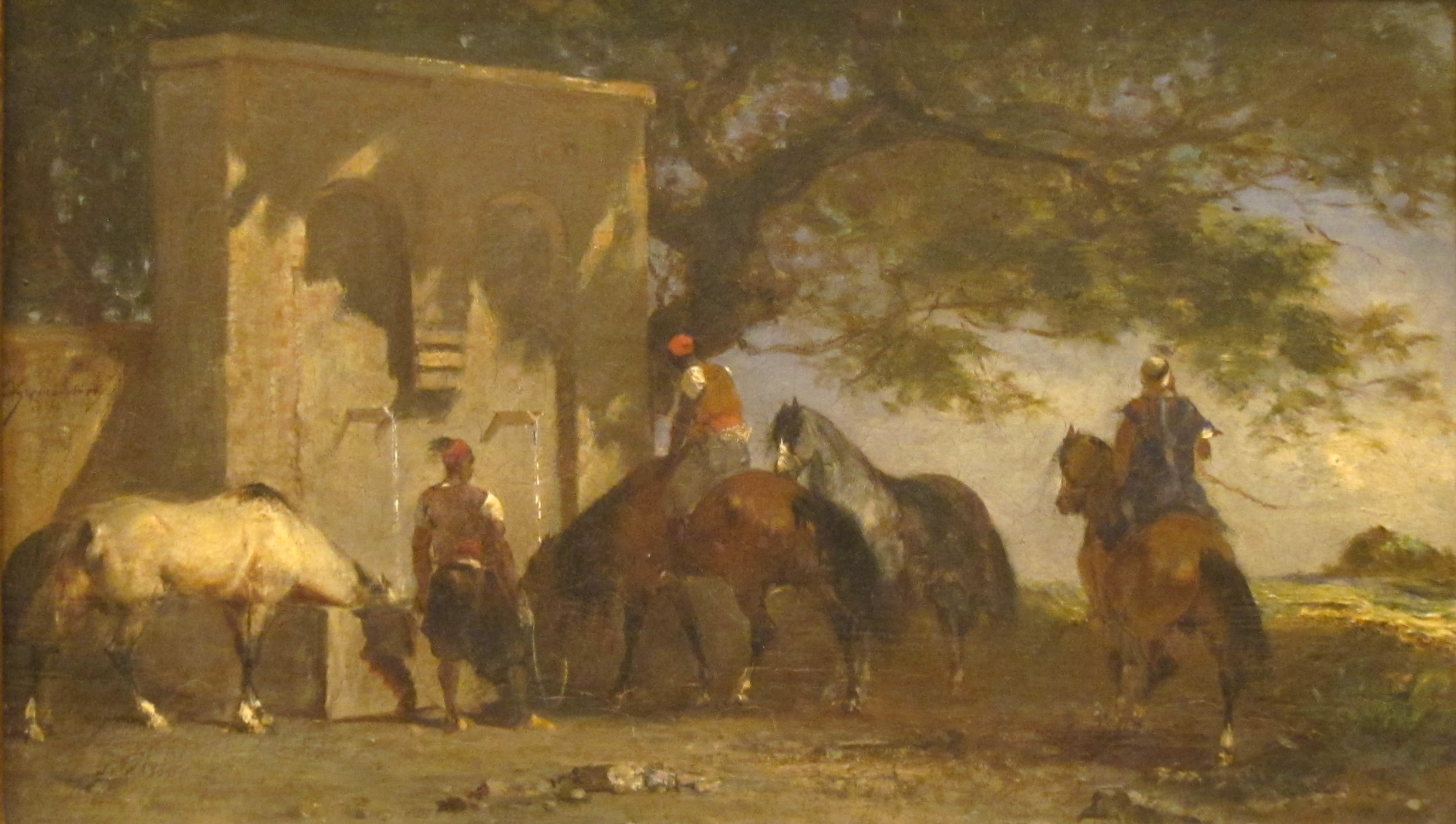
Arabs Watering Their Horses, ca. 1850

Arab woman, 1852

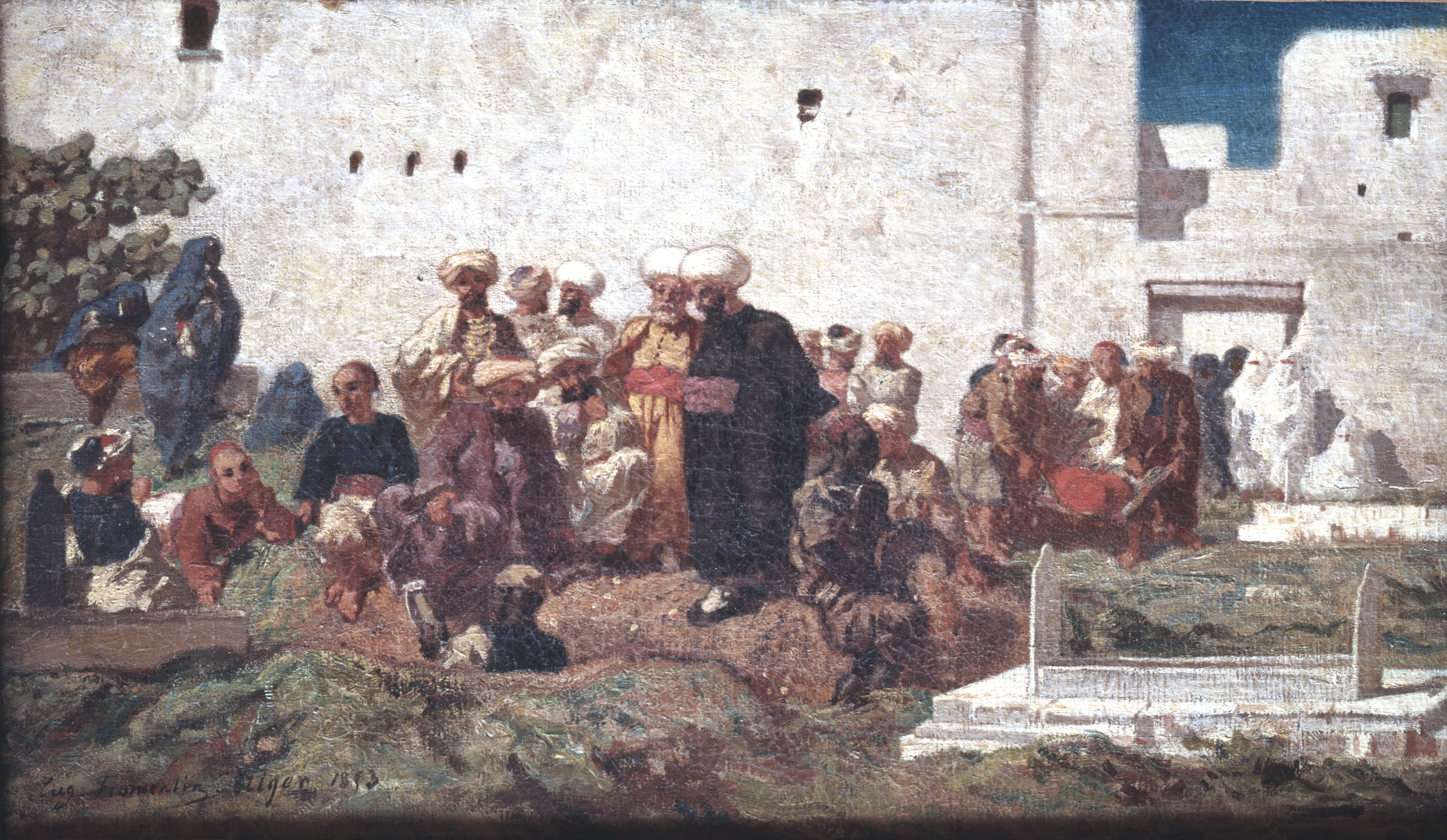
Enterrement maure [Moorish burial], 1853

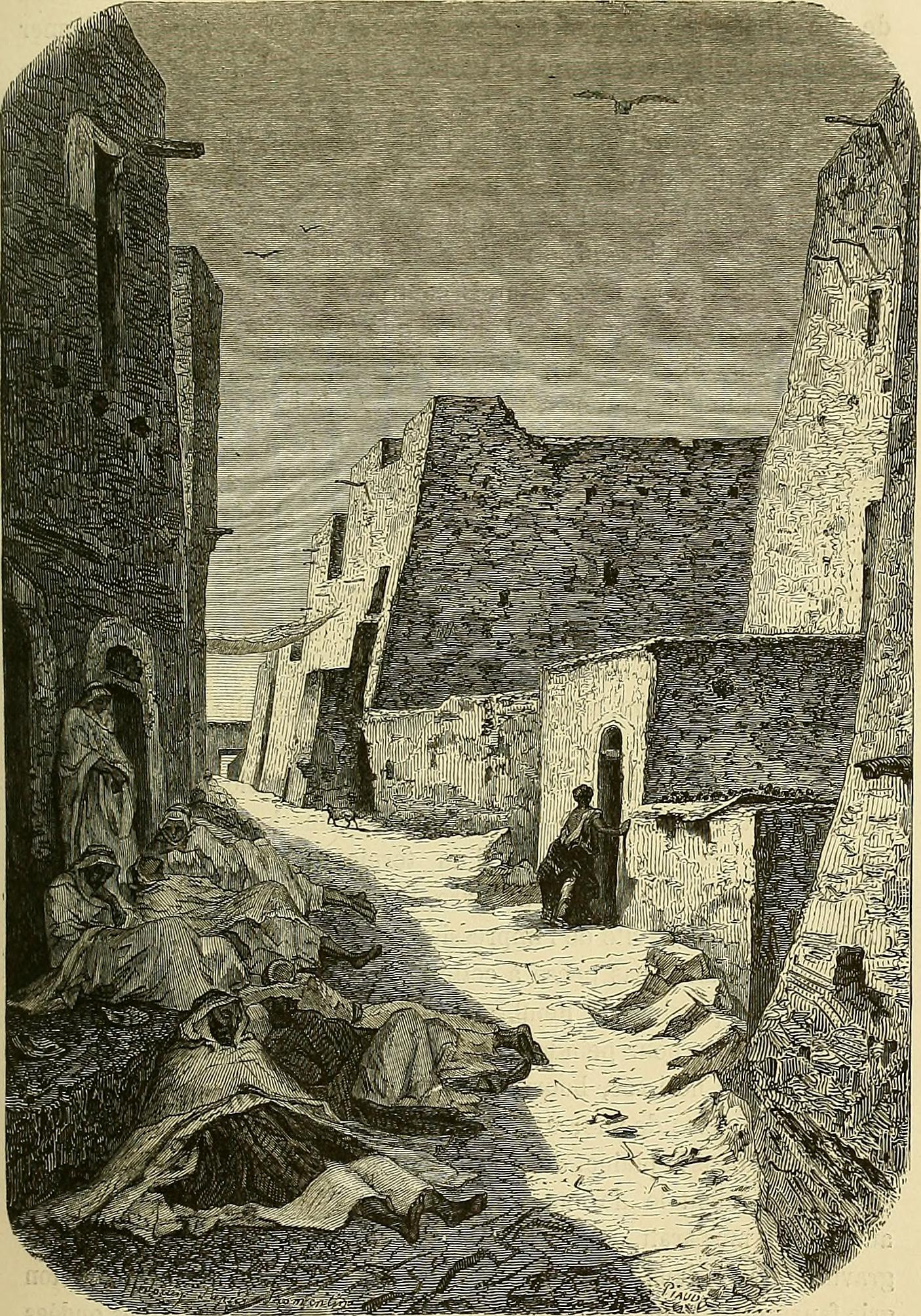
La rue Bab-el-Gharbi, à El-Aghouat, 1859

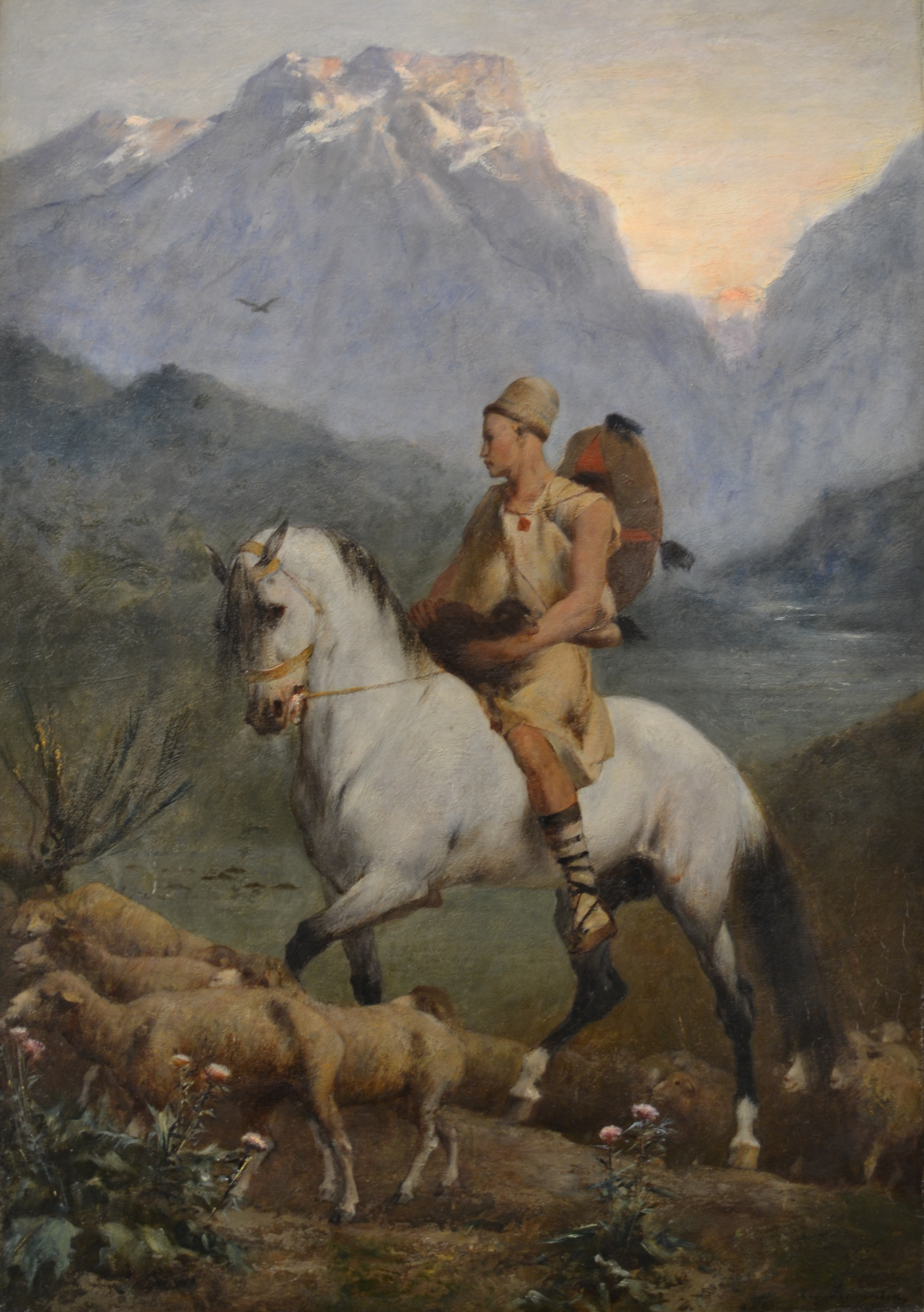
Kabyle Shepherd, 1861

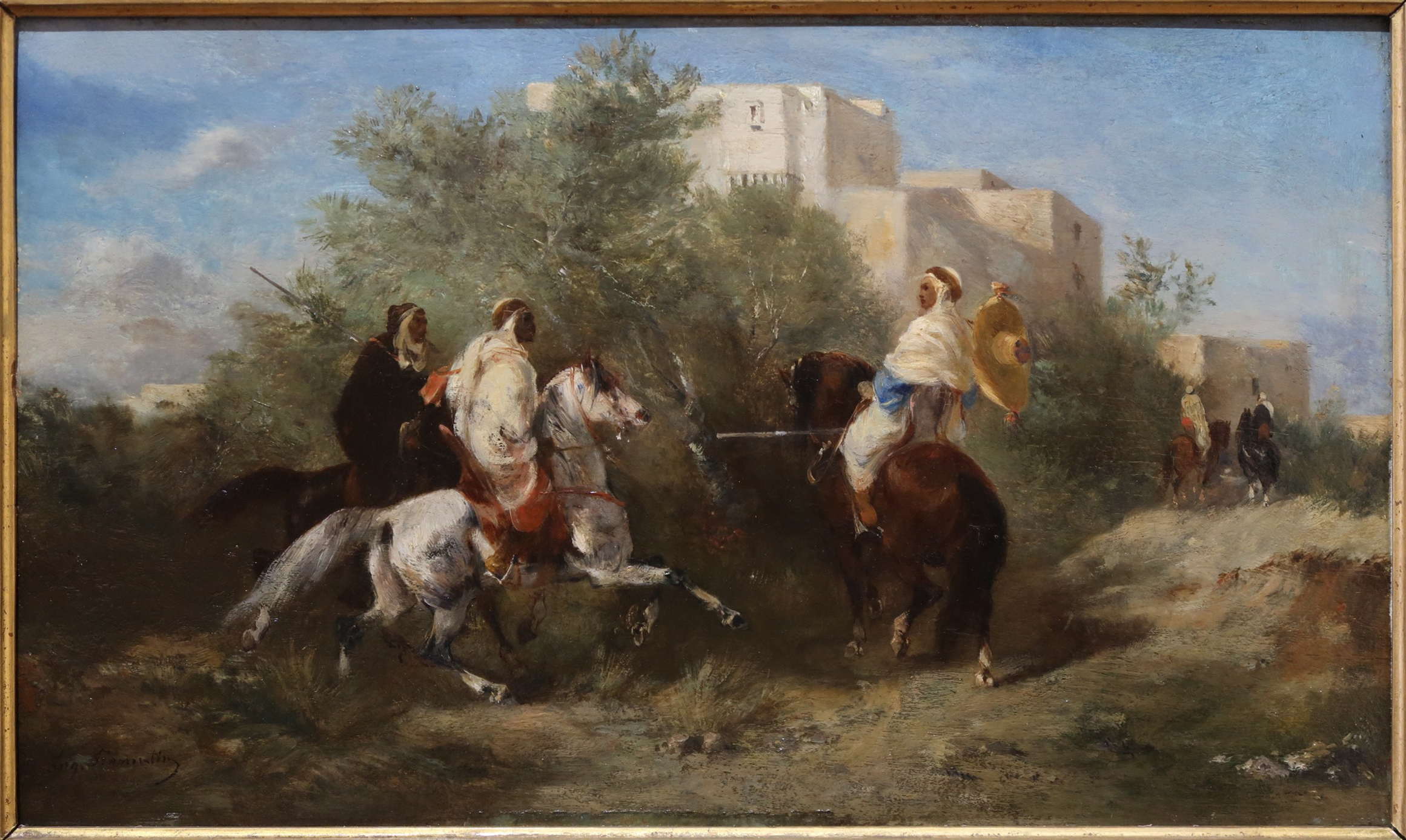
Cavaliers arabes ou la rencontre [Arab Horsemen or the Encounter], 1862

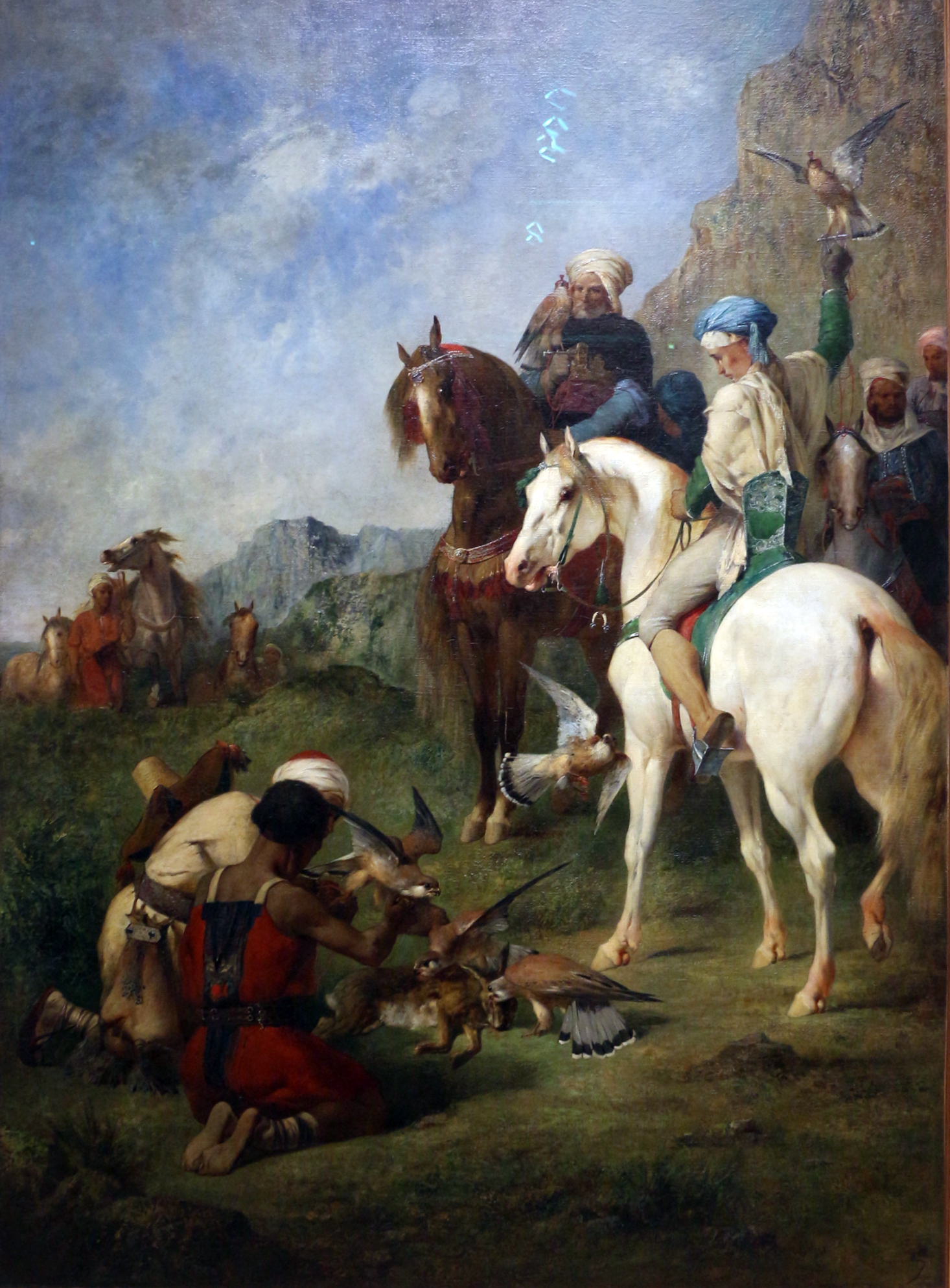

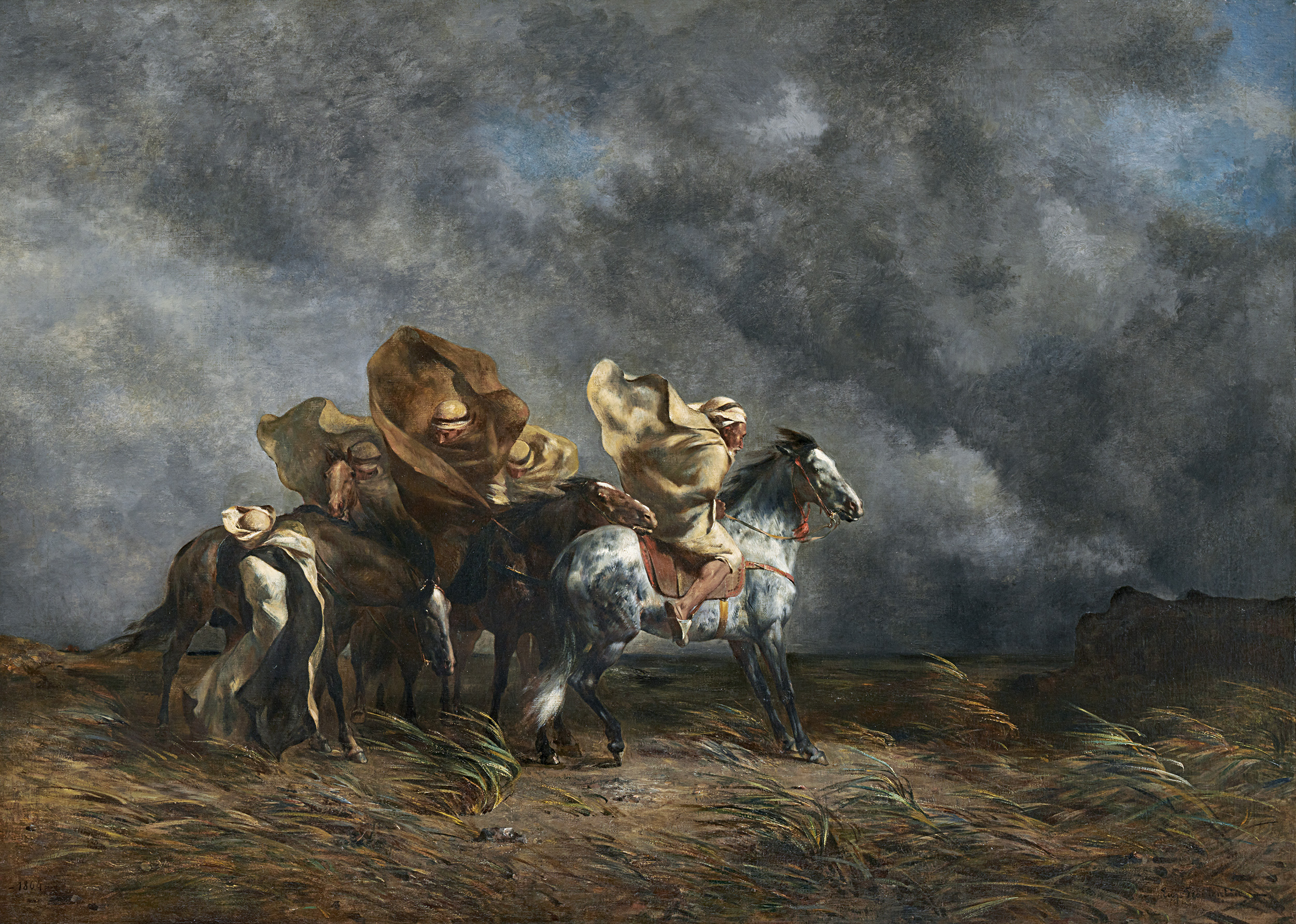
Windstorm on the Esparto Plains of the Sahara, 1864

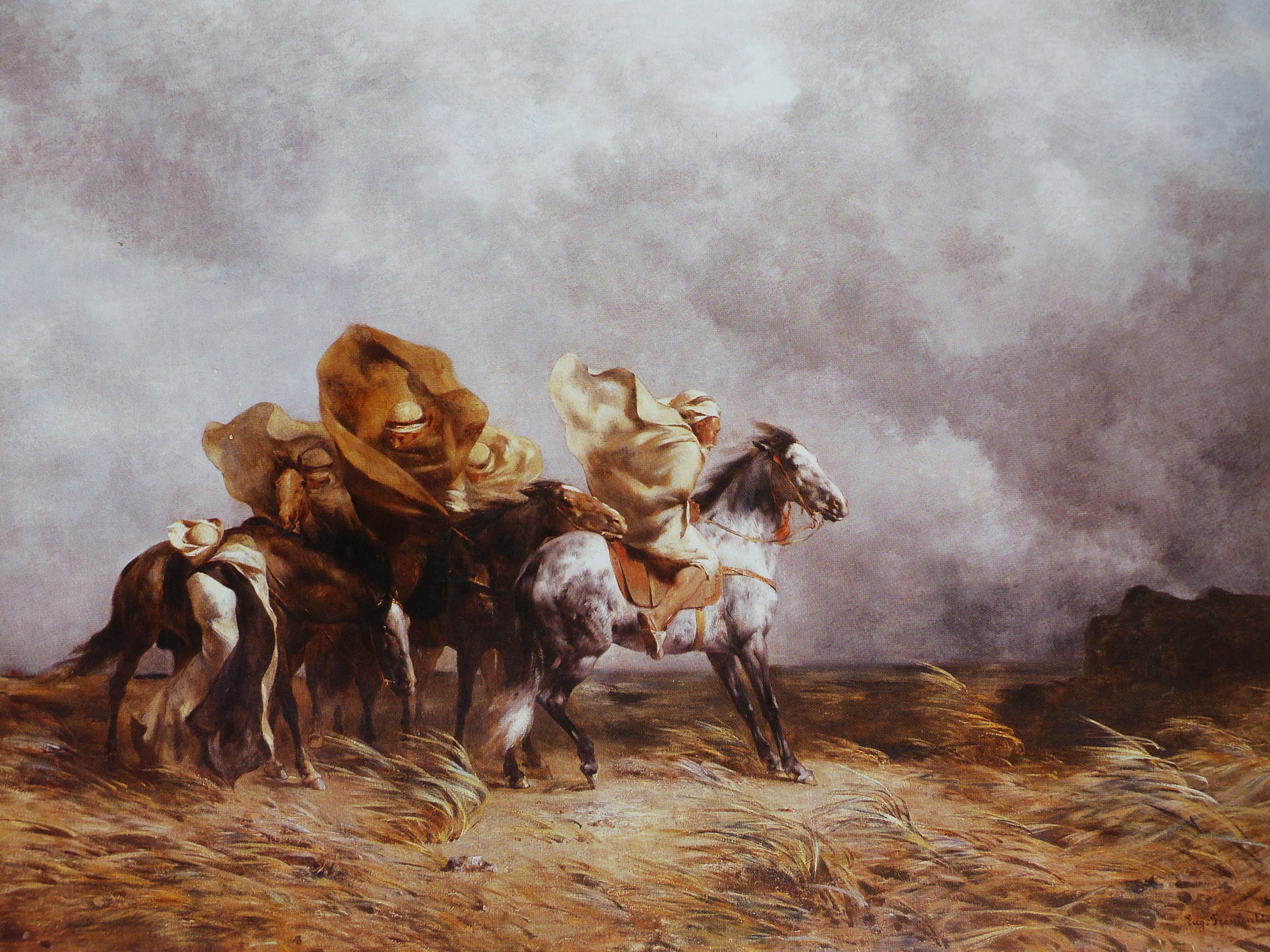
Coup de vent sur les plaines d'alfa [Gust of Wind on the Plains of Alfa], 1864

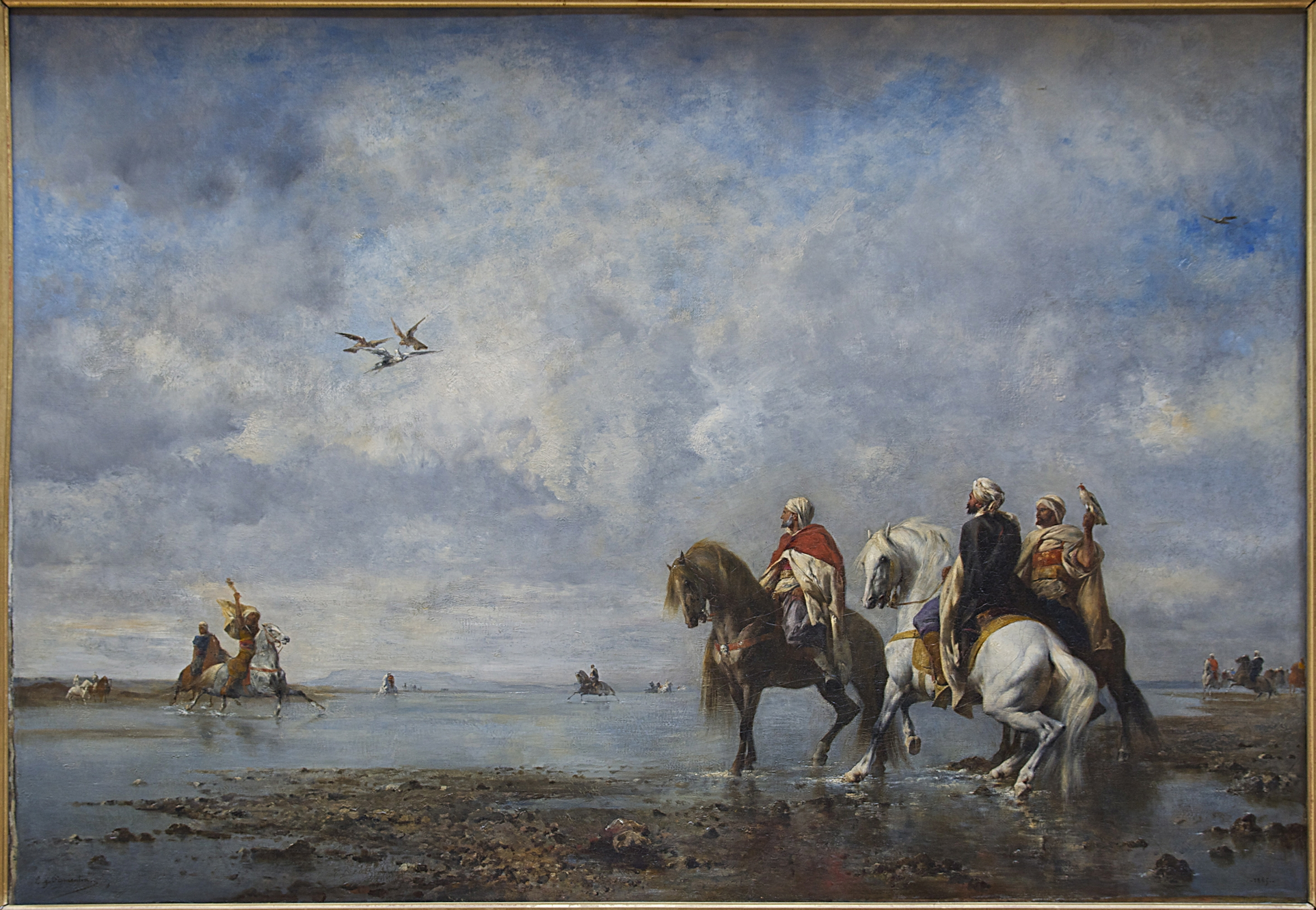
Hunting Heron, Algeria, 1865

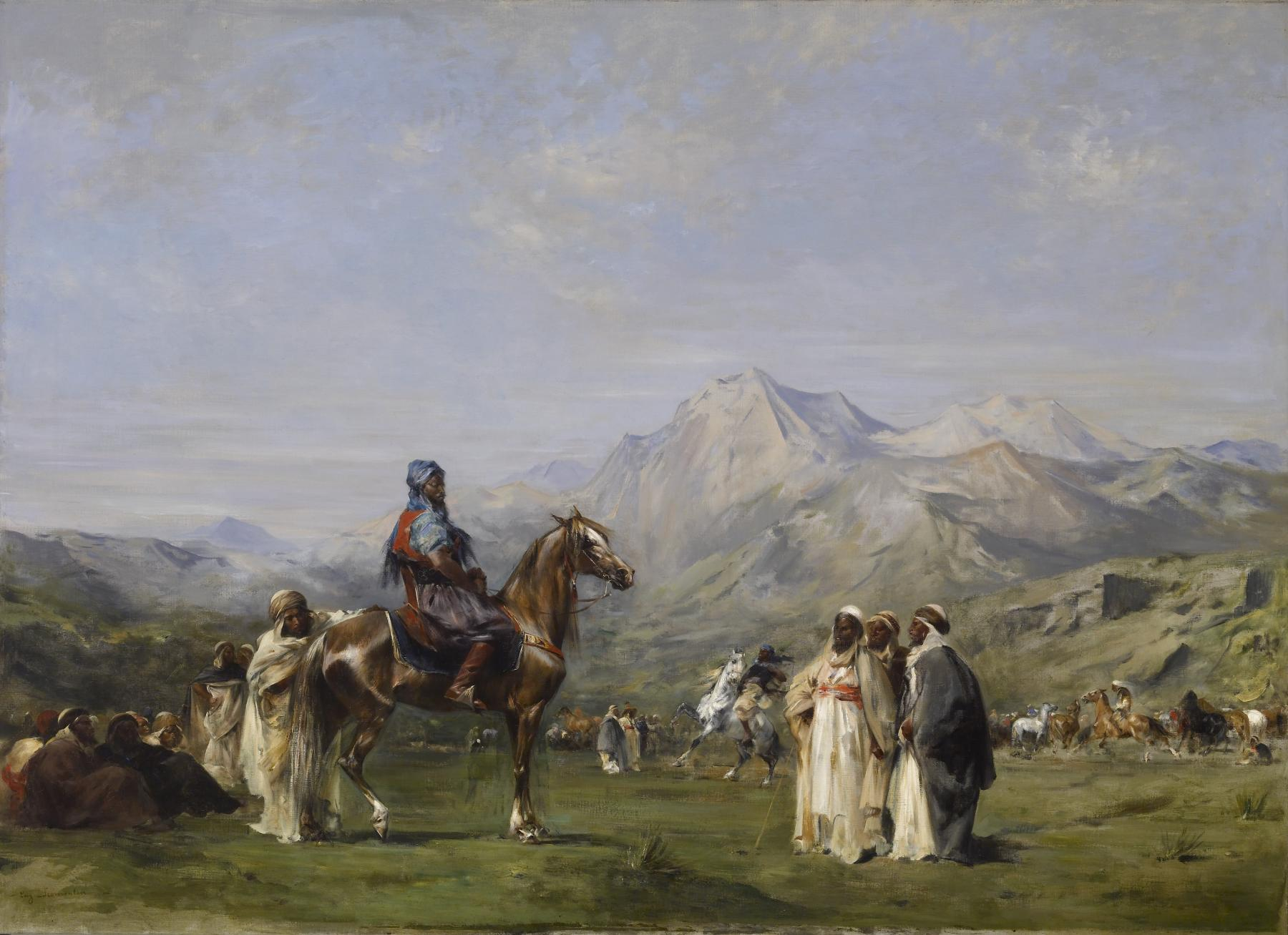
An Encampment in the Atlas Mountains, 1865

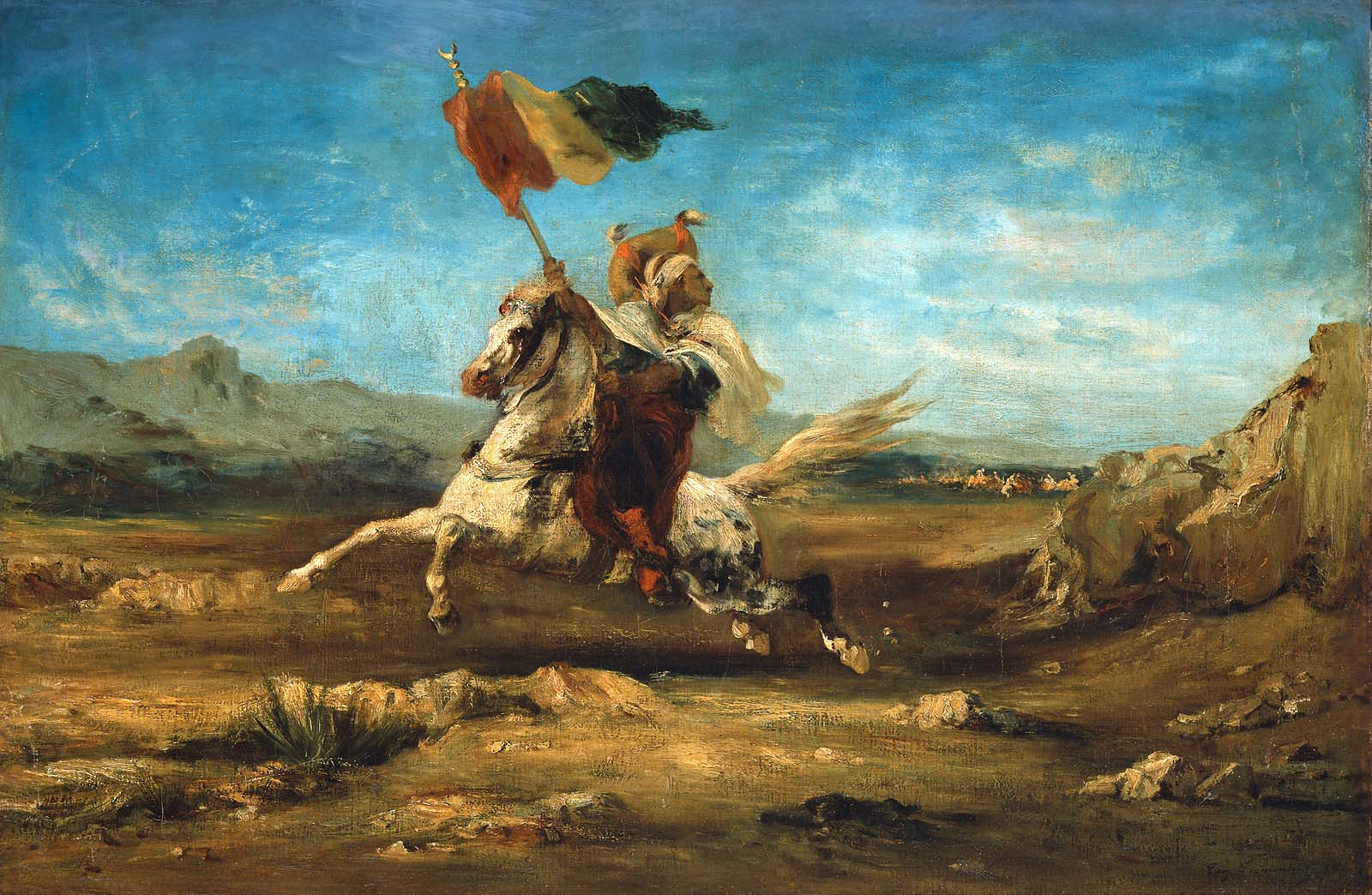
Standard Bearer, 1860 ~ 1865

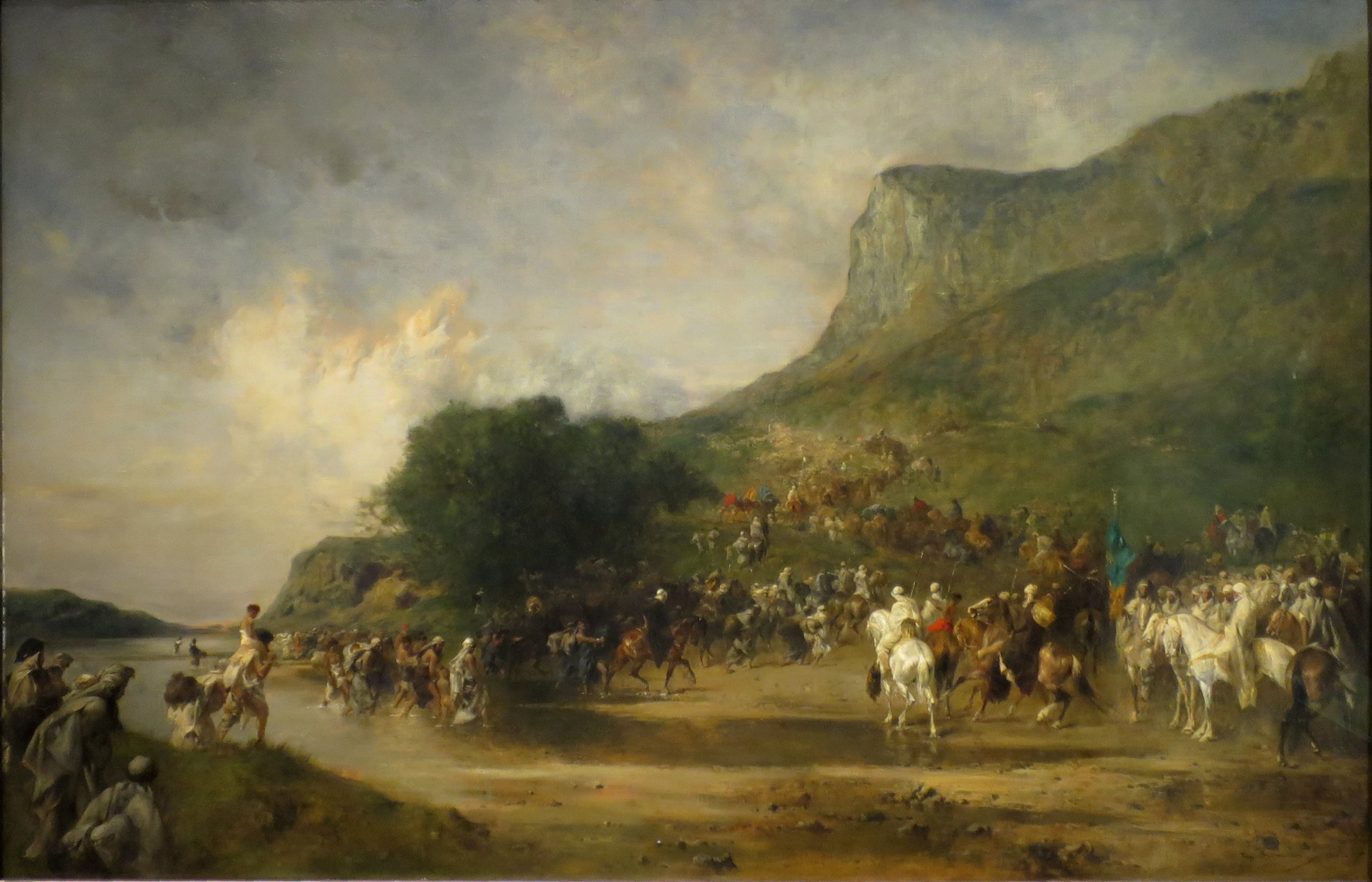
Arabs on the Way to the Pastures of the Tell, 1866

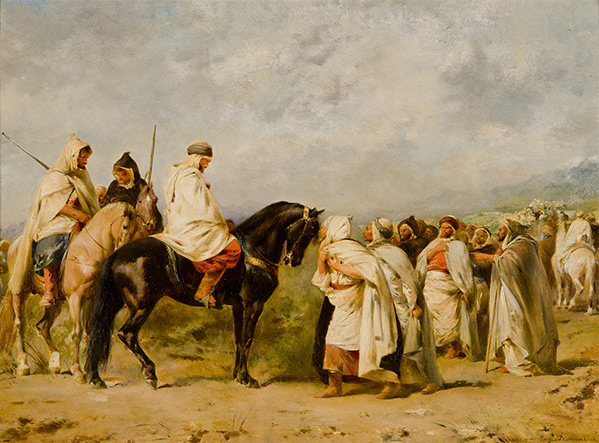
Before the Race – Fantasia or The Halt in the Desert, 1867

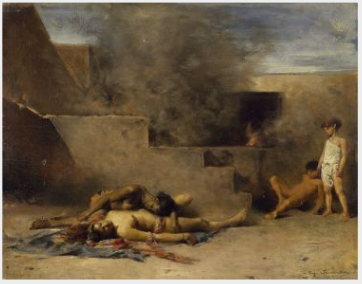
L'Incendie [The Fire], 1867

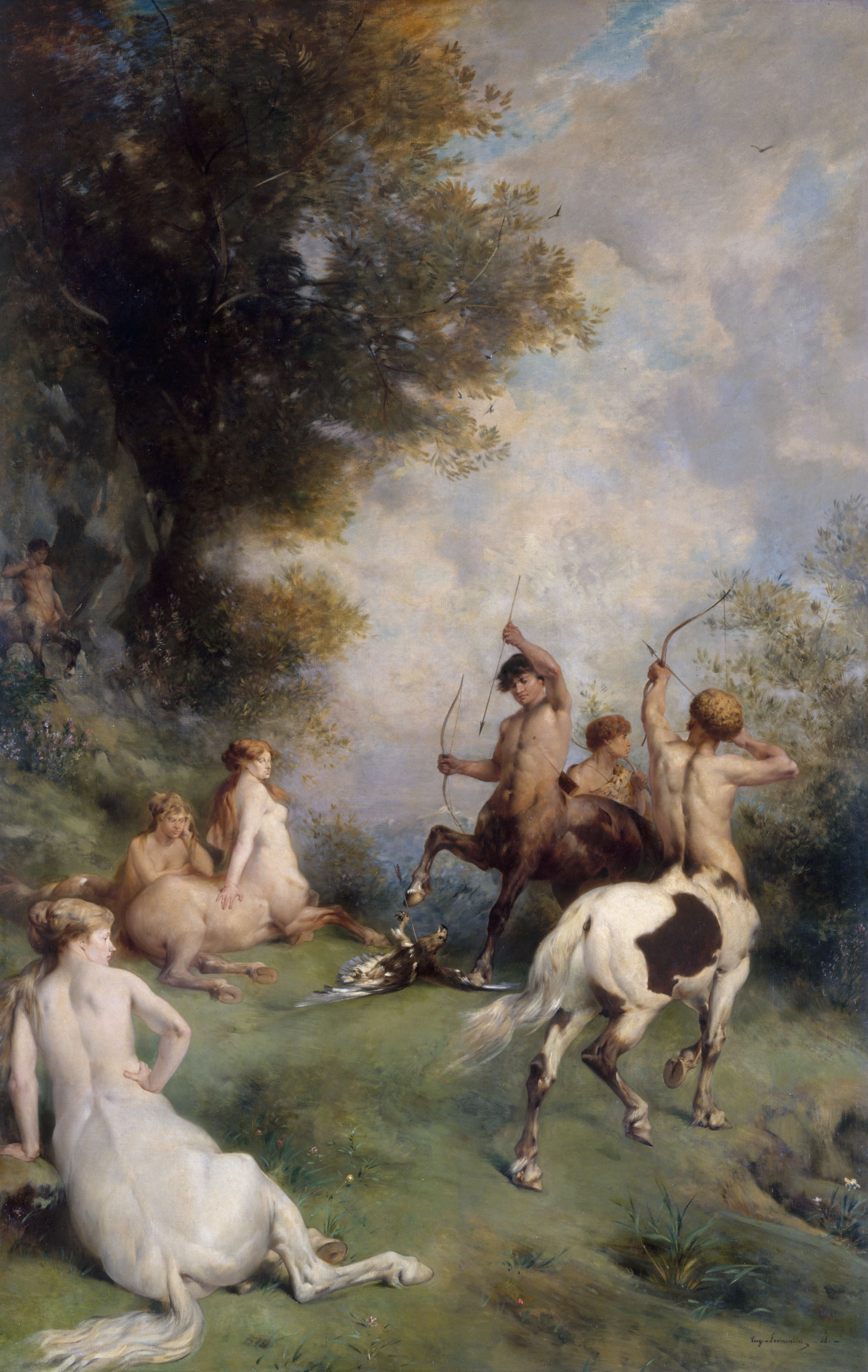
Centaures, 1868

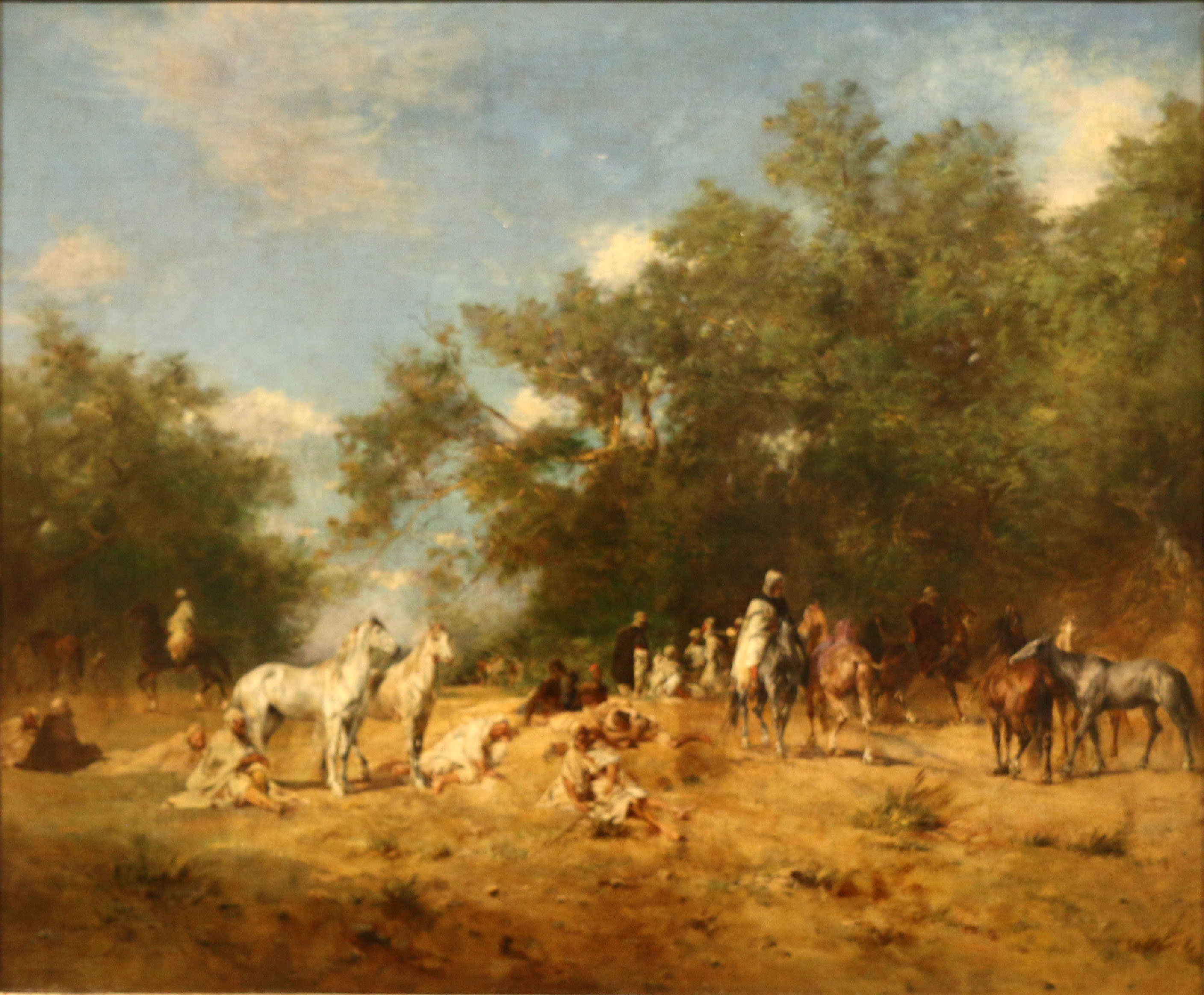
Halte de cavaliers arabes dans la forêt [Arab Horsemen Resting in the Forest], 1868

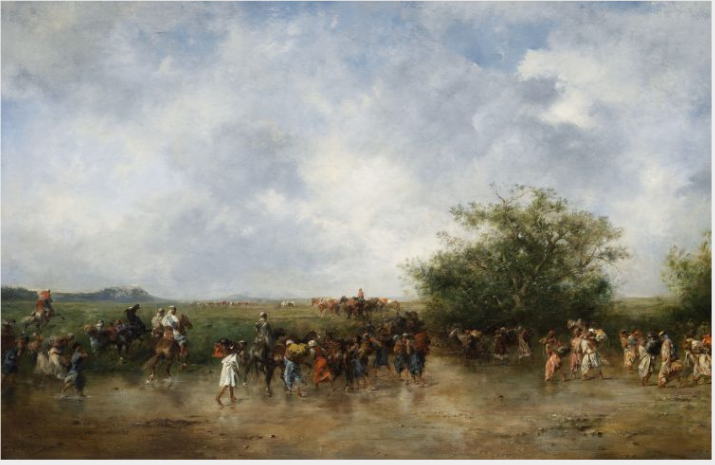
Crossing the Ford, Algeria, 1869

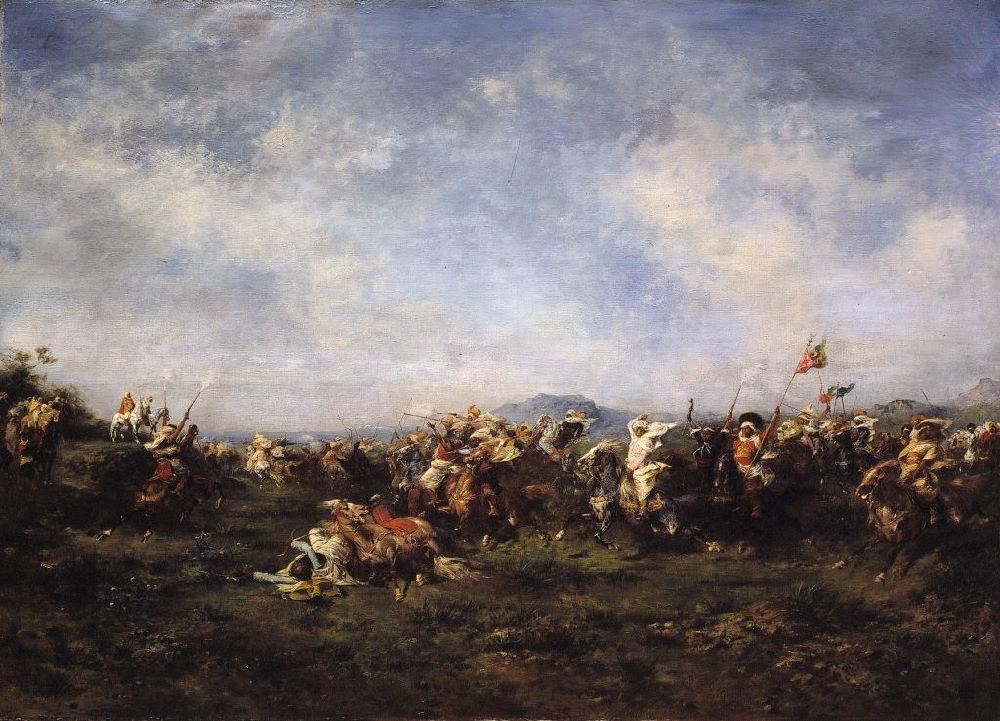
Une Fantasia [A Fantasy] – Algeria, 1869

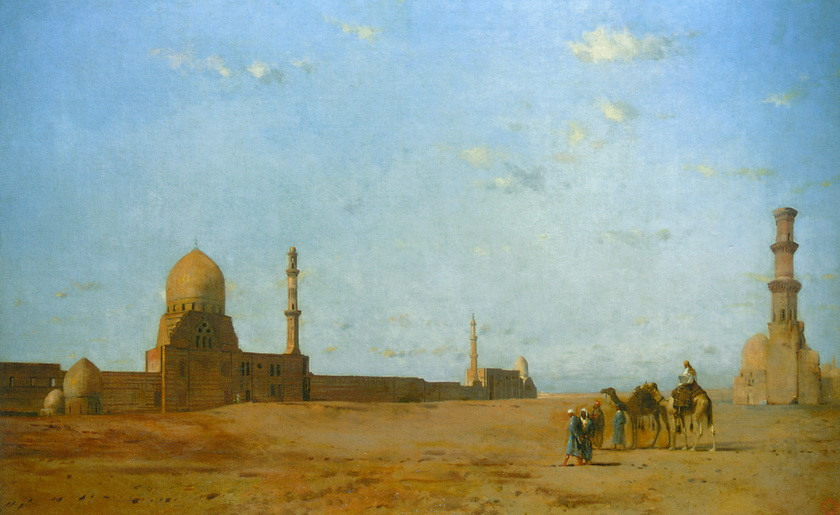
Les tombeaux des Califes au Caire [The Tombs of the Caliphs in Cairo], ca. 1870

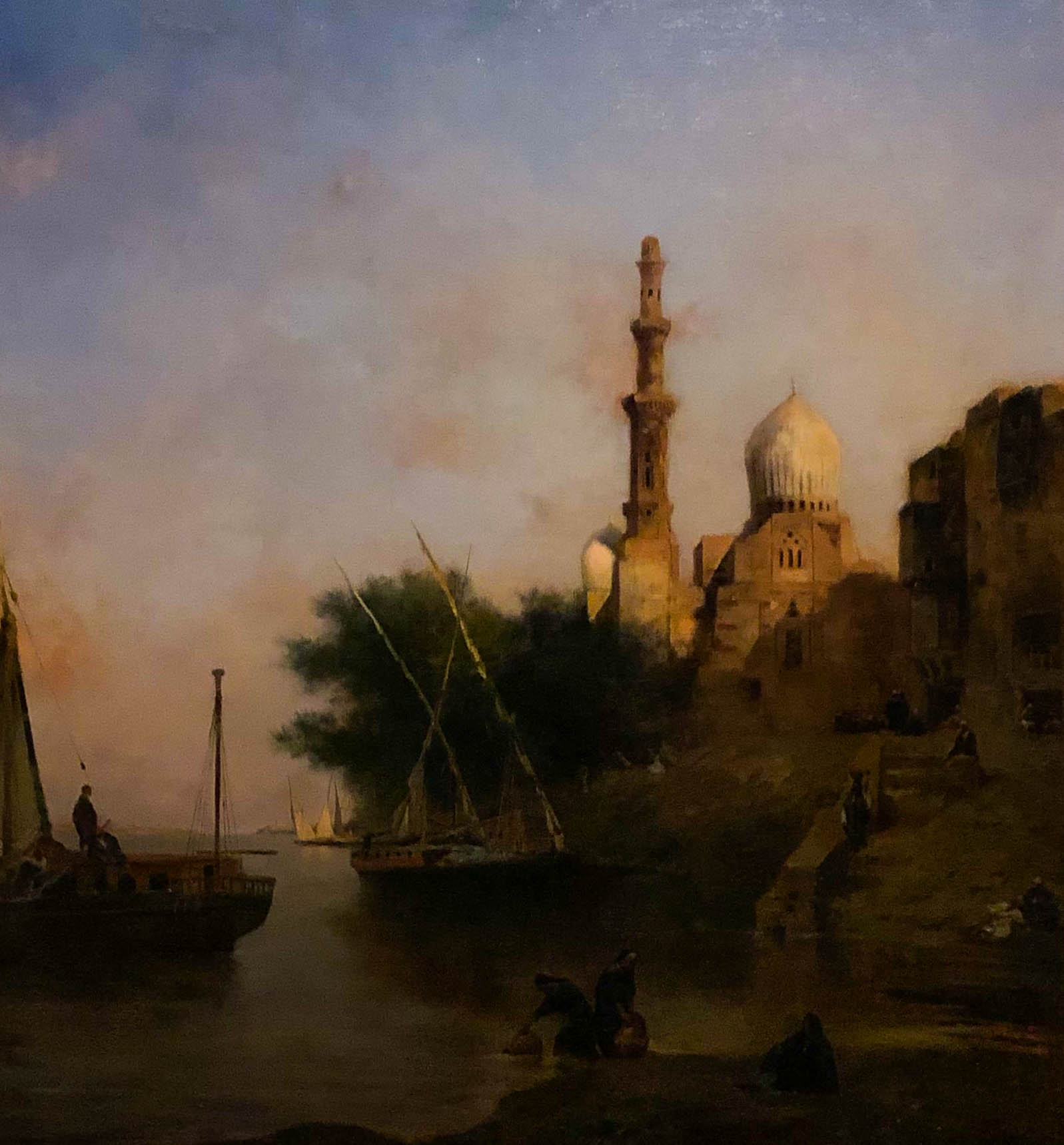
Nil çayı (Turkish) [Nile Tea], 1870

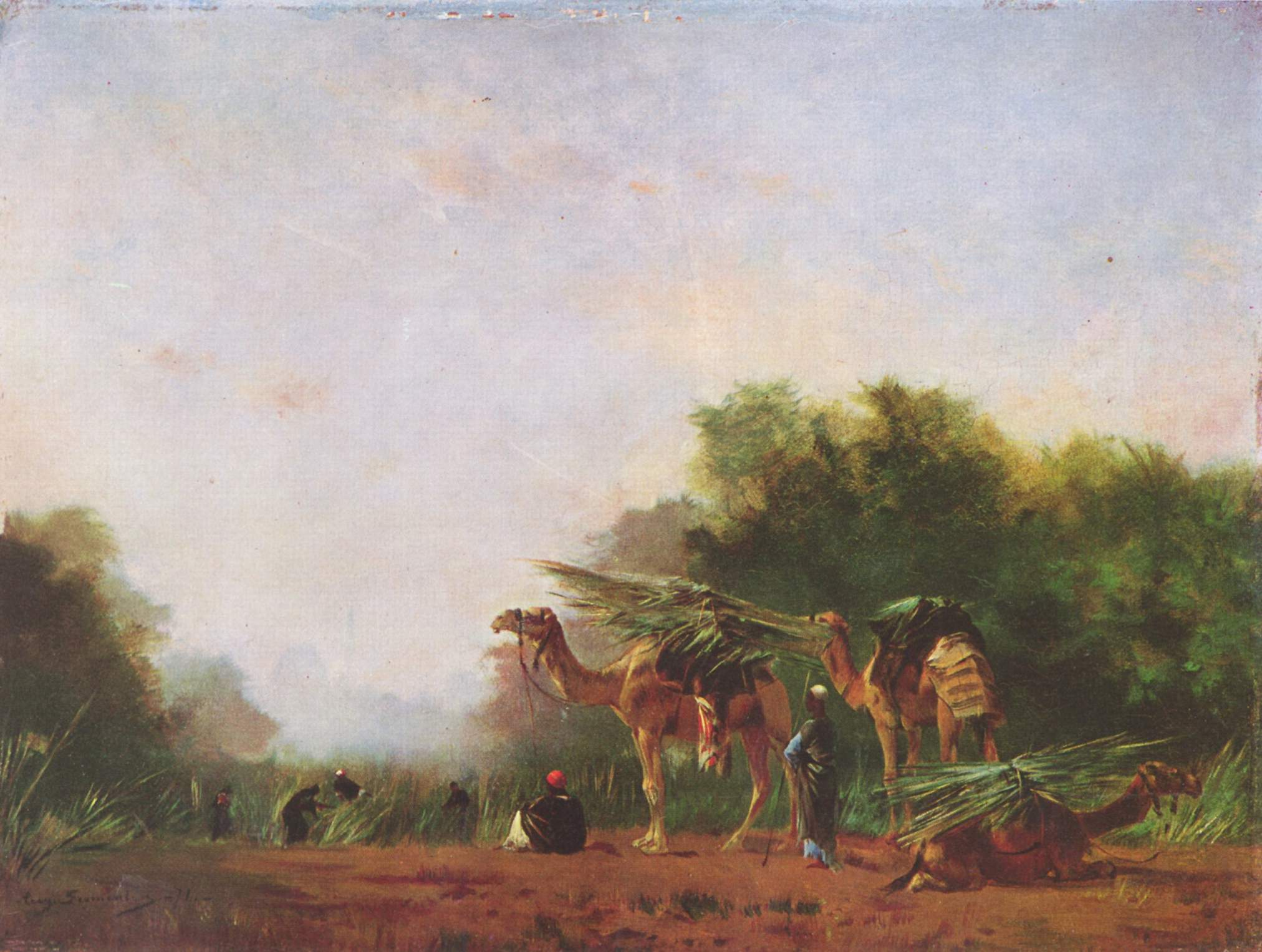
Arabs, 1871

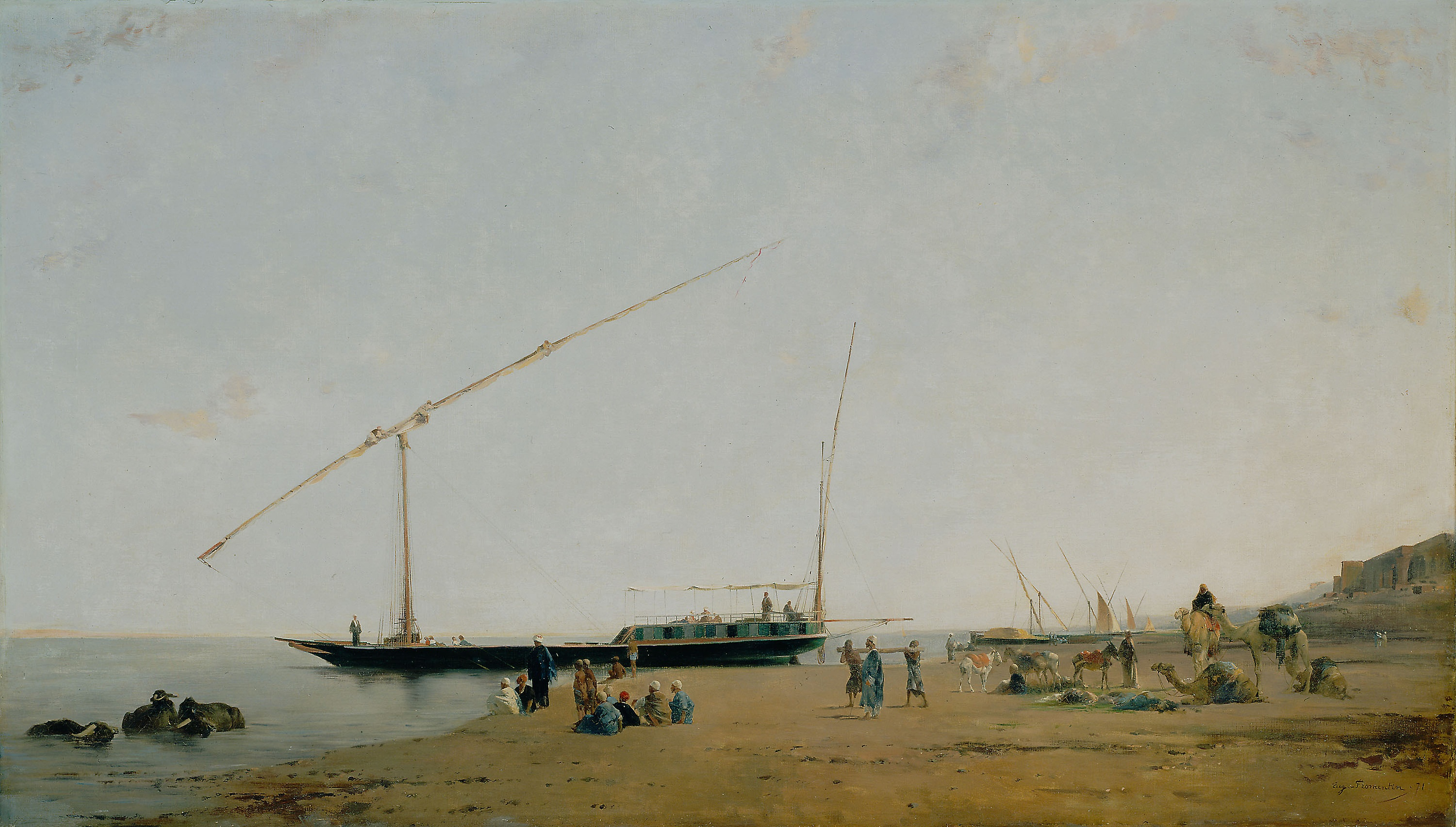
On the Nile, Near Philae, 1871

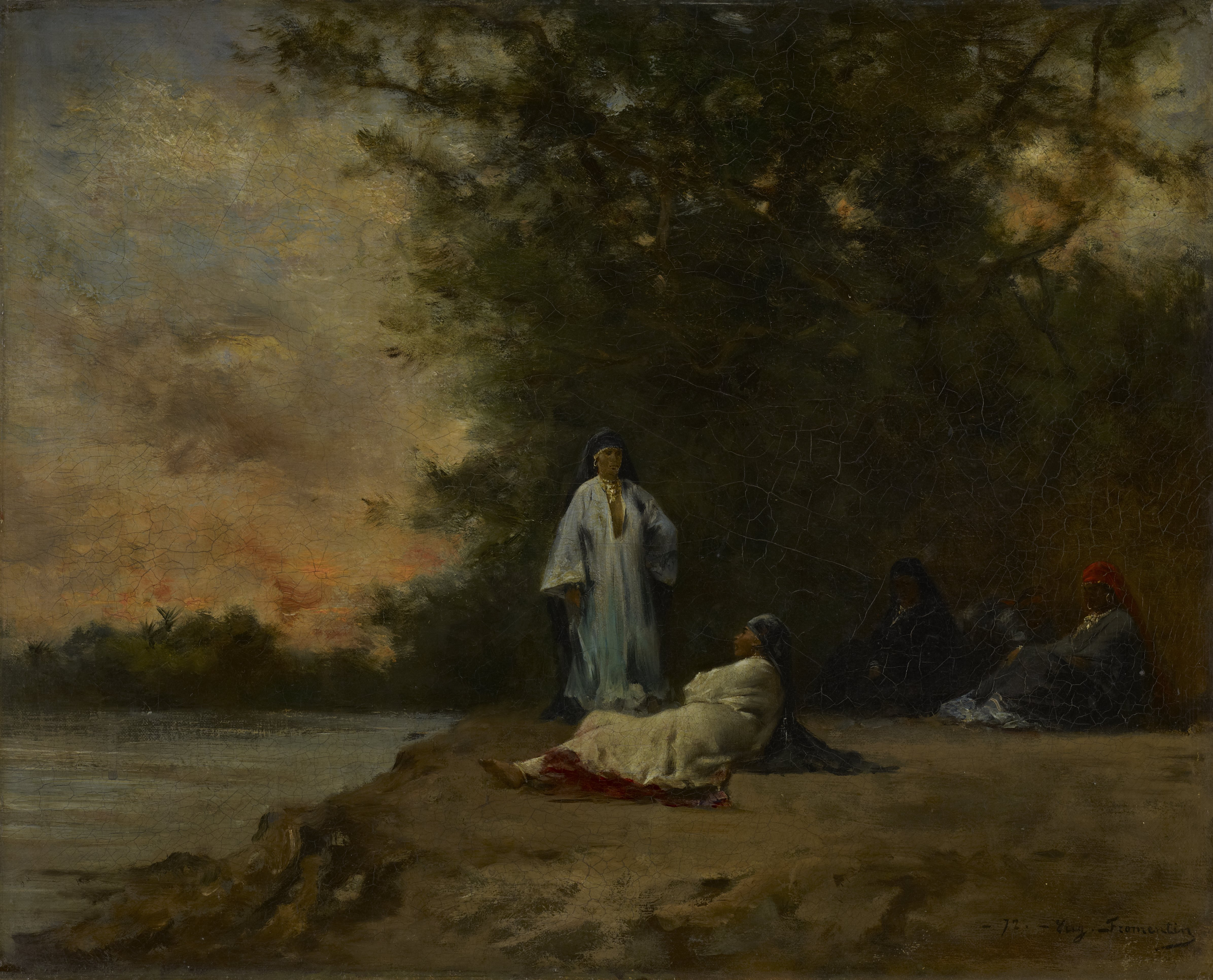
Orientals [Egyptian Females], 1872

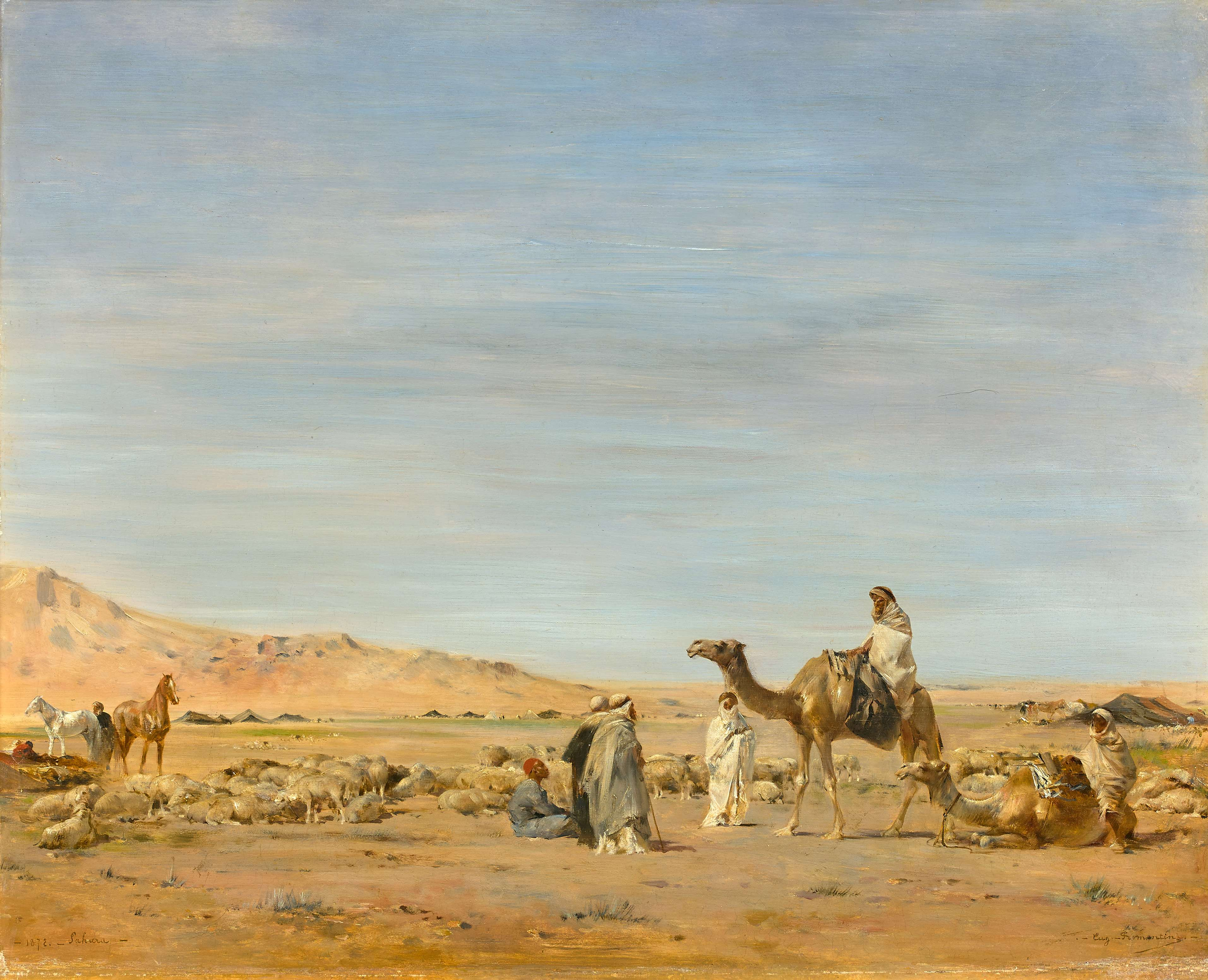
Campement dans le Sahara [Campsite in the Sahara], 1872

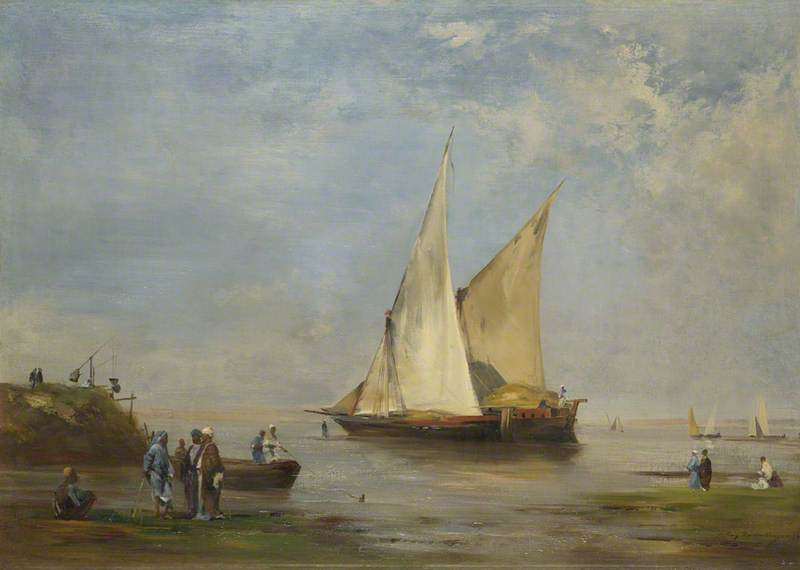
The Banks of the Nile, 1874

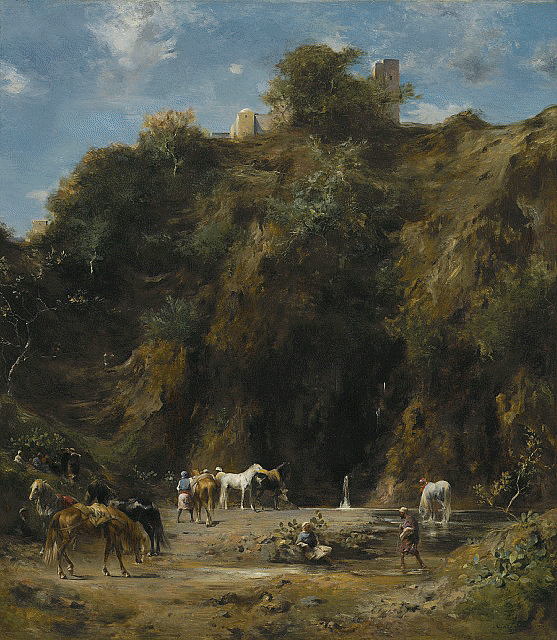
Un ravin : souvenir d'Algérie [A Ravine: Souvenir of Algeria], 1875

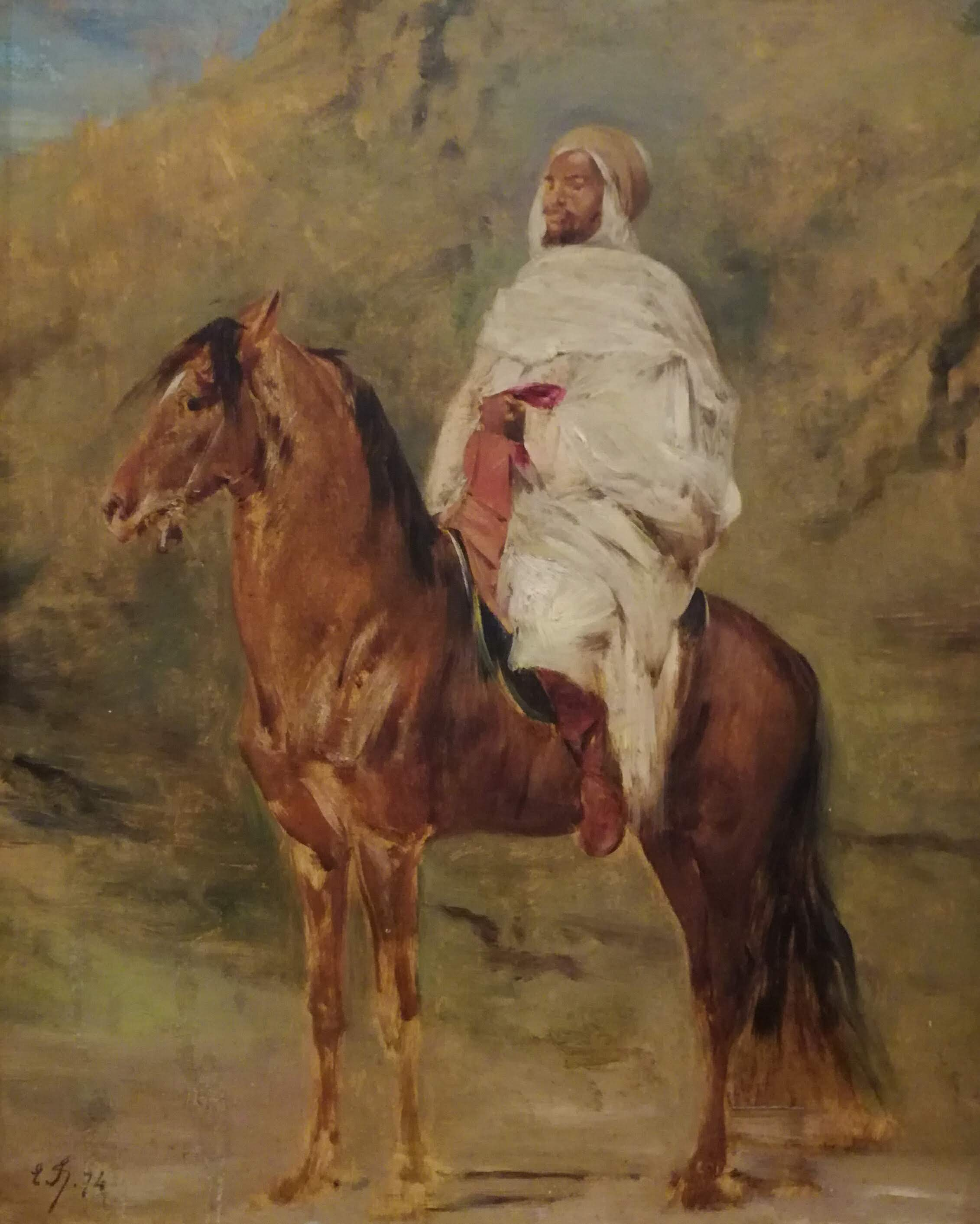
Cavalier peint en Algérie [Painted Rider in Algeria], 1875

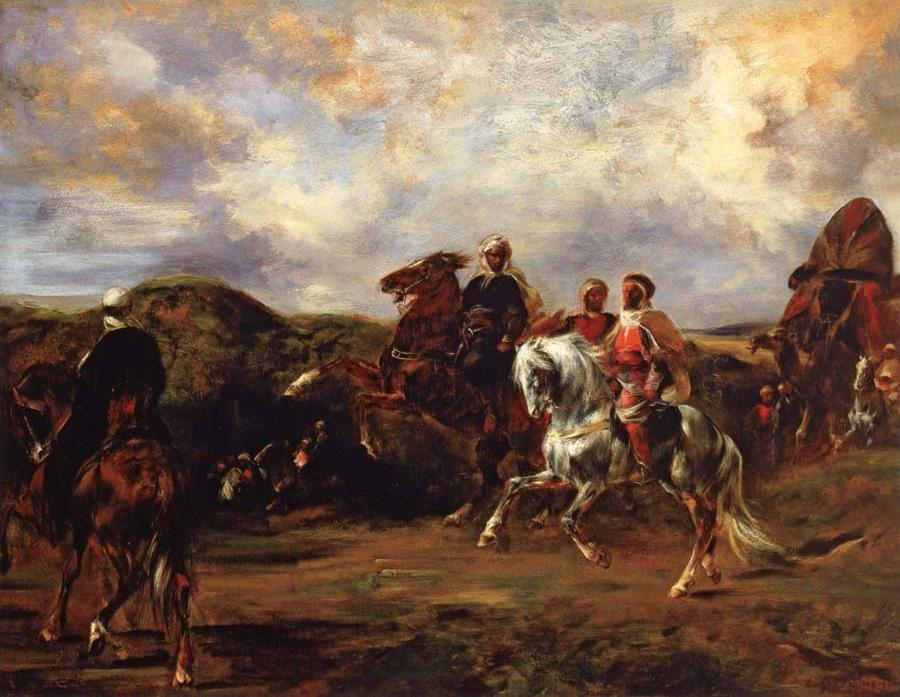
La caravane (scène de la vie nomade des Larbaâ Laghouat) [The Caravan (Scene From the Nomadic Life of the Larbaâ Laghouat)], 1875

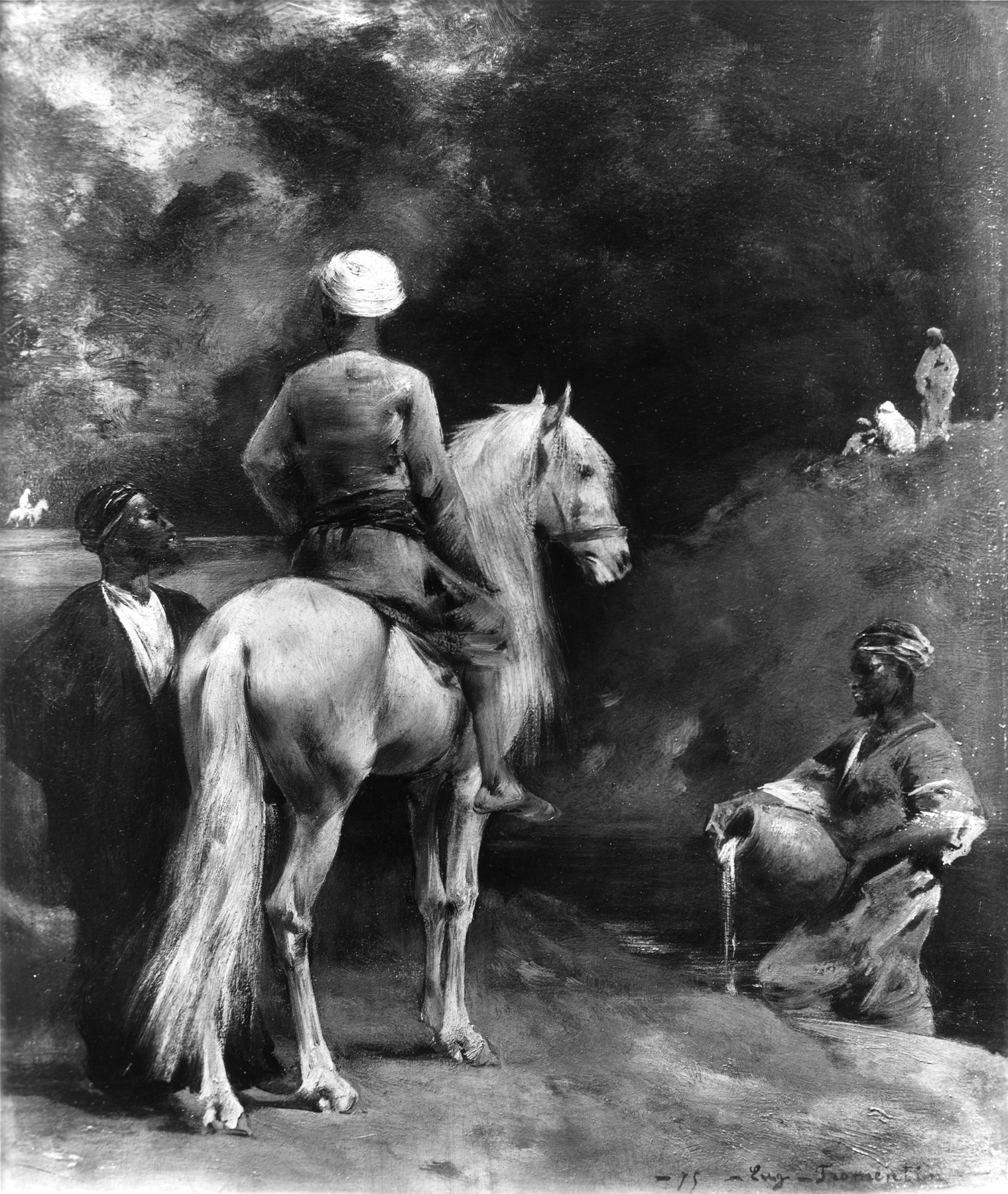
At the Well, 1875

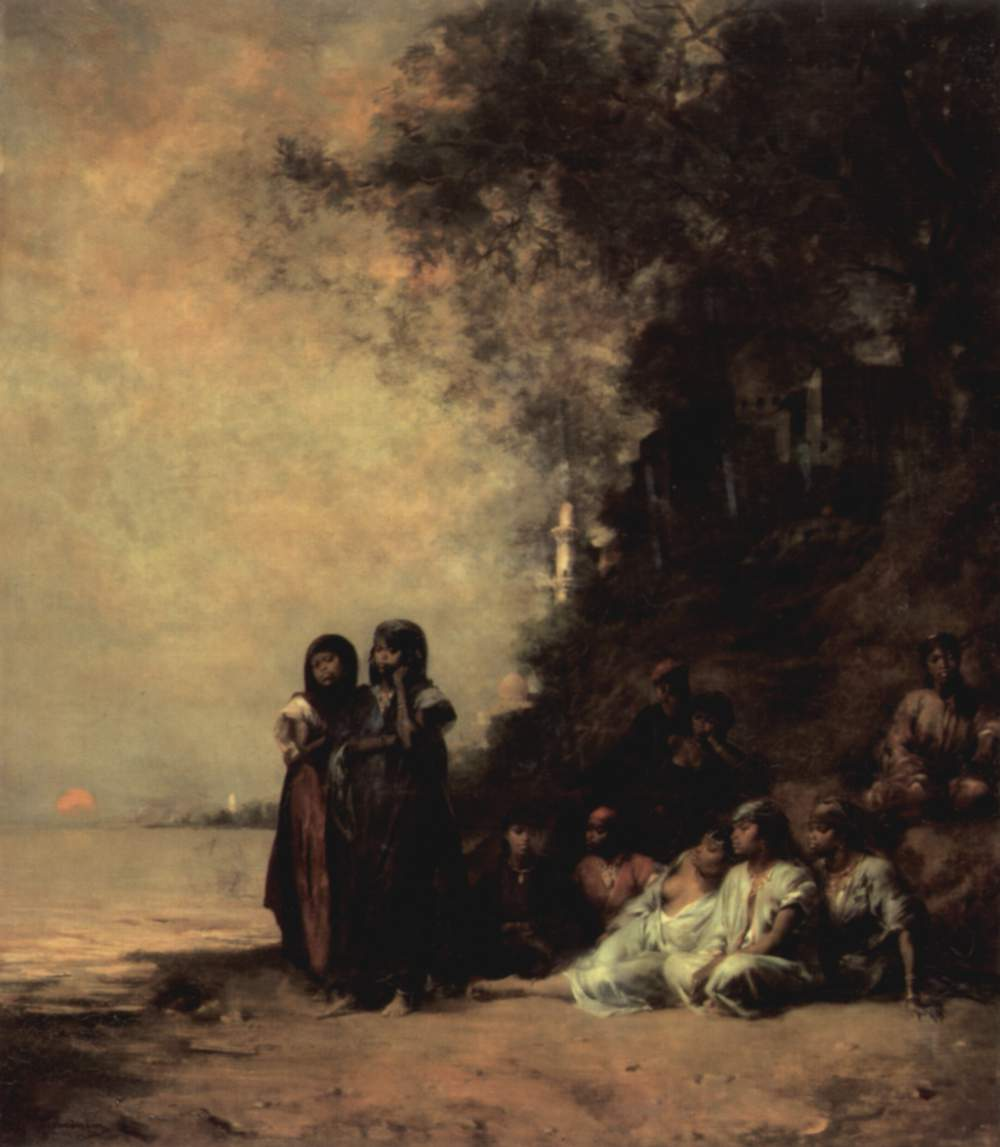
Un Souvenir d'Esneh [A memory of Esneh], 1876

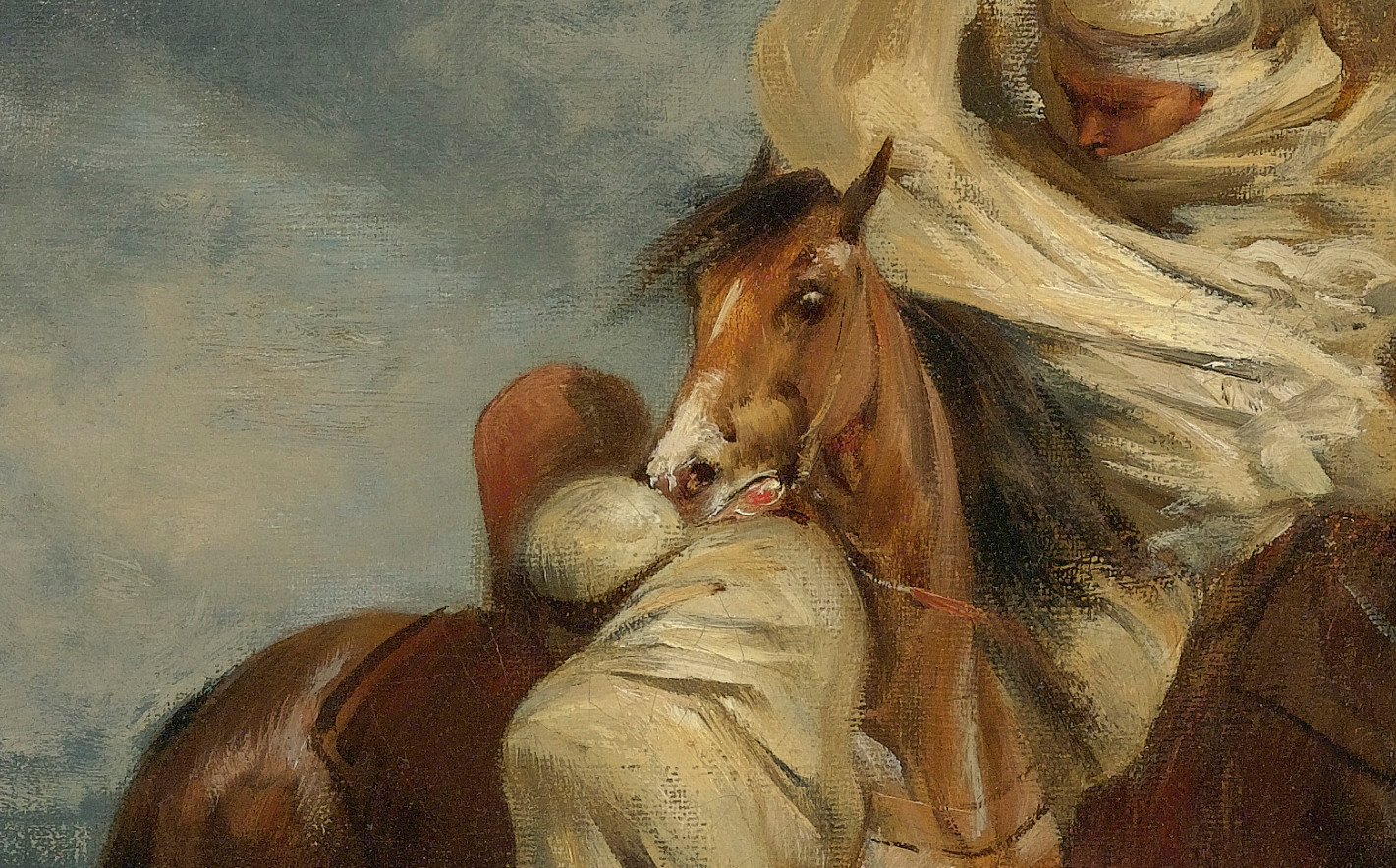
Le Simoun [The Simoun], 1876

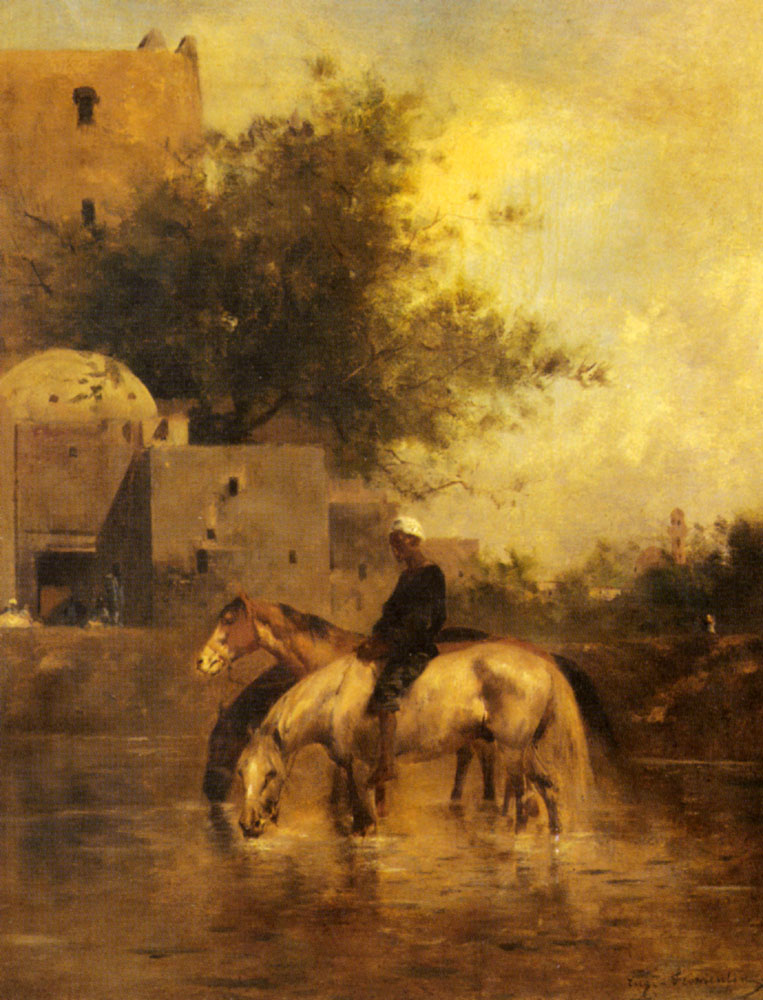
Horses Watering in a River, undated

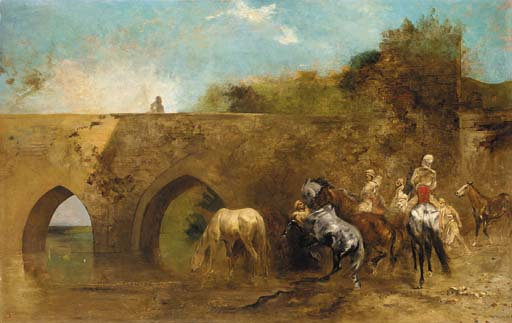
Bedouins Watering Their Horses, undated

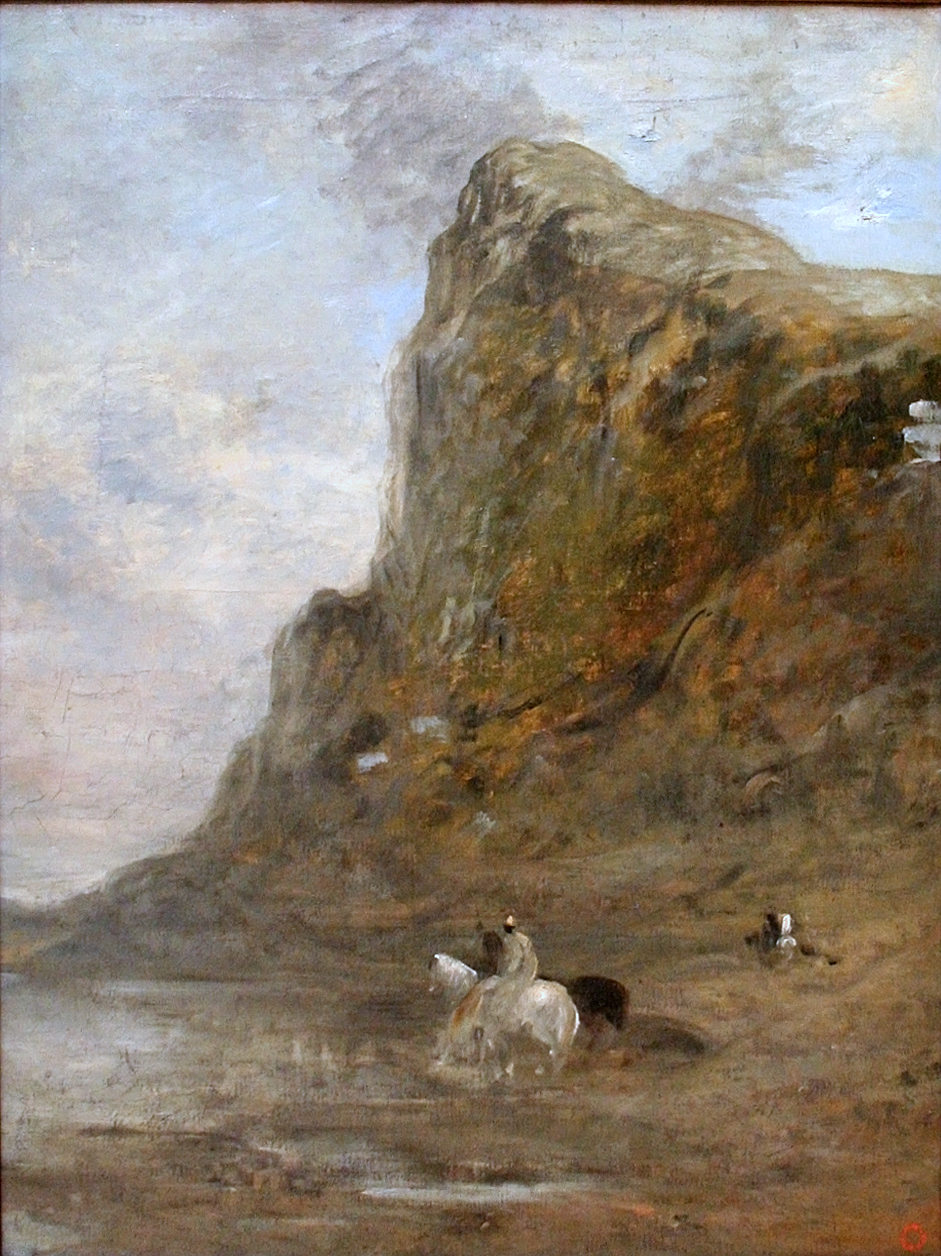
Moroccan Horsemen at the Foot of the Chiffra Cliffs, undated

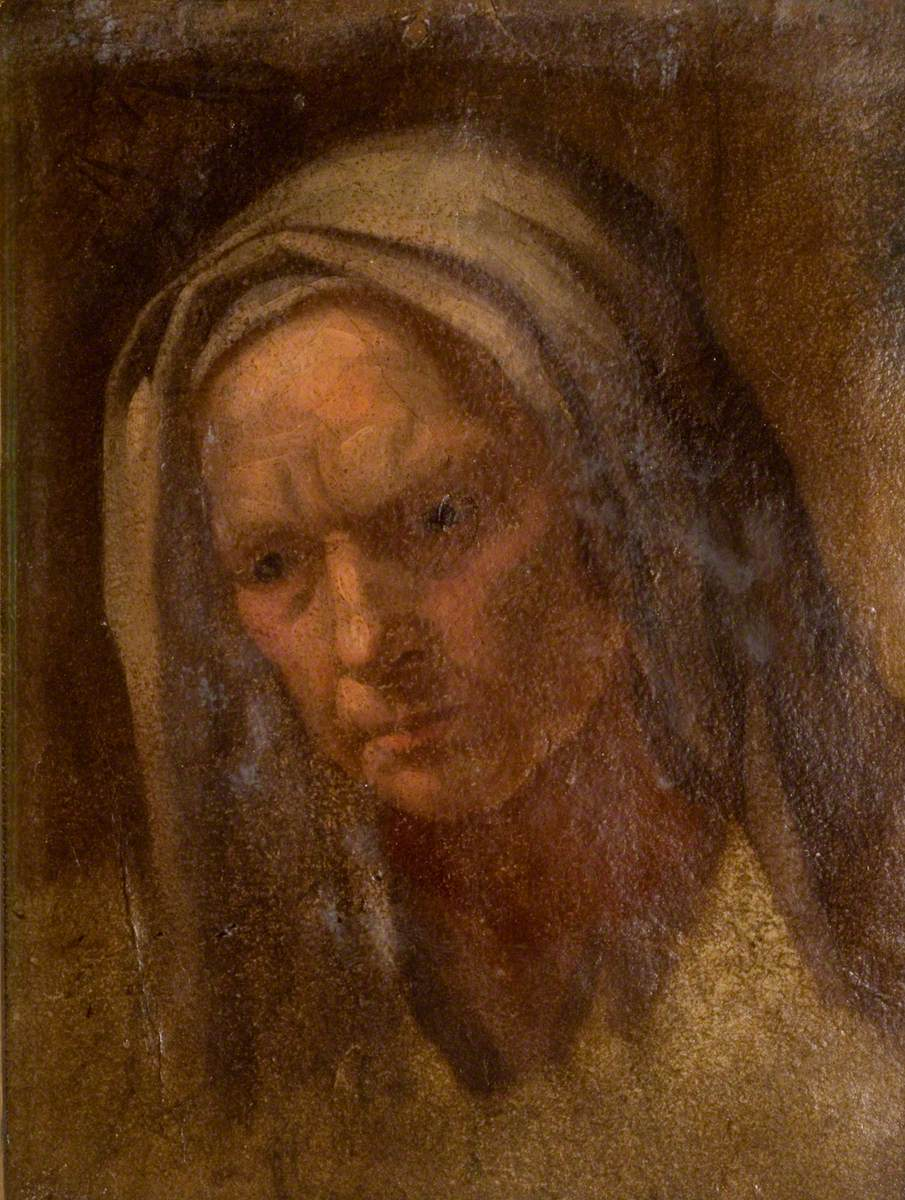
Head of an Old Woman, undated

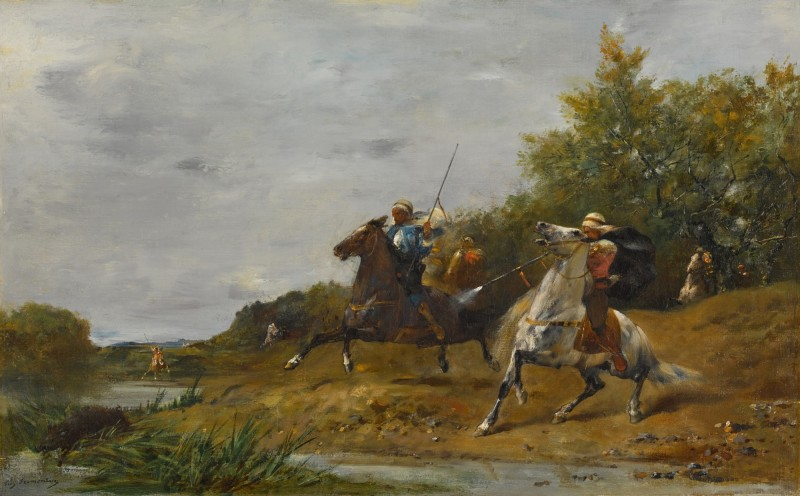
The Boar Hunt, undated

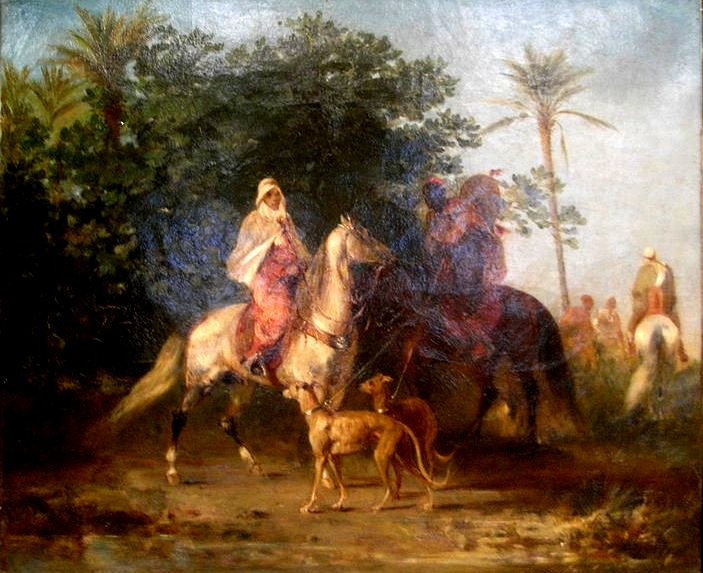
Départ pour la chasse [Departure for the hunt], undated

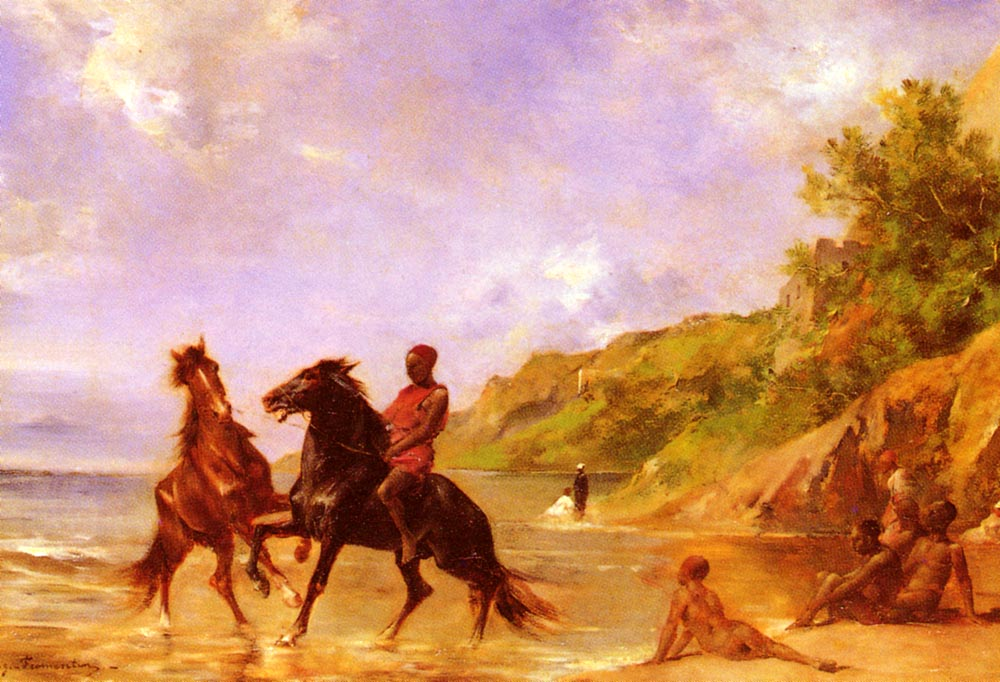
On the Nile, undated

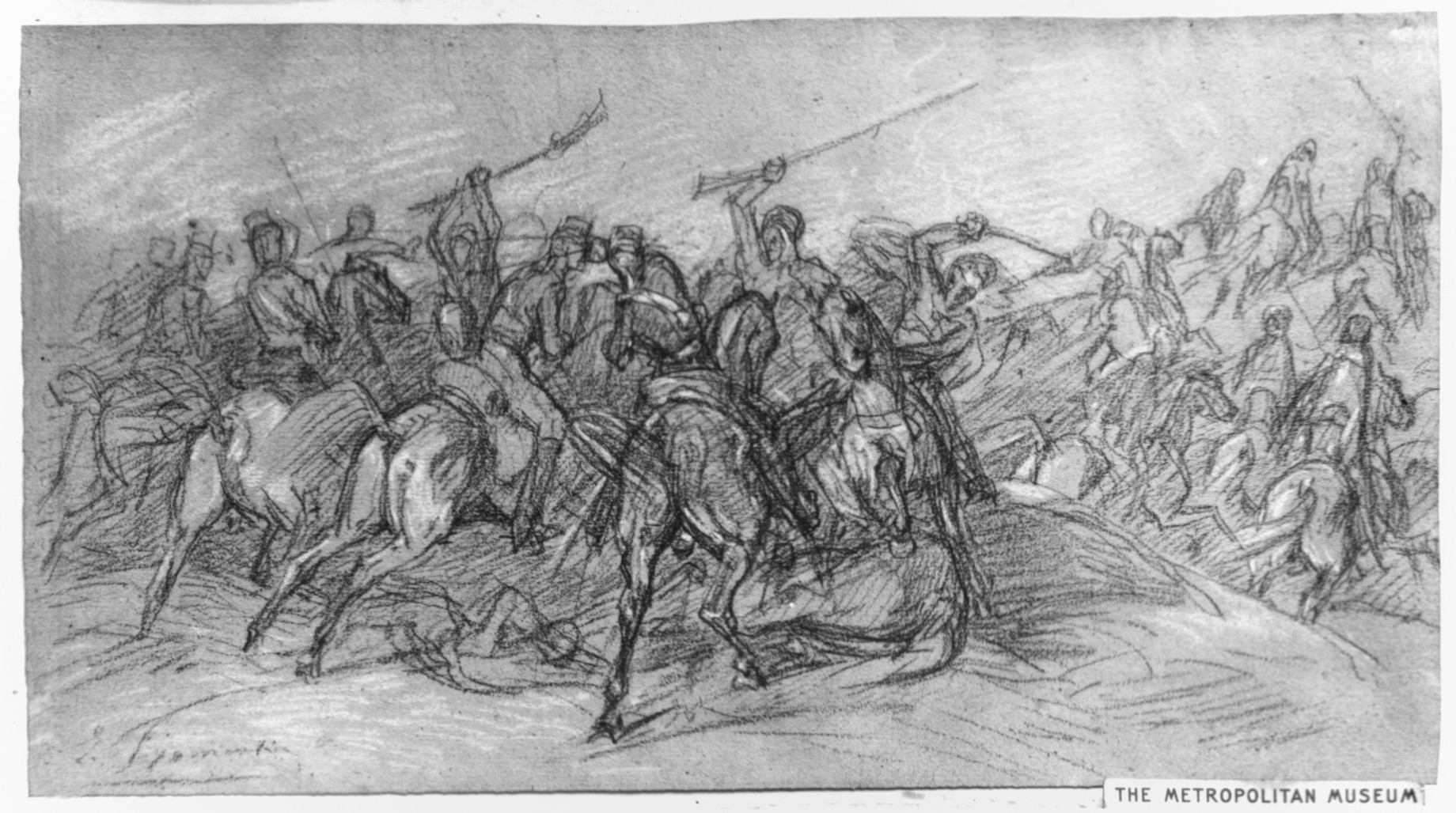
Arab Skirmish, undated

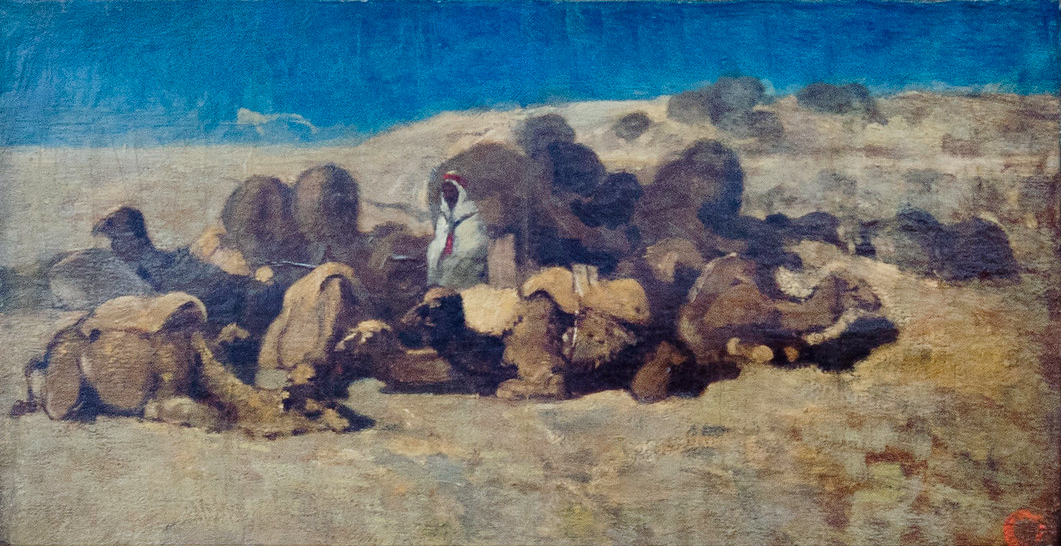
Le repos des chameaux [The Camels Rest], undated

== See also ==
- List of Orientalist artists
- Orientalism
- The Land of Thirst

== Bibliography ==
=== Inline references ===
- Berenson, Bernard; Gardner, Isabella Stewart (1987). "Letter dated March 18, 1888". In Hadley, Rollin Van Nostrand Jr. (ed.). The Letters of Bernard Berenson and Isabella Stewart Gardner, 1887–1924. Boston: Northeastern University Press. p. 19 – via ISSUU. LCCN 86-12554; ISBN 0-9303-5089-8, 978-0-9303-5089-5; OCLC 13642807 (all editions), 875477150.
- Chisholm, Hugh, ed. (1911) [1910–1911]. "Fromentin, Eugène". Encyclopædia Britannica (28 Vols. + Index). A Dictionary of Arts, Sciences, Literature and General Information. Vol. 11 (of 28): "Franciscans to Gibson" (11th ed.). New York: Encyclopædia Britannica, Inc. pp. 246–247. Retrieved July 27, 2004. LCCN 11-27773; ISSN 0002-7294; OCLC 266598 (all editions).
1. See
2. Encyclopædia Britannica, 11th ed.
3. Via Google Books (Michigan).
4. Via Google Books (Iowa).
5. Via Google Books (Penn State).
6. Via Google Books (Hoover Institution).
- Du Camp, Maxime, ed. (1859). Le salon de 1859 (in French). Paris: A. Bourdilliat et C^{ie}, éditeurs (Achille Bourdilliat; 1818–1882). Paris: Librairie nouvelle, Boulevard des Italiens, 15. p. 120 – via BnF, Gallica. Retrieved October 15, 2024. OCLC 780169510 (all editions), 1254787485, 1449097819, and 1449097633.
1. Via BnF (Gallica). 1859.
2. Via HathiTrust (Princeton).
3. Via Google Books (Lyon Public Library).
- Fromentin, Eugène (1913) [1876]. The Masters of Past Time or Criticism on the Old Flemish & Dutch Painters [uncredited translation of Les maîtres d'autrefois]. London: J.M. Dent & Sons, Ltd. (Joseph Malaby Dent; 1849–1926). New York: E.P. Dutton & Co. (Edward Payson Dutton; 1831–1923). Printed by Ballantyne, Hanson & Co. at the Ballantyne Press, Edinburgh. Paris: E. Plon et Cie, imprimeurs-éditeurs. 10, rue Garancière. LCCN 14-30268; OCLC 3732207 (all editions).
1. Via HathiTrust (Cal Berkeley). hdl:2027/uc1.31822011354644.
2. Via Google Books (UC Berkeley).
- Fromentin, Eugène (1877). Vingt-cinq dessins de Eugène Fromentin – reproduits à l'eau-forte par E.L. Montefiore [Twenty-Five Drawings by Eugène Fromentin – Etched Reproductions by E.L. Montefiore] (in-folio) (in French). Biographical and critical text by Philippe Burty (1830–1890) with facsimiles based on sketches by the master. Paris: Librairie de l'art. Printed by Alfred Cadart (1828–1875). Print made by Yves & Barret (photorelief prints illustrating letterpress). BnF 30179375w; OCLC 192841277 (all editions), OCLC 557590929 (all editions), 27205986, and OCLC 1149636614 (all editions) (1891 & 2012 re-prints).
- Charles Blanc (ed.). Gazette des beaux-arts [Fine Arts Gazette] (April–May–June 1859). "De l'art et de la curiosité" ["Of Art and Curiosity"] (in French). Vol. 2 (1^{re} année. Tome deuxième). Paris: Imprimerie de J. Claye, rue Saint-Benoît, 7 (Jules Alexandre Saturnin Claye; 1806–1886; Wikidata Q55677033). pp. 292–293. Retrieved October 15, 2024. LCCN 08-18272, LCCN 80-649794; ISSN 0016-5530, ISSN 2419-641X; OCLC 7119790 (all editions), OCLC 1570479 (all editions), 763454523, 763652579, 1448446215, and 1448446854.
1. See Gazette des Beaux-Arts
2. Via BnF (full document). April 1859. Gallica.
3. Via HathiTrust (full document). UC Boulder.
4. Via Google Books (UC Boulder).
5. Via Google Books (Indiana University).
- "La poste – Constantine (Algérie)" (in French). www.engival.fr.
- Speake, Jennifer, ed. (2003). Literature of Travels and Explorations (limited preview). Vol. 1: "A to F". New York: Fitzroy Dearborn, an imprint of Taylor & Francis. pp. 471–472. LCCN 2003-5352; ISBN 1-5795-8425-X; OCLC 1158856846 (all editions) (e-book).

=== General references: works by Eugène Fromentin in English translation ===
- "A Critic's Program" and "A Letter to a Young Artist" in Realism and Tradition in Art, 1848-1900: Sources and Documents, edited by Linda Nochlin, Englewood Cliffs, N.J.: Prentice-Hall, 1966, pp. 19–25; reprinted from the Mary Caroline Robbins translation of Gonse (1888).
- Between Sea and Sahara: An Algerian Journal, translation by Blake Robinson of Une Anée dans le Sahel (1859), Ohio University Press, 1999; reissued in 2004 by Tauris Parke Paperbacks with the subtitle An Orientalist Adventure.
- Dominique. Translated by Violet Isabelle Longman. London: Gerald Howe, Ltd. 1862 [1932]. OCLC 752985816 (all editions).
- Dominique. Translated by Sir Edward Howard Marsh. 1862 [1948]. ISBN 978-0-9481-6606-8. OCLC 14101794.. Reprint by Soho Book Company (1986).
- "The Isle of Ré: An Unpublished Fragment" in Eugène Fromentin, Painter and Writer by Louis Gonse, translated by Mary Caroline Robbins, Boston: James R. Osgood and Co., 1888, pp. 251–271; various other quotations, letters, and excerpts by Fromentin, translated by Robbins, appear throughout the book.
- The Masters of Past Time, or Criticism on the Old Flemish & Dutch Painters, uncredited translation of Les Maîtres d'autrefois (1876), New York: E.P. Dutton, 1913.
- The Old Masters of Belgium and Holland, translation by Mrs. Mary C. Robbins of Les Maîtres d'autrefois (1876), Boston: Houghton Mifflin Co., 1882.

=== General references: writings about Fromentin in English ===
- Bales, Richard. Persuasion in the French Personal Novel: Studies of Chateaubriand, Constant, Balzac, Nerval, and Fromentin, Birmingham, AL: Summa Publications, 1997.
- Beaume, Georges. Fromentin, translated from the French by Frederic Taber Cooper, New York: Stokes, 1913.
- Christin, Anne-Marie, and Berrong, Richard M. "Space and Convention in Eugène Fromentin: The Algerian Experience", New Literary History, vol. 15, no. 3, Spring, 1984, pp. 559-574.
- Evans, Arthur R., Jr.. The Literary Art of Eugène Fromentin: A Study in Style and Motif, Baltimore: The Johns Hopkins Press, 1966.
- "Eugene Fromentin", The Art Amateur, vol. 12, no. 1, Dec., 1884, p. 9.
- "Fromentin, Eugène", Benezit Dictionary of Artists, published online 31 October 2011.
- Gill, Hélène. "Eugene Fromentin and the Experience of the Desert: Self-quest in the Other's Territory," Chapter 3 in The Language of French Orientalist Painting, Lewiston, NY: Edwin Mellen Press, 2003.
- Gillet, Louis. "Eugène Fromentin" in The Catholic Encyclopedia, New York: Robert Appleton Company, 1909.
- Gonse, Louis. Eugène Fromentin, Painter and Writer, translated by Mary Caroline Robbins, Boston: James R. Osgood and Co., 1888.
- Harris, Frank. "Eugéne Fromentin: The Painter-Writer", Chapter XIV in Latest Contemporary Portraits, New York: The Macaulay Company, 1927.
- Hartman, Elwood. Three Nineteenth-Century French Writer/Artists and the Maghreb: The Literary and Artistic Depictions of North Africa by Théophile Gautier, Eugène Fromentin, and Pierre Loti, Tübingen: Gunter Narr Verlag, 1994.
- Kaplan, Judith. "Eugéne Fromentin (1820-1876)" in Orientalist Writers, edited by Coeli Fitzpatrick and Dwayne A. Tunstall, Detroit : Gale Cengage Learning, 2012.
- Magill, Frank N., editor. "Dominique by Eugéne Fromentin" in Masterplots: 2010 Plot Stories & Essay Reviews from the World's Fine Literature, Revised Edition, volume 3, Englewood Cliffs, N.J.: Salem Press, 1976.
- Mickel, Emanuel J. Eugène Fromentin, Twayne's World Authors Series 640, Boston: G.K. Hall & Co., 1981.
- Schapiro, Meyer. "Eugene Fromentin as Critic" in Theory and Philosophy of Art: Style, Artist and Society, Selected Papers, New York: George Braziller, 1994.
- Thompson, James P. W. "Fromentin, Eugène(-Samuel-Auguste)", Grove Art Online, published online 2003.
- Wright, Barbara. "Eugène Fromentin's 'Portrait de Jeune Femme' and the Possible Identification of Its Sources", The Burlington Magazine, vol. 116, no. 854, May, 1974, pp. 274–275.
- Wright, Barbara. "A drawing for 'Hodna': an early painting by Eugène Fromentin," The Burlington Magazine, vol. 155, no. 1322, May, 2013, pp. 324-325.
- Wright, Barbara. Eugène Fromentin: A Life in Art and Letters, Peter Lang, 2000.
- Wright, Barbara. "Eugène Fromentin (1820-76)" in Key Writers on Art, volume I, edited by Chris Murray, New York: Routledge, 2003.
