= MacRae (surname) =

MacRae is a surname. Notable people with this surname include:

- Alexander MacRae (c. 1888–1938), Australian entrepreneur and clothing manufacturer
- Alistair Macrae (b. 1957), Australian clergyman
- Allan MacRae (1902–1997), American theologian
- Andrew MacRae (soccer) (born 1990), Canadian soccer player
- Angus MacRae (b.1967) Moderator of the General Assembly of the Free Church of Scotland 2018
- Bill Macrae, British musician
- Calum MacRae (b. 1980), rugby union coach
- Callum Macrae, Scottish journalist and film maker
- Danny MacRae, Scottish shinty player
- Dave MacRae (b. 1940), New Zealand keyboardist
- Donald MacRae (1916–2006), Canadian astronomer
- Donnchadh MacRath, also known as Duncan MacRae of Inverinate, 17th-century poet
- Duncan Macrae (rugby union) (1914–2007) Scottish rugby union player
- Duncan MacRae (rugby league) (1934–2019), New Zealand rugby league player
- Duncan Macrae (actor) (1905–1967), Scottish actor and comedian
- Ebenezer James MacRae (1881–1951), Scottish architect
- Elizabeth MacRae (b. 1936), American actress
- Emma Fordyce MacRae (1887–1974), American painter
- Finlay MacRae (b. 1986), Scottish shinty player
- George W. MacRae, Florida Supreme Court Justice
- Gordon MacRae (1921–1986), American actor and singer
- Heather MacRae (b. 1946), American actress
- Helen MacRae (active 1909–1914), British suffragette
- Henry MacRae (1876–1944), Canadian film director, producer and screenwriter
- Jade MacRae, Australian soul singer
- James Macrae (1677–1744), Governor of Madras 1725–1730
- James Macrae (botanist) (died 1830), Botanist aboard the Voyage of the H.M.S. Blonde (1824–25)
- John Chester MacRae (1912–1997), Canadian teacher, soldier and politician
- John David MacRae (1876–1967), Canadian politician
- John MacRae-Gilstrap (1861–1937), British soldier who restored Eilean Donan Castle
- Josh Macrae, British drummer and record producer
- Keith MacRae (b. 1951), Scottish footballer
- Leah MacRae, Scottish actress
- Margaret Macrae, New Zealand swimmer
- Meredith MacRae (1944–2000), American actress
- Mike MacRae, American comedian and voice actor
- Neil MacRae (b. 1972) Scottish cricketer
- Norman Macrae (1923–2010), British economist and writer
- Renee MacRae (b. 1940), Scottish woman who disappeared in 1976
- Scott MacRae (b. 1974), American Major League Baseball player
- Sheila MacRae, English television actress
- Stuart Macrae (footballer) (1855–1927), English international footballer
- Stuart MacRae (composer) (b. 1976), Scottish composer
- Stuart Macrae (inventor), British inventor and Army officer
- Tom MacRae, British television writer
- William MacRae (1834–1882), officer in the Confederate States Army
- Willie McRae (1923–1985), Scottish nationalist best remembered for the mystery surrounding his death
- Peter Francis-Macrae (b. 1982), English spammer
