= Farquhar Macrae =

Scottish teacher and Christian preacher

Farquhar Macrae (1580-1662) was a Scottish minister in the parishes of Gairloch and Kintail, Ross and Cromarty (now part of the Highland Council). He is known for the cultural improvement he brought to the north of Scotland in the seventeenth century.

== Biography ==
Farquhar Macrae was the son of Christopher Macrae (d. 1615) and Isabella Murchison. He was born in 1580 in Eilean Donan Castle, where his father held the office of constable. He was sent to Perth for his education, and after five years there completed his education at the University of Edinburgh. Kenneth Mackenzie, Lord of Kintail, became acquainted with Macrae at Edinburgh and invited him to come north to help lift the spiritual and educational level of the inhabitants there. Macrae agreed to do so, though it meant he would have to turn down the offer to succeed his teacher, James Reid, as regent (professor). He began his career in the north as headmaster at Fortrose Grammar School, which was a respected school. While there, he was admitted to holy orders and soon acquired a reputation as a “sound, learned, eloquent, and grave preacher.”

When ironworks commenced at Letterewe in the parish of Gairloch, Englishmen were brought north to carry on the work there, and seeing that an English-speaking minister was needed to conduct services for them, Sir George Hay (later Earl of Kinnoull) invited Farquhar Macrae to become the vicar of Gairloch. A Gaelic-speaking pastor served the remaining parish, but Macrae also served the parish lying to the north of Loch Maree, then considered part of Lochbroom. During this time, he resided at Ardlair near which is a boulder called “the minister’s stone,” from which Rev. Macrae used to preach in English and Gaelic to those gathered around.

In 1610, after Mackenzie had acquired the Isle of Lewis, he took Macrae with him to help restore the spiritual climate of the island. Macrae baptized all islanders under forty since there had been no minister of the Gospel on Lewis for the preceding forty years. It is said so many required baptism that Macrae was obliged to use a heather besom to sprinkle water on crowds gathered around him rather than performing individual baptism. He also married many couples who had been cohabiting as man and wife under the Scots principle of marriage by cohabitation with habit and repute, thereby legitimizing their children, and he abolished the custom that had grown up there of men putting away their wives “upon the least discord.”

In 1616, Sir George Hay left Letterewe for Edinburgh and urged Rev. Macrae to leave Gairloch “and seek a wider field for his talents in the south,” offering him a pension and a choice of several parishes of which he (Hay) was patron; in addition, he sought an ecclesiastical promotion for Macrae. Macrae at first agreed to the proposal but was persuaded either by the young Colin Mackenzie, Lord of Kintail, or his own uncle, Roderick Macrae, “Tutor of Kintail,” that his services to the north were invaluable. It has been said that, had he accepted Sir George’s proposal, “his career in the Church would have been a very successful and distinguished one.” To entice Macrae to remain in the north, Mackenzie promised him the vicarage of Kintail when it was open; at the time, it was held by the Rev. Murdoch Murchison, Macrae’s elderly uncle. At Murchison’s passing in 1618, Macrae was made vicar of Kintail and, at the same time, was appointed constable of Eilean Donan Castle, which had long been in the keeping of the Clan Macrae. For reasons unknown, one member of the Clan Mackenzie effected the ouster of Macrae from the castle in 1650, though by this time the minister was aged and the cold climate of the castle was not particularly supportive of his health.

He removed to a place called Inchcruiter, remaining there for eleven years with the assistance of some of his grandchildren who resided with him after the passing of his wife. Macrae received there “all sorts of people, he being very generous, charitable, and free-hearted.”

== Royalist Sympathies ==
In 1654, during the English Civil War, General George Monck passed through Kintail with his army and commandeered 360 cows belonging to Rev. Macrae, who, like Monck, was a Royalist in his sympathies. After the Restoration, Macrae was advised to seek compensation for his loss from the government, but his loyalty to Charles II was such that he would not hear of it, considering “the successful restoration of the King sufficient compensation for any loss he might have suffered in the Royalist cause.” It is said that, by the time he died, Macrae had re-established his herd, which may even have surpassed its original size had it not been for the constant supply of meat needed for his many “grandchildren and their bairns.”

== Death and Burial ==
Macrae lived to see the restoration of Charles II, which happened in 1660. He died in 1662 and was buried in the Macrae burial ground at Clachan Duich (also called Kilduich), an ancient kirk in Kintail dedicated to St. Dubhthach.

== Family ==
Farquhar Macrae married Christina Macculloch of Park on 1 December 1611. They were the parents of the following:

- Alexander Macrae of Inverinate (b. 1612), whose son Duncan was later a celebrated Scottish Gaelic poet
- Donald Macrae, minister of Kintail (b. 1615)
- Miles Macrae (1616-1645), killed at the Battle of Auldearn
- Murdoch Macrae (1617-1700)
- John "Ian Breac" Macrae, (d. 1696)
- Christopher Macrae (b. 1619)
- Thomas Macrae (b. 1620)
- Isabel Macrae (b. 1621; m. 1st Malcolm Macrae; 2nd William Mackenzie)
- Helen Macrae (b. 1624; m. John Bayne of Knockbain)
- John Macrae, minister of Dingwall (b. 1614-1673)
