= Stuart Macrae =

Stuart Macrae or MacRae may refer to:

- Stuart Macrae (footballer) (1855–1927), English international footballer
- Stuart Macrae (inventor), British inventor
- Stuart MacRae (composer) (born 1976), British composer
