= John MacRae-Gilstrap =

British army officer (1861–1937)

Lieutenant Colonel John MacRae-Gilstrap (31 December 1861 – January 1937) was a British army officer and a senior figure of the Clan Macrae. He contested a rival claim to the chiefship of the clan, and in 1912 he purchased and subsequently restored the Macrae stronghold of Eilean Donan Castle on Loch Duich in the west of Scotland.

== Family ==
John MacRae was the second son of Duncan MacRae and Grace Stewart. He was born in the Punjab where his father had served as a surgeon with the East India Company during the Indian Rebellion of 1857. The family later returned to Scotland, where Duncan MacRae took up residence at Kames Castle in Bute, becoming Deputy Lieutenant of Buteshire; his older brother Stuart, though also born in India and Scottish by heritage, later played international football for England in the 1880s. His grandfather, Major Colin MacRae, also served in India with the 75th Highlanders. John's great-great-grandfather was John MacRae of Conchra, one of the "Four Johns of Scotland" who were killed fighting for the Jacobites at the Battle of Sheriffmuir in 1715.

== Military career ==
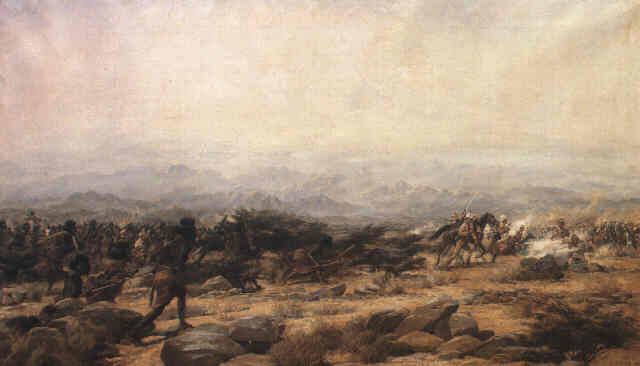
An incident at the Battle of Tamai, eastern Sudan, March 13, 1884 by Godfrey Douglas Giles

In 1883, MacRae joined the 1st battalion The Royal Highland Regiment (The Black Watch) as a lieutenant. The following year he was posted to Egypt where the regiment was engaged in the Mahdist War, and took part in the battle of Tamai (13 March 1884). In September he was placed in charge of a division of boats as part of the Nile Expedition under General Earle. The expedition was unsuccessful in its aim of relieving the Siege of Khartoum, and was attacked at Kirbekan in February 1885. MacRae was mentioned in despatches after the engagement, in which the Mahdists were defeated. He also received the Egypt Medal and a bronze Khedive's Star.

The British subsequently withdrew from Sudan, and MacRae was sent with his regiment to Malta, returning to Perth in 1889. The following year he was promoted to captain, and in 1901 he was appointed to the Royal Company of Archers, the sovereign's ceremonial bodyguard in Scotland.

== Marriage to the Gilstraps ==
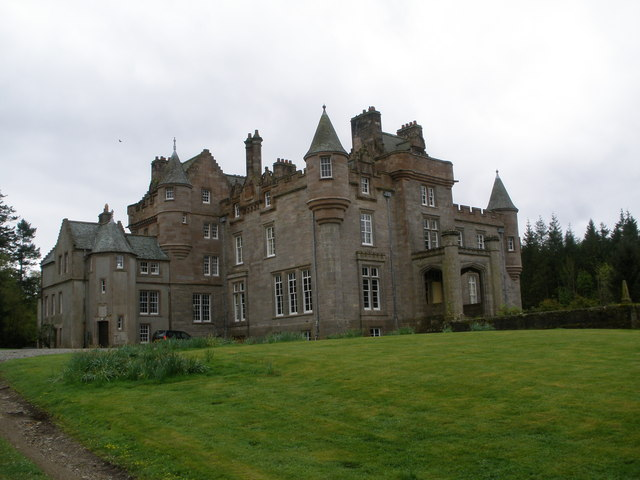
Ballimore House

On 4 March 1889, John MacRae married Isabella Mary Gilstrap, second daughter of the late George Gilstrap of Newark, at St Peter's, Eaton Square, London. Isabella was the niece and co-heiress of Sir William Gilstrap, Bt., a wealthy maltster and philanthropist. On Sir William's death in 1896, under the terms of his will, John MacRae took the additional surname of Gilstrap and assumed a senior role in the family firm of Gilstrap, Earp & Co., then the largest malt-producing business in Britain. In 1897, the MacRae-Gilstraps were living at 65 Northgate, Newark, and in 1899 they purchased Ballimore House at Otter Ferry, Taynuilt, Argyll.

== Chiefship of Clan Macrae ==
John MacRae-Gilstrap was a senior member of the MacRae family of Conchra, descended from Alexander MacRae who in 1677 received a wadset (mortgage) of the lands of Conchra on Loch Long, 2 kilometres (1.2 mi) north of Eilean Donan. The MacRaes of Conchra are one of several branches of the clan tracing their ancestry back to Fionnla Dubh mac Gillechriosd, the reputed progenitor of the Clan MacRae, the other principal families being MacRae of Inverinate, MacRae of Torlysich, and the Clann Ian Charrich, who claim descent from an even earlier ancestor.

Each of these principal families has claimed seniority over the others, and although the Rev. Alexander MacRae's History of the Clan MacRae, first published in 1899, places the Inverinate branch in the senior position, the matter continued to be debated. Regardless of seniority, no MacRae had ever been formally recognised as chief of the clan. The MacRaes were closely allied to the Clan Mackenzie, serving as the personal bodyguard to their chief, Mackenzie of Kintail (later the Earl of Seaforth), and acquiring the nickname "Mackenzie's Shirt of Mail".

In 1909, Sir Colin MacRae of Inverinate submitted a petition to Lord Lyon, the heraldic authority in Scotland, claiming the right to use a historical coat of arms as Chief of the Name of MacRae, and stating that his family had long been unofficially acknowledged as chiefs. John MacRae-Gilstrap had previously placed a "caveat" with the Lord Lyon, requesting that "should any application be presented in the Court of The Lord Lyon for matriculation of arms as Chief of The Clan MacRae", then he would be notified and offered the opportunity to speak.

The petition was duly heard at the Lyon Court, at which Macrae-Gilstrap was challenged as to his right to appear, since he was not the most senior representative of his own family. He responded that "I am here to protect myself and to say that I will not acknowledge the Inverinate branch in any shape or form as the Chief of the Clan MacRae and as my Chief." He continued by maintaining that "all the MacRae families are more or less on an equality", and argued that the MacRaes were a clan "which had no chief other than Seaforth". He also denied the seniority of the Inverinate family despite apparently conceding their seniority on a previous occasion, whereby he was accused by Sir Colin's counsel of picking and choosing his evidence.

In coming to a decision, announced in April 1909, the Lord Lyon, James Balfour Paul, confined himself to questions of heraldry. He found that Sir Colin had failed to prove his right to the use of chiefly arms, and did not therefore explore the question of the chiefship itself. Debates continued as to the merits of recognising a clan chief, with Sir Colin continuing to refer to himself as chief, and MacRae-Gilstrap continuing to reiterate his opposition to Sir Colin's claim.

== Restoration of Eilean Donan ==
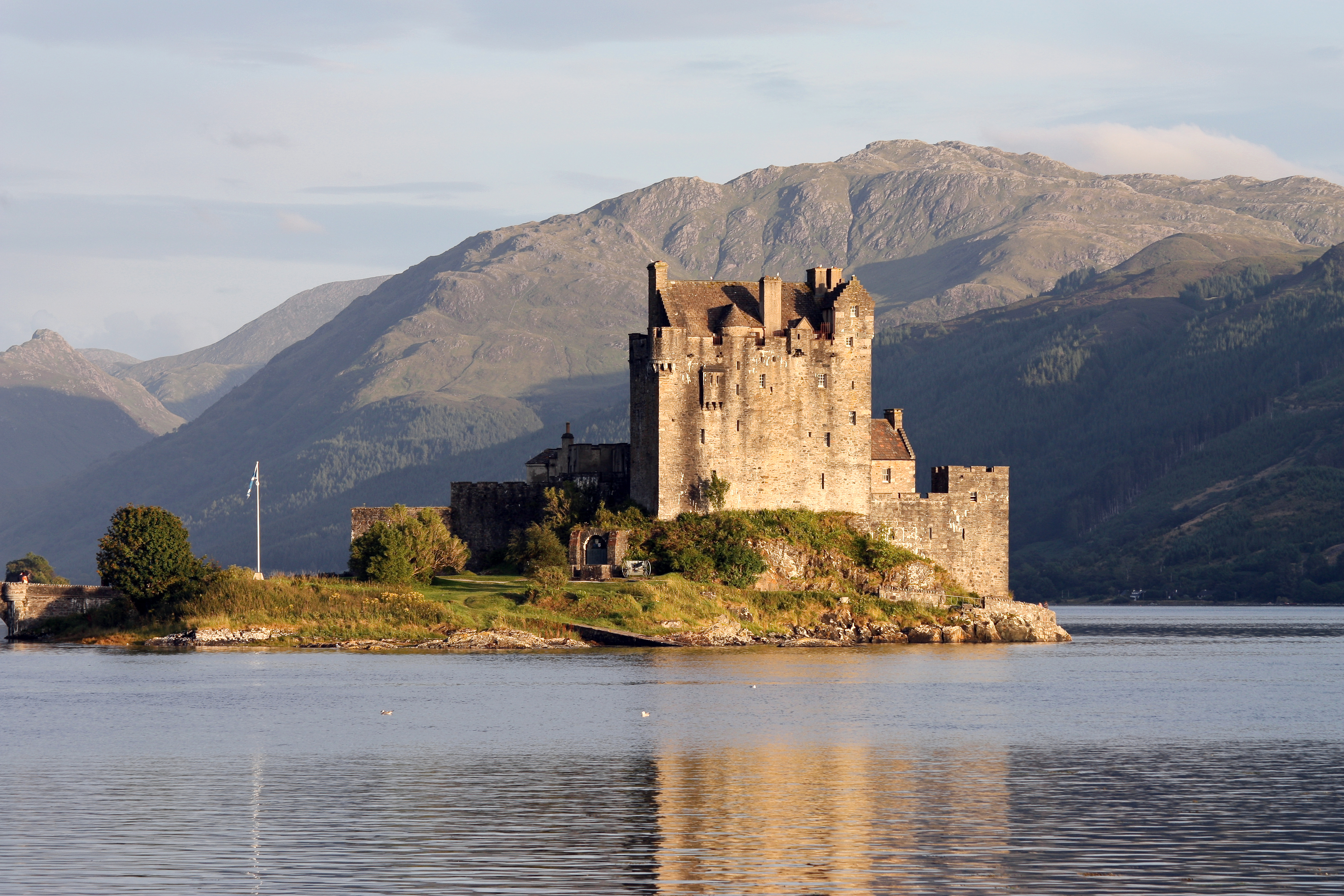
Eilean Donan Castle

Eilean Donan Castle, probably first built in the 13th century, was a stronghold of the Mackenzies of Kintail who appointed several generations of the Clan MacRae as constables. The last constable, Rev. Farquhar MacRae who was removed in 1651, was an ancestor of John MacRae-Gilstrap. During the failed Jacobite rising of 1719 the castle was occupied by Spanish troops and was demolished by government forces after the Spaniards surrendered. By 1912 the castle, located on an island in Loch Duich on the western coast of Lochalsh, had been reduced to a few fragments of masonry.

In 1912 MacRae-Gilstrap purchased Eilean Donan Castle from Sir Keith Fraser of Inverinate, becoming the first MacRae for many years to hold land in the traditional clan territory of Kintail. Initially MacRae-Gilstrap intended to preserve the ruins as they were and employed a local stonemason, Farquhar MacRae, to clear the site. He was engaged during the First World War, but returning to Kintail in 1919 he found Farquhar MacRae making preparations for a full restoration of the castle. Farquhar "claimed to have had a dream in which he saw, in the most vivid detail, exactly the way the castle originally looked". MacRae-Gilstrap agreed to go ahead with the reconstruction, and commissioned architect George Mackie Watson to prepare plans. The castle was fully rebuilt between the years 1920 and 1932. In the latter year the bridge to the mainland was completed, and a formal opening ceremony was held on 22 July 1932. The total cost of the restoration was around £250,000, largely funded by the Gilstrap inheritance.

== Death and descendants ==
John MacRae-Gilstrap died in January 1937 at Eilean Donan, and was buried at the historic MacRae cemetery at Clachan Duich, at the head of Loch Duich. Isabella lived on until 1949. John and Isabella had five daughters and one son. His estates passed to his son, Captain Duncan MacRae (1890–1966), and then to his son, John MacRae (1925–1988). John MacRae opened Eilean Donan to the public in 1955, and established the Conchra Charitable Trust in 1983 to care for the castle. His daughter Baroness Miranda van Lynden, great-granddaughter of John MacRae-Gilstrap, is the present head of the MacRaes of Conchra.
