= Alexander Mackenzie of Kintail =

Scottish clan chief (before 1427–after 1471)

Alexander Mackenzie (before 1436 - after 1471), known as "Ionraic" (or "the Upright"), traditionally counted as 6th of Kintail, was the first chief of the Clan Mackenzie of whom indisputable contemporary documentary evidence survives. During his long life, he greatly expanded his clan's territories and influence.

== Sources ==
There is little authority for the existence and life of Alexander which pre-dates the (frequently unreliable) clan histories written in the 17th century. MS 1467, a 15th-century genealogy, demonstrates that the Mackenzies were by then already recognised as a family of long standing, but does not refer to Alexander himself.

The historicity of Alexander was for a long time based on two alleged charters in his favour dated 1463 and 1477. J.R.N. Macphail KC cast doubt on these:

According to Mr. P. J. Anderson (Scots Peerage, vol. vii. p. 497) he had a charter of Killin and other lands from the Earl of Ross in 1463, and a crown charter in 1477 of Strathconan and other lands forfeited by the Earl. But the authority cited is only an Inventory of the Allangrange Papers. He does not appear in the Register of the Great Seal or other public records.

However, the inventory recording the charter of 1463 (a list of the charters in the possession of Colin Mackenzie, 1st Earl of Seaforth) has been in existence since about 1627 and its authenticity is implicitly accepted by Aonghas MacCoinnich. In any event, although the existence and terms of these two charters may be doubtful, it is established that "Alexander McKennye de Kintail" did witness a charter executed by John of Islay, Earl of Ross at Dingwall in 1471.

He also appears in a papal marriage dispensation dated 13 September 1465, which was granted to his son, who was styled as "Kenneth, son of Alexander, family of Kenneth". In the following year, Alexander himself sought dispensation in terms which recorded that he had been married to "Catherine, daughter of John, son of Ranald" for about thirty years and that they had offspring.

== Early life ==
According to the traditional clan genealogy, Mackenzie was the son of Murdoch Mackenzie (5th of Kintail) and Finguala, daughter of Malcolm Macleod of Harris.

He was allegedly among the Western barons summoned to Inverness in 1427 to meet King James, who promptly seized them on arrival, executing some and imprisoning others. The king sent Mackenzie, then a mere youth, to the High School at Perth, regarded at that time as the principal literary seminary in Scotland. According to traditional histories of the Clan Macrae, he was prevailed upon by Fionnla Dubh mac Gillechriosd to return from school in order to deal with three illegitimate uncles, who were disturbing his tenants in Kinlochewe.

== Downfall of the Lord of the Isles ==
In the long-running conflict between the Lord of the Isles and the Scottish crown, Mackenzie chose the side of the latter. The course of events, as they affected Mackenzie, is allegedly summarised in the two charters in his favour which are referred to above. On 7 January 1463, Mackenzie received a charter from John of Islay, Earl of Ross, confirming him in his lands of Kintail, with a further grant of the "5 merk lands of Killin, the lands of Garve, and the 2 merk lands of Coryvulzie, with the three merk lands of Kinlochluichart, and 2 merk lands of Ach-na-Clerich [Achnaclerach], the 2 merk lands of Garbat, the merk lands of Delintan, and the 4 merk lands of Tarvie, all lying within the shire and Earldom of Ross, to be holden of the said John and his successors, Earls of Ross."

However, in 1462, John of Islay had over-reached himself by entering into a treacherous agreement with Edward IV of England and Mackenzie later played a significant part in the negotiations between John of Islay and James III that led to the former's surrender of the Earldom of Ross in 1476. Mackenzie was rewarded in 1477 with a charter from the Crown to some of the lands renounced by the Earl of Ross, namely Strathconan, Strathbraan, and Strathgarve, and was confirmed in his lands in Kintail. It was probably at this point that Mackenzie moved his family's chief residence from Eilean Donan in Kintail to Kinellan Castle, near Strathpeffer. After this the Barons of Kintail held all their lands quite independently of any superior but the Crown.

At some point between 1485 and 1491, Mackenzie's son Kenneth led the Mackenzies to victory over Alexander Macdonald of Lochalsh at the Battle of Blar-na-Pairc. This battle may be regarded as a seal upon the rise of the Mackenzies at the expense of their former Macdonald overlords.

== Earldom of Ross ==
The Earl of Sutherland had been on friendly terms with Mackenzie, and appointed him as his deputy in the management of the Earldom of Ross, which devolved on him after the forfeiture. On one occasion, the Earl of Sutherland being in the south at Court, the Strathnaver men and the men of the Braes of Caithness took advantage of his absence and invaded Sutherland. It is said that an account of their conduct soon spread abroad, and reached the ears of the Chief of Kintail, who at once with a party of six hundred men, passed into Sutherland, where, the Earl's followers having joined him, he defeated the invaders, killed a large number of them, forced the remainder to sue for peace, and compelled them to give substantial security for their peaceful behaviour in future.

The Earl of Cromartie said:

“…as his prudent management in the Earldom of Ross showed him to be a man of good natural parts, so it very much contributed to the advancement of the interest of his family by the acquisition of the lands he thereby made; nor was he less commendable for the quiet and peace he kept among his Highlanders, putting the laws punctually in execution against all delinquents."

== Other clan disputes ==
Mackenzie also involved himself in the affairs of his neighbours. According to the Earl of Cromartie, he intervened to assist Allan Macdonald of Moidart (with whom he had previously been at loggerheads) against Allan's brother, who had usurped some of the Moydart estates, and there are also traditional accounts of his involvement in about 1452 in the Battle of Bealach nam Broig between a western force of MacIvers, Maclennans, Macaulays and Macleays against a force of Frasers, Munroes of Foulis and Dingwalls of Kildun.

== Family, death and posterity ==
Alexander was the first of the family who lived on the island in Loch Kinellan, near Strathpeffer, while at the same time he had Brahan as a mains or farm, both of which his successors for a time held from the King at a yearly rent, until they were later feued.

Alexander's marriages have been the subject of genealogical controversy. The weight of traditional clan history is to the effect that he married, first, Anna, daughter of John Macdougall of Dunollie, and, secondly, Margaret, daughter of Macdonald of Morar (a cadet of Macdonald of Clanranald), but Aonghas MacCoinnich has pointed out the difficulties which Alexander's supplication for dispensation in 1466 (referred to above) presents for the traditional account. MacCoinnich speculates that Catherine, who was recorded in the supplication as Alexander's wife, may have been the granddaughter of Ranald, the eponym of Clanranald.

By his first wife, Alexander had Kenneth, his heir and successor, and Duncan, progenitor of the Mackenzies of Hilton. By his second wife (if he had one), he had Hector Roy (or "Eachainn Ruadh"), from whom are descended the Mackenzies of Gairloch, and a daughter who married Allan Macleod, Hector Roy's predecessor in Gairloch.

He is also said to have had a natural son (or, in some sources, a brother), Dugal, who became a priest and was Superior of Beauly Priory, which he repaired about 1478, and in which he is buried.

The date of Alexander's death is uncertain, though it is clear that he had died by 1488, since his eldest son was served heir in the lands of Kintail at Dingwall on 2 September 1488. Aonghas MacCoinnich suggests that Alexander may in fact have died by July 1479, as his son was by then already being held responsible for rental payments in the king's dukedom of Ross.

== Line of Chiefs ==
Preceded by Murdoch Mackenzie	Chief of Clan Mackenzie ?–1488	Succeeded by Kenneth Mackenzie
