= Stuart Macrae (footballer) =

English footballer

Personal information
- Date of birth: 7 December 1855
- Place of birth: Bengal, British India
- Date of death: 27 January 1927 (aged 71)
- Position: Half back

Senior career*
| Years | Team | Apps | (Gls) |
- Notts County
- Newark Town
- Corinthian

International career
| 1883–1884 | England | 5 | (0) |
- * Club domestic league appearances and goals

Stuart Macrae (7 December 1855 – 27 January 1927) was an English international footballer, who played as a half back.

== Career ==
Macrae played for Notts County, and Newark Town and ended his career at Corinthian. At national level, despite his Scottish heritage (the son of a clan chieftain whose work as an army surgeon had caused him to relocate to India), as an overseas-born subject of the British Empire he was only eligible for England under the rules at the time, besides which he was already living in Nottinghamshire having moved south to work at a brewing firm. He earned five caps between 1883 and 1884.

His younger brother was John MacRae-Gilstrap, credited with restoring the Eilean Donan Castle.

== Later life ==
Macrae partook in many areas of amateur sport and was the first president and captain of Newark Golf Club until his death in 1927.

== See also ==
- List of England international footballers born outside England
