= Inverinate =

Coordinates: 57.24574°N 5.46036°W

Inverinate: Scottish Gaelic: Inbhir Ìonaid
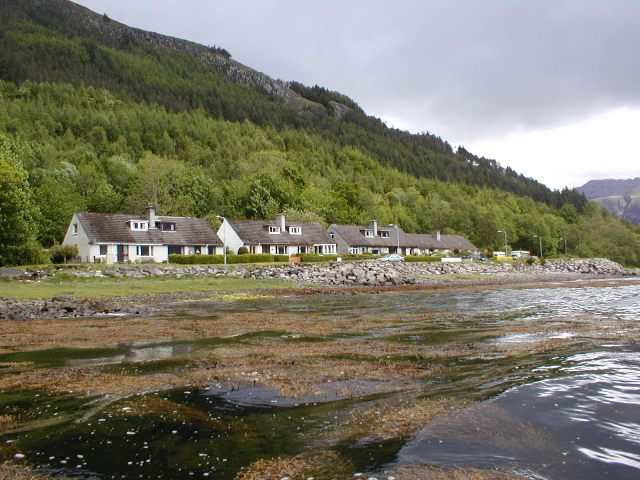
- Inverinate

- Location within the Ross and Cromarty area
- OS grid reference: NG913225
- Council area: Highland
- Country: Scotland
- Sovereign state: United Kingdom
- Postcode district: IV40 8
- Police: Scotland
- Fire: Scottish
- Ambulance: Scottish

Inverinate (Scottish Gaelic: Inbhir Ìonaid) is a small linear village on the north shore of Loch Duich in Lochalsh, Scottish Highlands and is in the Scottish council area of Highland. It is formed along the A87, about 10 miles south of Kyle of Lochalsh.

== History ==
A prominent family of tacksmen of Clan Macrae were based for several centuries at Inverinate. They were loyal followers of the Earls of Seaforth and included Chamberlains of Kintail, castellans of Eilean Donan, clergymen and poets (such as Donnchadh MacRath) and Iain mac Mhurchaidh.

The community is within the former Kintail parish, which also encompassed the village of Dornie.

Inverinate House is a large Tudoresque mansion, which was built on the north shore of Loch Duich around 1850 for Sir Alexander Matheson (1805 - 1886). It was rebuilt following a fire in 1864.

The Killilan and Inverinate estate has been owned by Sheikh Mohammed bin Rashid Al Maktoum, the ruler of Dubai for over 20 years. The 63,000 acres (25,000 ha) includes several large lodges, three helipads and a pool. In 2025, plans were approved for a tenth house - a fifteen bedroom mansion - to be built on the estate. There has been concerns by the Highland Council about the wear and tear on the local roads with such large numbers of people visiting the community.

== Facilities ==
Despite its small size, the community has a number of facilities. These include Loch Duich Primary School - which serves the primary school children who live around Loch Duich, including Inverinate, Morvich, Kintail and Ratagan. Inverinate also hosts a petrol station - with access to petrol 24 hours a day; a Church of Scotland and a community centre. Within the community centre, both the South West Ross Church of Scotland and Glenelg & Inverinate Free Church of Scotland congregations meet weekly (the Church of Scotland, due to their church building needing remedial works).
