= Fionnla Dubh mac Gillechriosd =

- Known for: traditional ancestor of Clan Macrae
- Children: Christopher (son); John (son)

Notes
- Fionnla Dubh and his sons are known from late 17th century tradition

Fionnla Dubh mac Gillechriosd is purported to have been a 15th-century Scotsman, who lived in the north-west of Scotland. The Gaelic Fionnla Dubh mac Gillechriosd translates into English as "Fionnla the black, son of Gillechriosd". Fionnla Dubh is known from a late 17th-century traditional account of Clan Macrae; within that account he presented as a prominent ancestor of the clan. The tradition relates that for a time the chief of Clan Mackenzie was absent, and during that time his bastard uncles were causing trouble in the Mackenzies' territories of Kintail and Kinlochewe. Fionnla Dubh was then ordered to retrieve the chief and was successful in his task. From that time onward, says the tradition, the Macraes from the Kintail area rose in prominence amongst their Mackenzie lords. Tradition also states that Fionnla Dubh is an ancestor of the leading lines of the Macraes from Kintail.

== Sources ==
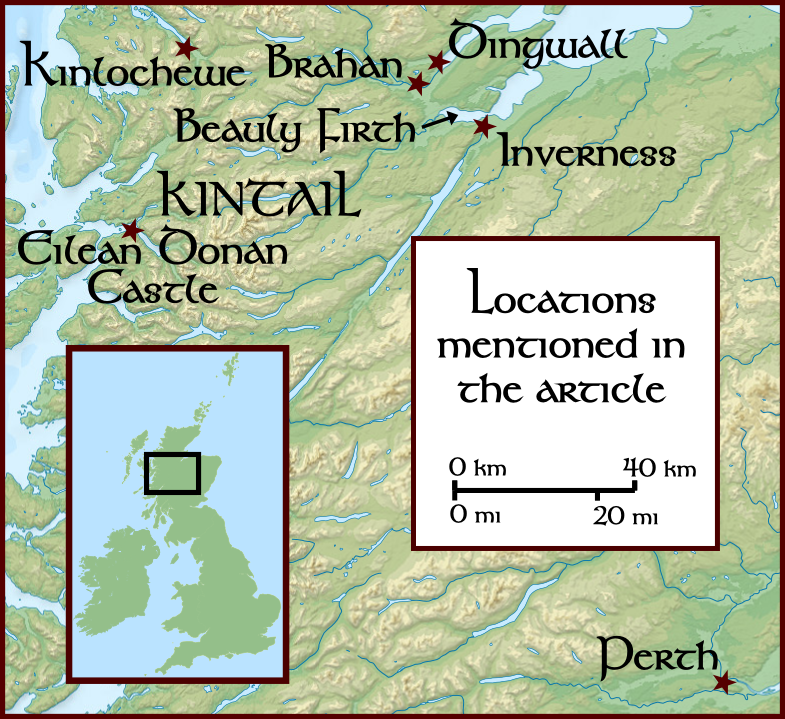
Locations mentioned within article

According to the late 19th-century historian Alexander Mackenzie, and Rev. Alexander Macrae in the early 20th century, the main authority for the early history of Clan Macrae is the late 17th-century manuscript account of the clan written by Rev. John Macrae. This John Macrae was the last Episcopalian minister of Dingwall; he died in 1704. Alexander Macrae stated that at the time of his writing, the original copy of the manuscript was by then lost; however, he noted that there were several differing copies of it still in existence which contained certain additions over the years. Alexander Macrae largely based his history of the clan upon John Macrae's earlier account.

== Background ==
According to tradition, the Macraes were originally from Ireland, and shared a common ancestry with the Mackenzies and Macleans. The Macraes were said to have originated from Clunes, which is located near the southern shore of the Beauly Firth, and was within the lordship of Lovat. Alexander Macrae stated that these traditions likely refer to a period sometime in the middle of the 13th century. According to John Macrae, after a violent dispute arose between the Macraes and more powerful Frasers of Lovat, three sons of the Macrae chief set off for new lands. One of the sons settled in Brahan, near Dingwall (later the site of Brahan Castle); another settled in Argyll; and the other settled in Kintail.

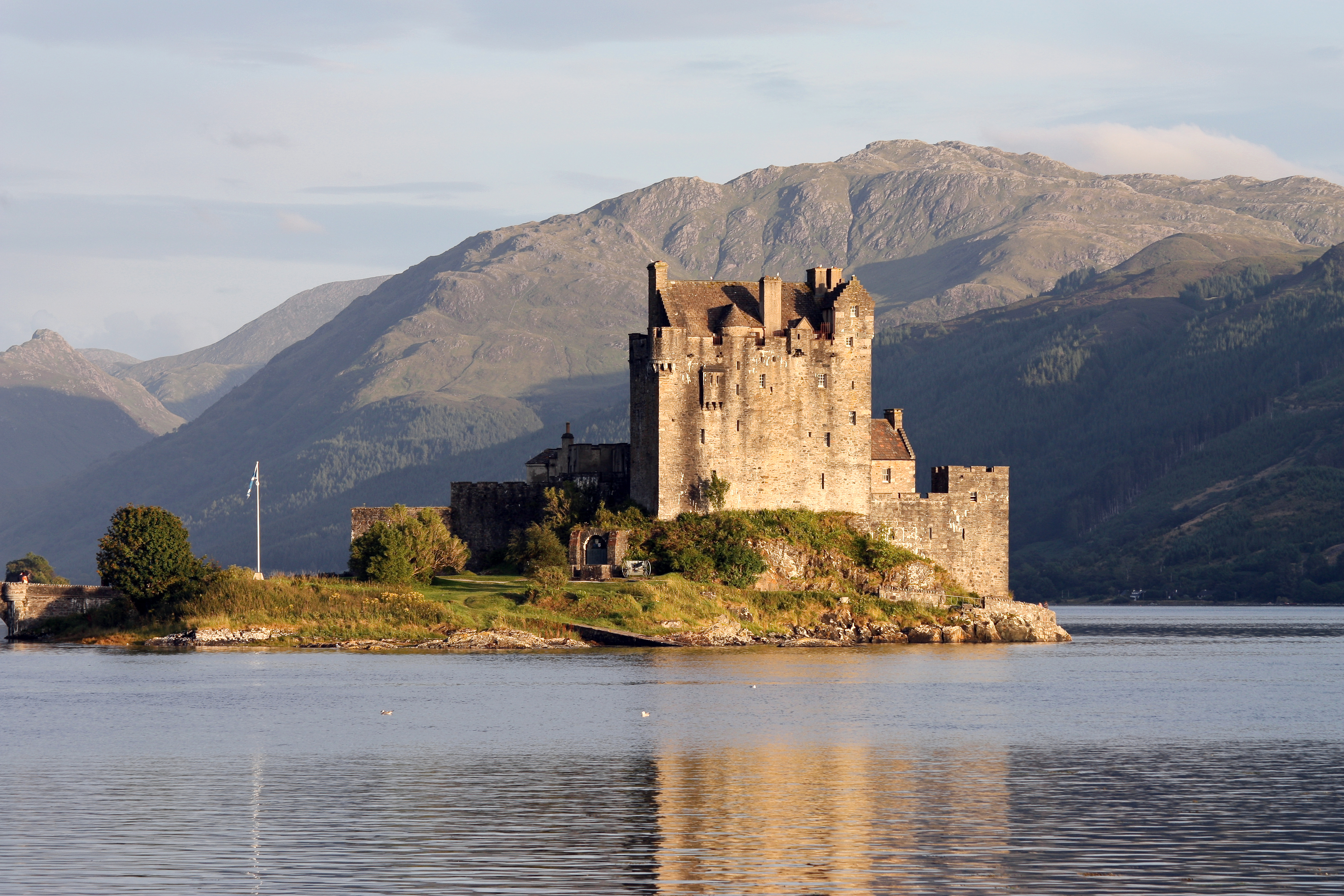
Eilean Donan Castle, in 2009

At that time Kintail was held by the Mackenzies, and according to John Macrae's account, there were very few Mackenzies of the chiefly line and thus the chief of that clan welcomed the Macraes because they shared a common descent and could be relied upon. Although John Macrae did not know the name of the Macrae brother who settled in Kintail, he stated that this Macrae brother married the daughter, or granddaughter, of Macbeolan who possessed a large part of Kintail before the Mackenzie's rise to power. (Note: Forms of the name Macbeolan, or O'beolan, were applied to describe the early earls of Ross; however, according to historian Alexander Grant, the Gaelic name Beólan, meaning "little mouth", was fairly common and may have been used as a nickname. Grant stated that the Macbeolan referred to in Macrae tradition does not necessarily refer to the Earls of Ross.) Alexander Mackenzie considered this marriage to be the real reason for the loyalty given by the Macraes to their Mackenzie lords; he did not believe the Macraes and Mackenzies shared a common ancestry in the male line as John Macrae had claimed.

Alexander Macrae was of the opinion that these events probably took place sometime in the first half of the 14th century, before the Mackenzies became firmly established in the Kintail area. He stated that there didn't appear to be any evidence that the Macraes were in the Kintail area before the time of these events, but noted that it was said that Eilean Donan Castle was garrisoned by Macraes and Maclennans in the late 13th century, during the period when the fortress was first taken into possession by Kenneth, founder of the Mackenzies of Kintail. The Macraes are known to have been constant supporters of the Mackenzies in recorded times; in 1520, and for many years onwards, they were constables of Eilean Donan Castle. In view of their constant service to the Mackenzies, the Macraes of Kintail became known as the Mackenzies' "shirt of mail".

== Fionnla Dubh ==
The Gaelic name Fionnla Dubh mac Gillechriosd means "Fionnla the black, son of Gillechriosd". A modern Scottish Gaelic spelling of the name is Fionnlagh Dubh mac GilleChrìosd. There are numerous ways the name can be Anglicised, or rendered into English; one such way is "Finlay the black, son of Christopher". (Note: Alexander Grant noted that the Gaelic name Gille Críosd, meaning "servant of Christ", is the same as the name Cristin, which was the name of several of the descendants of Gilleoin of the Aird, who is regarded as the progenitor of the Mackenzies (and several other notable clans). The name was also common among the Macraes.)

According to John Macrae, Fionnla Dubh mac Gillechriosd was about two, or three, generations removed from the Macrae who settled in Kintail from Clunes. Alexander Macrae stated that Fionnla Dubh was a contemporary of Murdo Mackenzie, fifth chief of the Mackenzies of Kintail. In 1416, Murdo died and was succeeded by his son, Alexander. Because Alexander was still a minor, he was sent to school in Perth, and in his absence, Eilean Donan Castle has held by its constable who was a Macaulay.

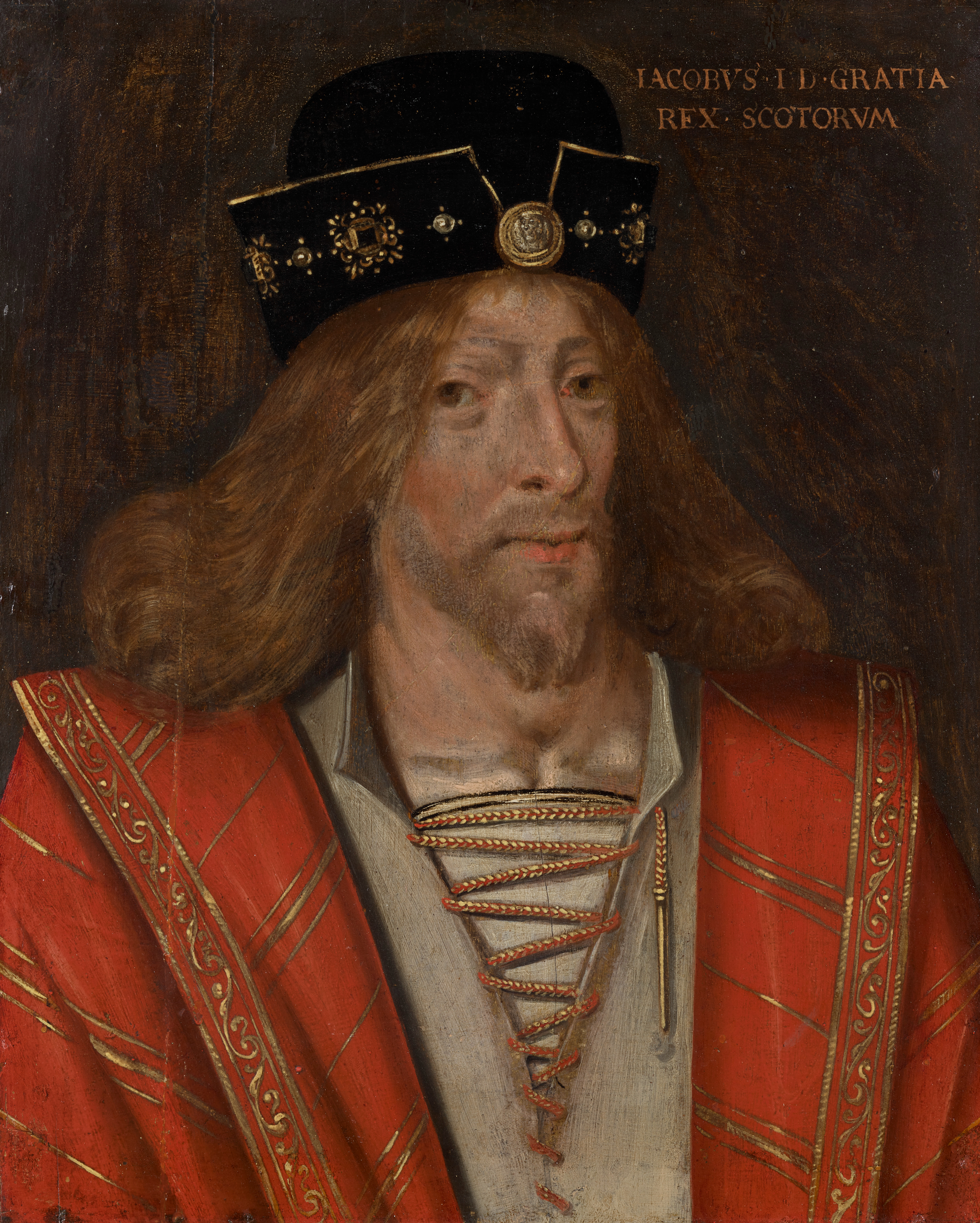
James I, King of Scots

Historically in 1427, James I visited Inverness with the intention of establishing law and order within the chaotic northern realm. The most powerful Highland chiefs were summoned to parliament, and when they reached Inverness Castle they were apprehended and imprisoned; several of the mightiest were condemned to death and executed, others were eventually released. According to historian Alexander Mackenzie, the young Mackenzie chief, Alexander of Kintail, was one of those so-released, and was sent by the king to school far south in Perth (then known as Saint Johnstoun), which was at that time the location of the principal literary seminary in the kingdom, and was frequently the seat of court.

According to the traditions related by John Macrae, with the absence of the young chief, troubles arose in Kintail and Kinlochewe through the misconduct of some of the young chief's relatives—three bastard uncles. Unwilling to leave his post at Eilean Donan Castle, Macaulay was anxious for the return of the Mackenzie chief, and so ordered Fionnla Dubh to go to Perth to bring him home. Fionnla Dubh successfully found and retrieved the chief, and as they made their way back to Kintail they detoured from a direct journey home and stayed with Macdougal of Lorn to avoid being pursued. When the young chief arrived in Kintail, the oppressing uncles were brought under subjection, and order was re-established in the area.

John Macrae, and Alexander Macrae (who based his clan history on John Macrae's account), followed the descent of the main line of the Macraes from Fionnla Dubh's eldest son Christopher. Alexander Macrae noted that little was known about Christopher himself. Alexander Macrae stated that Fionnla Dubh's younger son, John, was educated at Beauly Priory, and in time became the priest of Kintail in Sutherland; he married and had a daughter named Margaret.
