= Eilean Donan =

Small tidal island in the western Highlands of Scotland

Eilean Donnain (Gaelic)
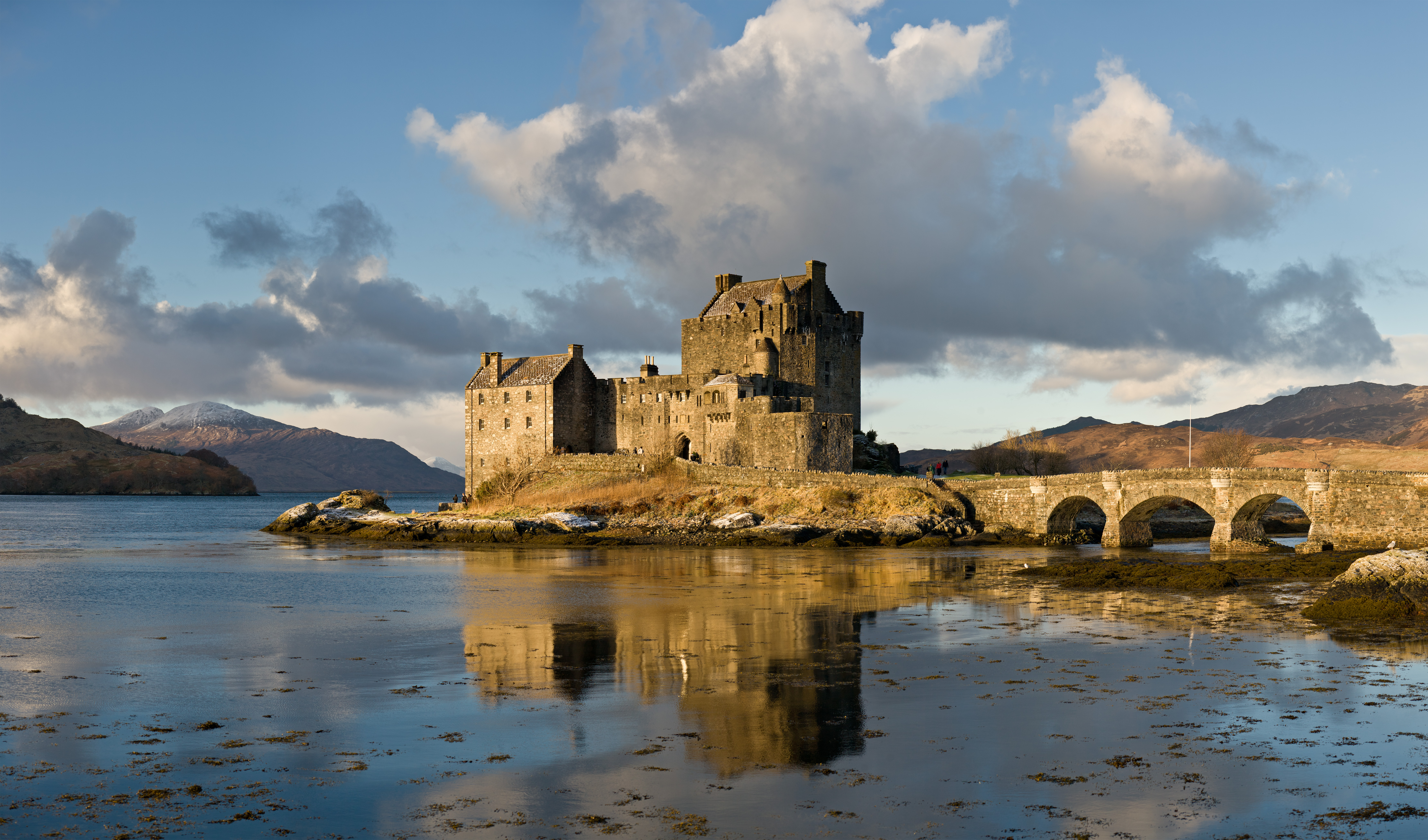
- Eilean Donan Castle

Location
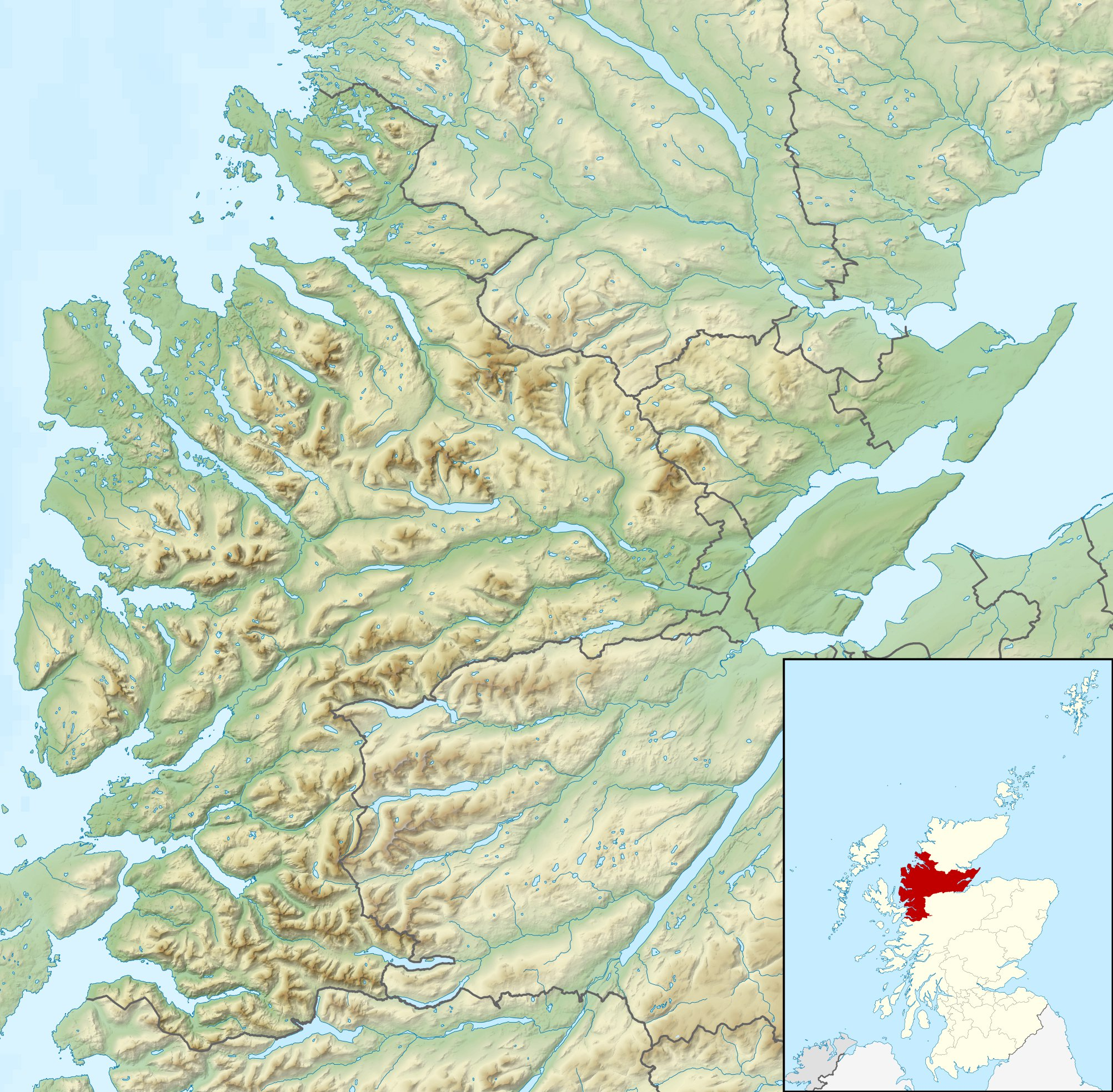
- Eilean Donan shown within Ross and Cromarty
- OS grid reference: NG880260
- Coordinates: 57°16′26.50″N 05°30′58″W

Name
- Name meaning: Island of Donnán

Physical geography
- Island group: Loch Duich
- Highest elevation: 3 m (10 ft)

Administration
- Council area: Highland
- Country: Scotland
- Sovereign state: United Kingdom

Demographics
- Population: 0

Eilean Donan (Scottish Gaelic: Eilean Donnain) is a small tidal island situated at the confluence of three sea lochs (Loch Duich, Loch Long and Loch Alsh) in the western Highlands of Scotland, about one kilometre (5/8 mi) from the village of Dornie. It is connected to the mainland by a footbridge that was installed early in the 20th century and is dominated by a picturesque castle that frequently appears in photographs, film and television. The island's original castle was built in the thirteenth century; it became a stronghold of the Clan Mackenzie and their allies, the Clan MacRae. In response to the Mackenzies' involvement in the Jacobite rebellions against the newly United Kingdom, Royal Naval ships destroyed the castle in 1719. The present-day castle is Lieutenant-Colonel John Macrae-Gilstrap's 20th-century reconstruction of the old castle.

Eilean Donan is part of the Kintail National Scenic Area, one of 40 in Scotland. In 2001, the island had a recorded population of just one person, but there were no "usual residents" at the time of the 2011 census.

Eilean Donan, which means simply "island of Donnán", is named after Donnán of Eigg, a Celtic saint who was martyred in 617. Donnán is said to have established a church on the island, though no trace of this remains.

== History ==
It is possible that an early Christian monastic cell was founded on the island in the 6th or 7th century, and that it was dedicated to Donnán of Eigg, an Irish saint who was martyred on Eigg in April 617. No remains of any Christian buildings survive, though fragments of vitrified stone (stone that has been subjected to very high temperatures) have been discovered, indicating that there was an Iron Age or early medieval fortification on the island.

=== Origins of the castle ===
In the earlier thirteenth century, during the reign of Alexander II (ruled 1214–1249), a large curtain-wall castle (wall of enceinte) was constructed; it enclosed much of the island. At this time, the area around the island was at the boundary of the Norse-Celtic Lordship of the Isles and the Earldom of Ross: Eilean Donan provided a strong defensive position against Norse expeditions. A founding legend has it that the son of a chief of the Mathesons acquired the power to communicate with birds; as a result of this power, and after many adventures overseas, he gained wealth, power, and the respect of Alexander II, who asked him to build the castle to defend his realm.

At a later date, the island became a stronghold of the Mackenzies of Kintail, originally vassals of William I, Earl of Ross. At this early stage, the castle is said to have been garrisoned by Macraes and Maclennans, both clans that were later closely associated with the Mackenzies. Traditional Mackenzie clan histories relate that Earl William sought advantage from the Treaty of Perth of 1266, by which King Magnus VI of Norway ceded the Hebrides to Scotland, and demanded that his kinsman Kenneth Mackenzie return the castle to allow his expansion into the islands. Mackenzie refused, and Earl William led an assault against Eilean Donan that the Mackenzies and their allies repulsed.

The Mackenzie clan histories also claim (with little, if any, supporting contemporary evidence), that Robert the Bruce sheltered at Eilean Donan during the winter of 1306 to 1307; the castle escaped any other involvement in the Wars of Scottish Independence. In 1331 Thomas Randolph, Earl of Moray, sent an officer to Eilean Donan to warn the occupants of his forthcoming visit. In preparation 50 wrongdoers were rounded up and executed, their heads being displayed on the castle walls to Moray's approval. By the middle of the 14th century, the Mackenzies are said to have been on the losing side in the ongoing feuding with the Earls of Ross. William III, Earl of Ross granted Kintail to Raghnall Mac Ruaidhrí in 1342. With the assistance of Leod Macgilleandrais, the Earl allegedly apprehended Kenneth Mackenzie, 3rd of Kintail, and had him executed in 1346 at Inverness. Through this period Eilean Donan is said to have been held by Duncan Macaulay for the Mackenzies, against the Earl and his allies. Kenneth's young son Murdo Mackenzie supposedly evaded the Earl's attempts to eliminate him, and on the return of David II from exile Murdo Mackenzie was allegedly confirmed in the lands of Kintail and Eilean Donan by a charter of 1362 (of which, however, no trace survives to the present day). At some point in the earlier 14th century it is thought that the Clan Macrae began to settle in Kintail as a body, having migrated from the Beauly Firth, and there gained the trust of the Mackenzie lairds through possible kinship and an advantageous marriage. The Macraes began to act as Mackenzie's bodyguards, acquiring the soubriquet "Mackenzie's shirt of mail".

=== Clan feuding ===
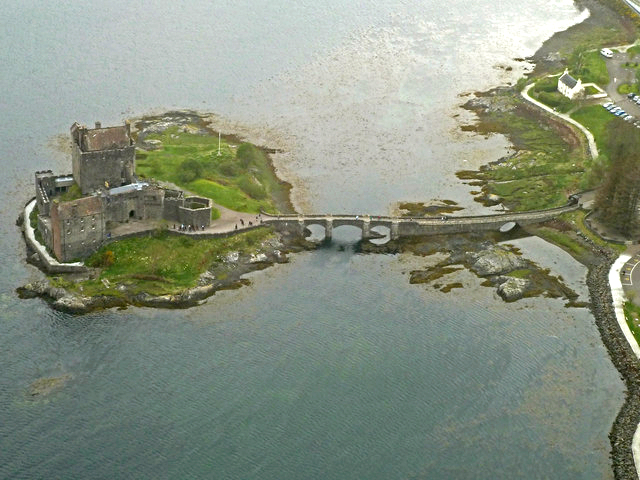
Aerial view of Eilean Donan

James I, determined to pacify the Highlands, journeyed to Inverness in 1427 and invited the principal chiefs to meet him there. Allegedly among them was the young Alexander Mackenzie, 6th Earl of Kintail. James then arrested him, along with the other chiefs, on their arrival. Mackenzie clan histories relate that, although several chiefs were executed or imprisoned, Alexander, due to his youth, was instead sent to Perth to attend school. Alexander's uncles attempted to seize control of Kintail, but the constable Duncan Macaulay continued to hold Eilean Donan on his behalf. Fionnla Dubh mac Gillechriosd, considered by clan historians to be the founder of the Clan Macrae in Kintail, was dispatched to fetch the young laird back. During his lairdship Alexander appears to have supported the monarchy against the MacDonald Lords of the Isles and was allegedly rewarded by another charter of Kintail in 1463. Alexander died in about 1488 at a great age, and was succeeded by Kenneth Mackenzie, 7th of Kintail who won the Battle of Blar Na Pairce against the MacDonalds. Kenneth died a few years later and was succeeded first by his eldest son, then on his death in 1497 by his second son, John of Killin, who was still a minor. His uncle, Hector Roy Mackenzie, attempted to usurp the Mackenzie lands and installed his own constable in Eilean Donan, Malcolm Mac Ian Charrich Macrae. Hector's lawless activities caused the Mackenzies to be branded rebels, and in 1503 the Earl of Huntly offered to deliver Eilean Donan to the king, and to hold it on his behalf. James IV supplied a ship to support the enterprise. Eventually, John compelled his uncle to relinquish his claim, and Hector agreed to hand over Eilean Donan. The constable refused however, and John's supporters laid siege. Malcolm Mac Ian Charrich was eventually persuaded by Hector to relinquish the castle, after which he was dismissed as constable and Christopher Macrae (Gillechriosd Mac Fionnlagh Mhic Rath) was appointed in his place in around 1511. John of Killin obtained a further charter of Kintail and Eilean Donan in 1509.

In 1539, Donald Gorm Macdonald of Sleat ravaged the lands of MacLeod of Dunvegan on Skye and then attacked the Mackenzie lands of Kinlochewe, where Miles (Maolmure), brother of Christopher Macrae, was killed. After a series of retaliatory raids, Donald Gorm learned that Eilean Donan was weakly garrisoned and launched a surprise attack. In fact, only two people were in the castle: the recently appointed constable Iain Dubh Matheson and the warden. Duncan MacGillechriosd of the Clan Macrae, son of the former constable, arrived at the start of the attack and killed several MacDonalds at the postern gate. Arrows launched by the attackers killed Matheson and the warden, but MacGillechriosd managed to hit Donald Gorm with his last arrow, fatally wounding Gorm, and the Macdonalds retreated. Duncan MacGillechriosd expected to be appointed as the new constable but was considered too headstrong: the local clergyman John MacMhurchaidh Dhuibh (John Murchison) was appointed as a compromise between rival Macrae and Maclennan interests. Furious at this treatment, MacGillechriosd left Kintail and joined the service of Lord Lovat, though he eventually returned to settle at Inverinate. Meanwhile, an aggrieved Maclennan apparently shot MacMhurchaidh in the buttocks with an arrow.

MacGillechriosd's son Christopher Macrae became constable of Eilean Donan in turn, and held the castle during yet another clan feud, this time between the Mackenzies and the MacDonalds of Glengarry. Feuding broke out in 1580 and continued for almost 25 years. In around 1602 Eilean Donan was the base for a sea skirmish at the narrows of Kyle Rhea led by Christopher's son Duncan. During the action the MacDonalds were driven on to the Cailleach Rock at the eastern tip of Skye and Angus, son of MacDonald of Glengarry, was killed. Christopher was succeeded as constable by the Rev. Murdoch Murchison, minister of Kintail.

=== 17th century ===
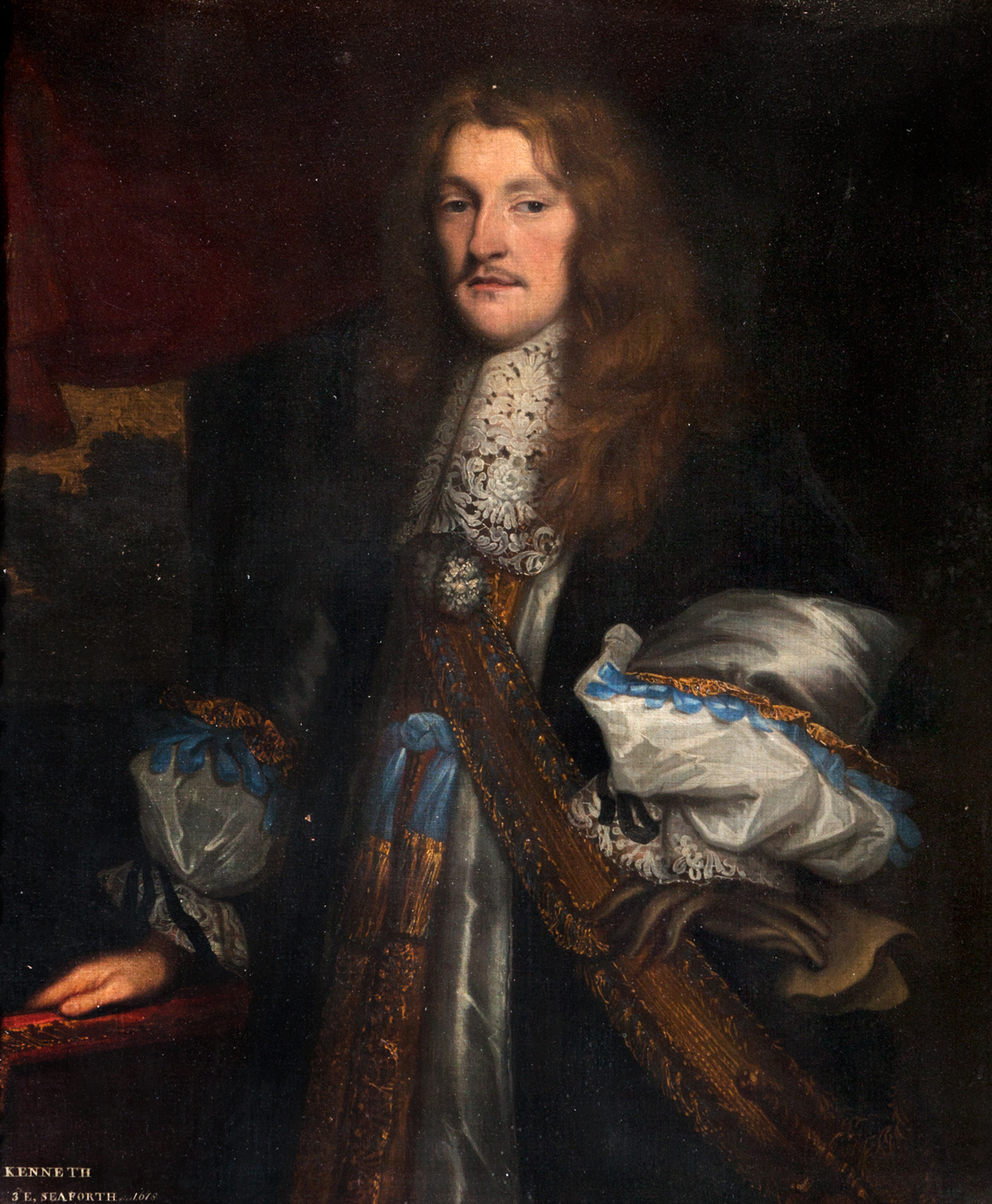
Kenneth Mackenzie, 3rd Earl of Seaforth, was brought up at Eilean Donan by Rev. Farquhar Macrae.

The Rev. Farquhar Macrae, son of Christopher Macrae, was born at the castle in 1580. After attending Edinburgh University and taking holy orders, in 1618 he was appointed constable of the castle and minister of Kintail on the death of Murdoch Murchison. Colin Mackenzie of Kintail was created Earl of Seaforth in 1623. He lived mainly at Chanonry of Ross in Fortrose, but made regular visits to Eilean Donan where the constable was required to entertain him and his retinue of between 300 and 500 retainers, as well as the neighbouring lairds. In 1635 George Mackenzie, 2nd Earl of Seaforth, appointed Farquhar as tutor to his six-year-old son Kenneth, who was subsequently raised at Eilean Donan.

In the civil wars of the mid-17th century, the Earl of Seaforth sided with Charles I. In 1650, after the king's execution, the Parliament of Scotland ordered a garrison to Eilean Donan. The local people did not welcome the garrison. When a party of 30 soldiers came out from the castle to request provisions from the local people, a band of 10 men who opposed their demands met the occupiers. An argument broke out, which led to the garrison men being driven off with several casualties. Shortly thereafter the garrison departed. The following year the Earl's brother, Simon Mackenzie of Lochslin, gathered troops for the royalist cause around Eilean Donan. For reasons unrecorded, he fell out with Farquhar Macrae and demanded his removal from the castle. Farquhar initially resisted, and despite interventions by the young Kenneth, had to be marched out by Lochslin and George Mackenzie (later Earl of Cromartie). He was finally persuaded to leave without violence, stating that he was too old to dwell in the cold castle. Farquhar was thus the last constable to dwell in Eilean Donan until its reconstruction, although he retained the ministry of Kintail until his death in 1662, at the age of 82.

After this time, the castle was briefly occupied by the Earl of Balcarres and his wife, who were in the Highlands in support of the Earl of Glencairn's royalist uprising, although Balcarres later disagreed with Glencairn and departed. In June 1654 General Monck, Oliver Cromwell's military governor in Scotland, marched through Kintail while suppressing the uprising. His troops destroyed much property, and stole 360 of Farquhar Macrae's cattle, though only one man was killed.

=== Jacobite rising and destruction of the castle ===
In 1689, King James VII of the House of Stuart was declared to have to forfeit the throne, and the crown was offered to William of Orange, in the so-called "Glorious Revolution". The revolution also established Presbyterianism in Scotland, although the Highlands generally remained Roman Catholic and loyal to the Stuarts. A series of Jacobite risings followed, leading to an increased military presence in Scotland as government forces attempted to penetrate and subdue the Highlands. In 1714 while surveying fortifications for the government, the military engineer Lewis Petit made the only surviving drawing of Eilean Donan. The sketch-elevation and carefully drawn plan show a dilapidated castle, largely roofless but for a small building by the entrance.

A major Jacobite uprising took place in 1715. Led by the Earl of Mar, it was an attempt to restore the exiled James Stuart, the "Old Pretender", to the throne. William Mackenzie, 5th Earl of Seaforth, joined the Jacobite army, leading out men of the Clan Mackenzie and Clan Macrae. The Macraes mustered at Eilean Donan, and are said to have danced on the roof of the castle before setting out to the Battle of Sheriffmuir where 58 Macraes were among the Jacobite dead. The battle was indecisive and the rising collapsed soon after.

Following the failure of the rising of 1715, the Jacobites found new support from Spain, now opposing both Britain and France in the War of the Quadruple Alliance. The Duke of Ormonde led the main invasion fleet from Spain, while an advance party of 300 Spanish soldiers under George Keith, 10th Earl Marischal, arrived in Loch Duich in April 1719, and occupied Eilean Donan Castle. The expected uprising of Highlanders did not occur, and the main Spanish invasion force never arrived. At the beginning of May, the Royal Navy sent ships to the area. Early in the morning on Sunday 10 May 1719 HMS Worcester, HMS Flamborough and HMS Enterprise anchored off Eilean Donan and sent a boat ashore under a flag of truce to negotiate. When the Spanish soldiers in the castle fired at the boat, it was recalled and all three frigates opened fire on the castle for an hour or more. The next day the bombardment continued while a landing party was prepared. In the evening under the cover of an intense cannonade, a detachment went ashore in the ships' boats and captured the castle against little resistance. According to Worcester's log, in the castle were "an Irishman, a captain, a Spanish lieutenant, a serjeant, one Scottish rebel and 39 Spanish soldiers, 343 barrels of powder and 52 barrels of musquet shot." The naval force spent the next two days in the castle and landed 27 barrels of gunpowder. The frigates' official logs are curiously worded, perhaps to conceal the reputed fact that the Macraes succeeded in destroying the castle although in naval hands, in order to prevent the English from garrisoning it: at all events, the castle was demolished by the gunpowder exploding. Flamborough then took the Spanish prisoners to Edinburgh. The remaining Spanish troops were defeated on 10 June at the Battle of Glen Shiel.

=== Restoration and reuse ===
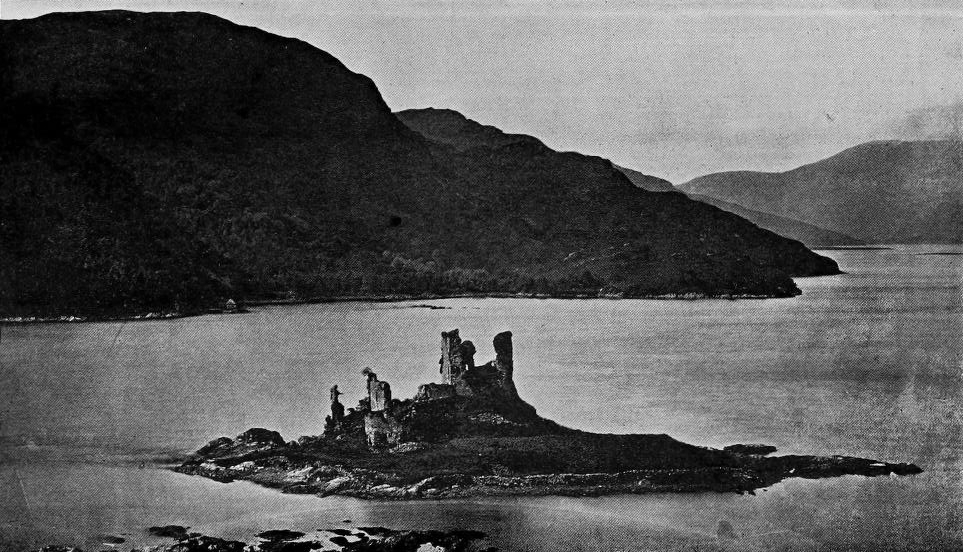
Castle ruins, sometime before 1911

Between 1919 and 1932, the castle was rebuilt by Lt. Col. John MacRae-Gilstrap. The restoration included the construction of an arched bridge to give easier access to the island. Macrae-Gilstrap also established a war memorial dedicated to the men of the MacRae clan who died in the First World War. The memorial is adorned with lines from John McCrae's poem "In Flanders Fields", and is flanked by grey field guns from the war. Eilean Donan was opened to the public in 1955, and has since become a popular attraction: over 314,000 people visited in 2009, making it the third-most-visited castle in Scotland. In 1983 ownership of the castle was transferred to the Conchra Charitable Trust, established by the Macrae family to maintain and restore the castle, and a purpose-built visitor centre was opened on the landward side of the bridge in 1998.

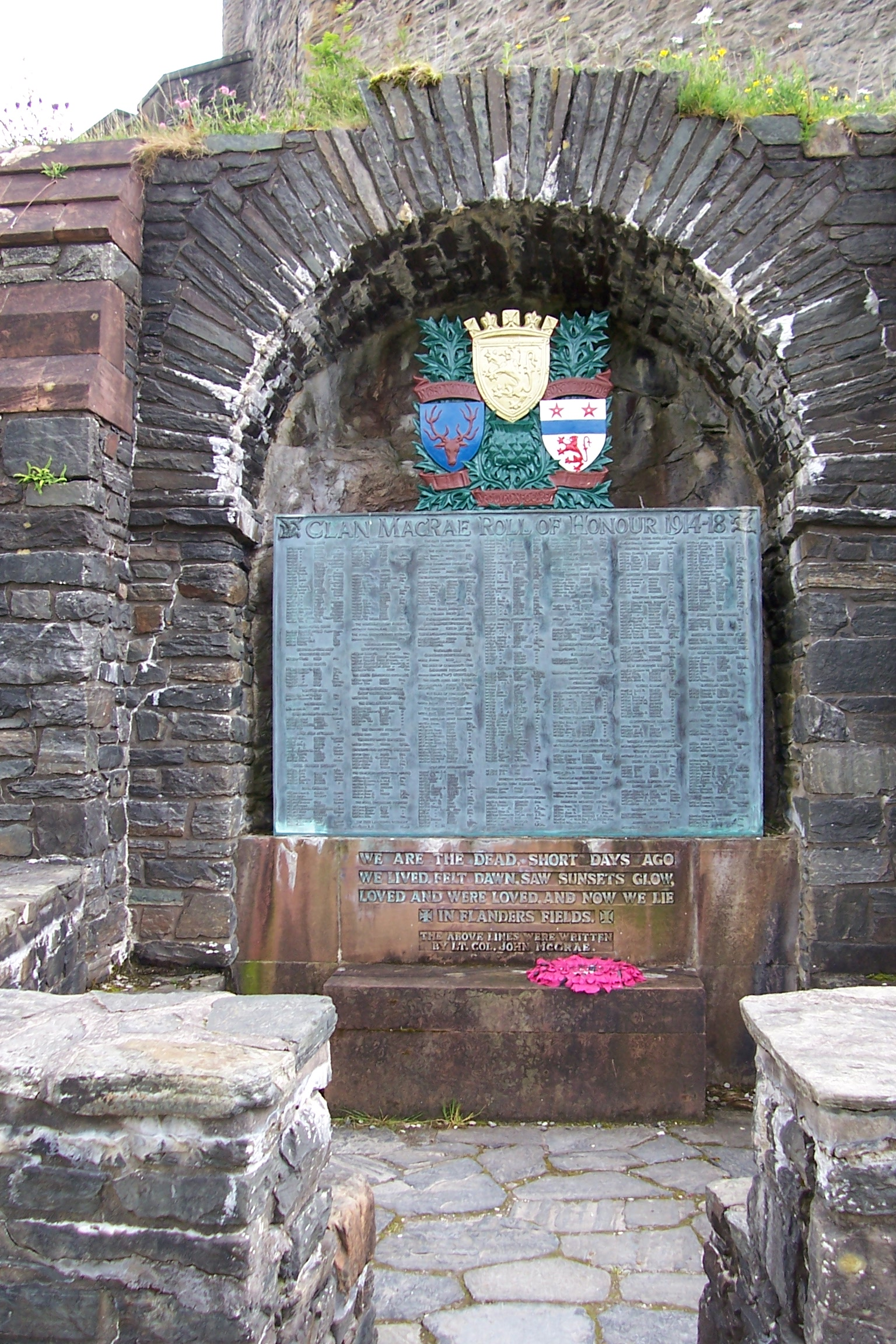
Clan MacRae Roll of Honour inside Eilean Donan Castle grounds, added during the restoration

The castle is regularly described as one of the most photographed monuments in Scotland, and is a recognised Scottish icon, frequently appearing on packaging and advertising for shortbread, whisky and other products. Eilean Donan has made several appearances in films, beginning with Bonnie Prince Charlie in 1948 and The Master of Ballantrae in 1953. It featured in the opening episode of the 1976 TV series, The New Avengers. The castle was the setting for the 1980 short film Black Angel, filmed to accompany screenings of The Empire Strikes Back in cinemas. In 1984, Scottish singer and composer Jesse Rae filmed his music video "Over The Sea" at the location. It featured prominently in Highlander (1986) as the home of Clan MacLeod. It also featured prominently in Mio in the Land of Faraway (1987) as the home of the antagonist Kato, played by Christopher Lee. It was the backdrop to a dance scene in the Bollywood movie Kuch Kuch Hota Hai in 1998. In 1999, it served as the Scottish headquarters of MI6 in The World Is Not Enough. In 2007, Eilean Donan stood in for Fotheringhay Castle in England in Elizabeth: The Golden Age. In the movie Made of Honor Eilean Donan can be seen as home of the groom's family. The Tamil song "Kandukondain Kandukondain" from the movie of the same name was filmed in this location.

== Architectural development ==
Eilean Donan Castle went through several phases of development from the earliest fortifications of the 13th century through to its destruction in 1719, and the subsequent reconstruction in the 20th century. The first phase comprised a curtain wall enclosing much of the island with a tower house added in the 14th century. In the 14th or 15th century the outer wall was abandoned and a smaller enclosure built around the tower house. More development within this courtyard took place in the 16th century, as well as the addition of defences on the eastern side. The castle was almost totally destroyed in 1719, after which almost 200 years passed before reconstruction began. Although some archaeological evidence has been recovered from the island, much material was lost during the reconstruction works making it difficult to build a clear picture of the early castle. Very little historical evidence survives. Mapmaker Timothy Pont (c. 1565–1614) left a description:

The castell of Ylen Donen is composed of a strong and fair dungeon [i.e. a donjon or keep] upon a rock, with another tower compasd with a fair barmkin wall, with orchards and trees, al within ane yland of the lenth of twa pair of butts [i.e. archery butts] almost round. It is sayd of old that castel consisted of seven tours.

The only drawing of the castle prior to its destruction was made in 1714 by Lewis Petit (c. 1665–1720), a military engineer with the Board of Ordnance who came to Scotland in 1714 to survey Fort William and other defences in the area. Among the drawings he produced are a plan and elevation of Eilean Donan, which clearly show that the castle was largely derelict by this time, with only a building at the southeast corner being roofed.

Development of Eilean Donan Castle

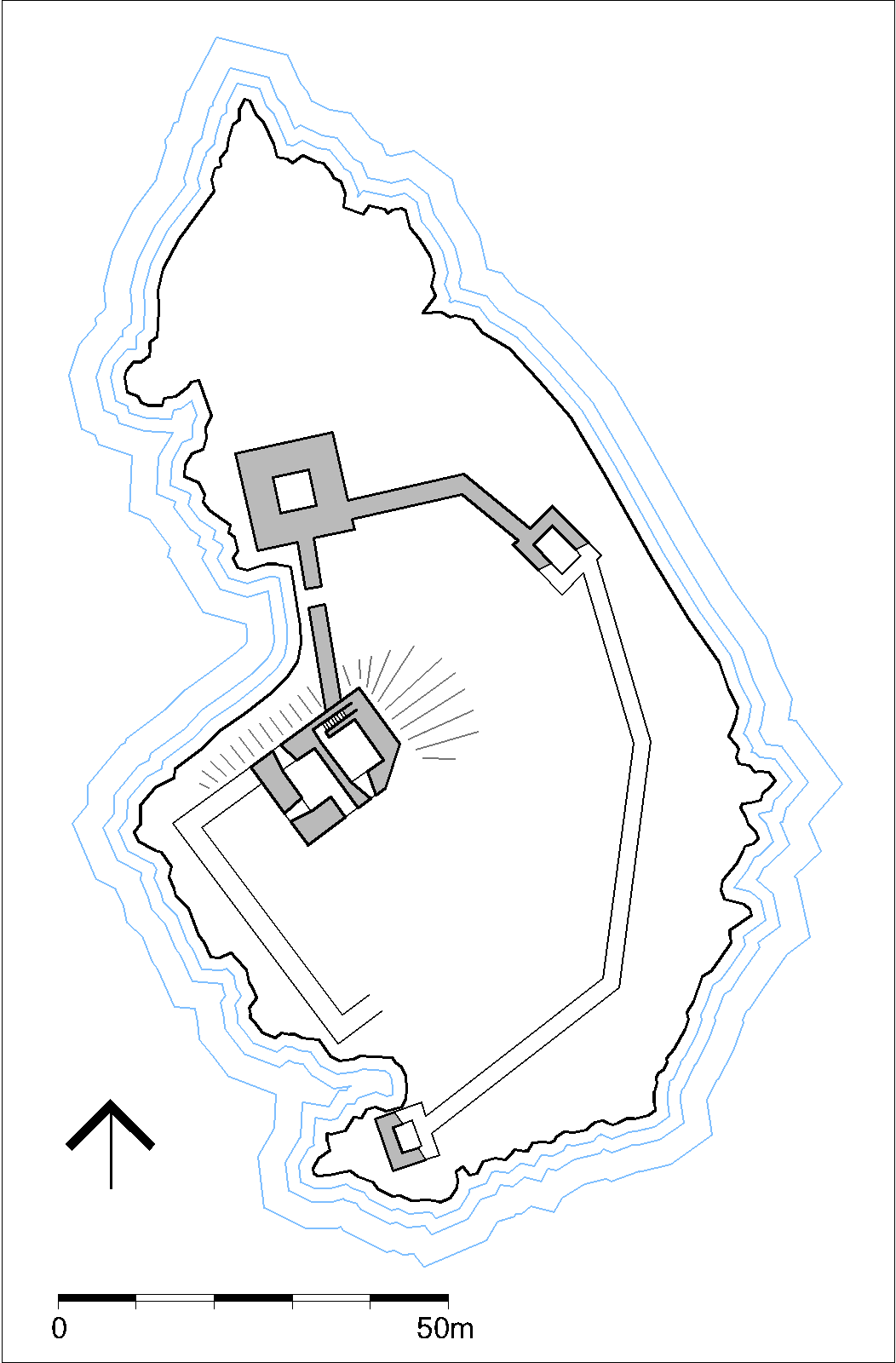
The 13th-century curtain wall enclosed most of the island

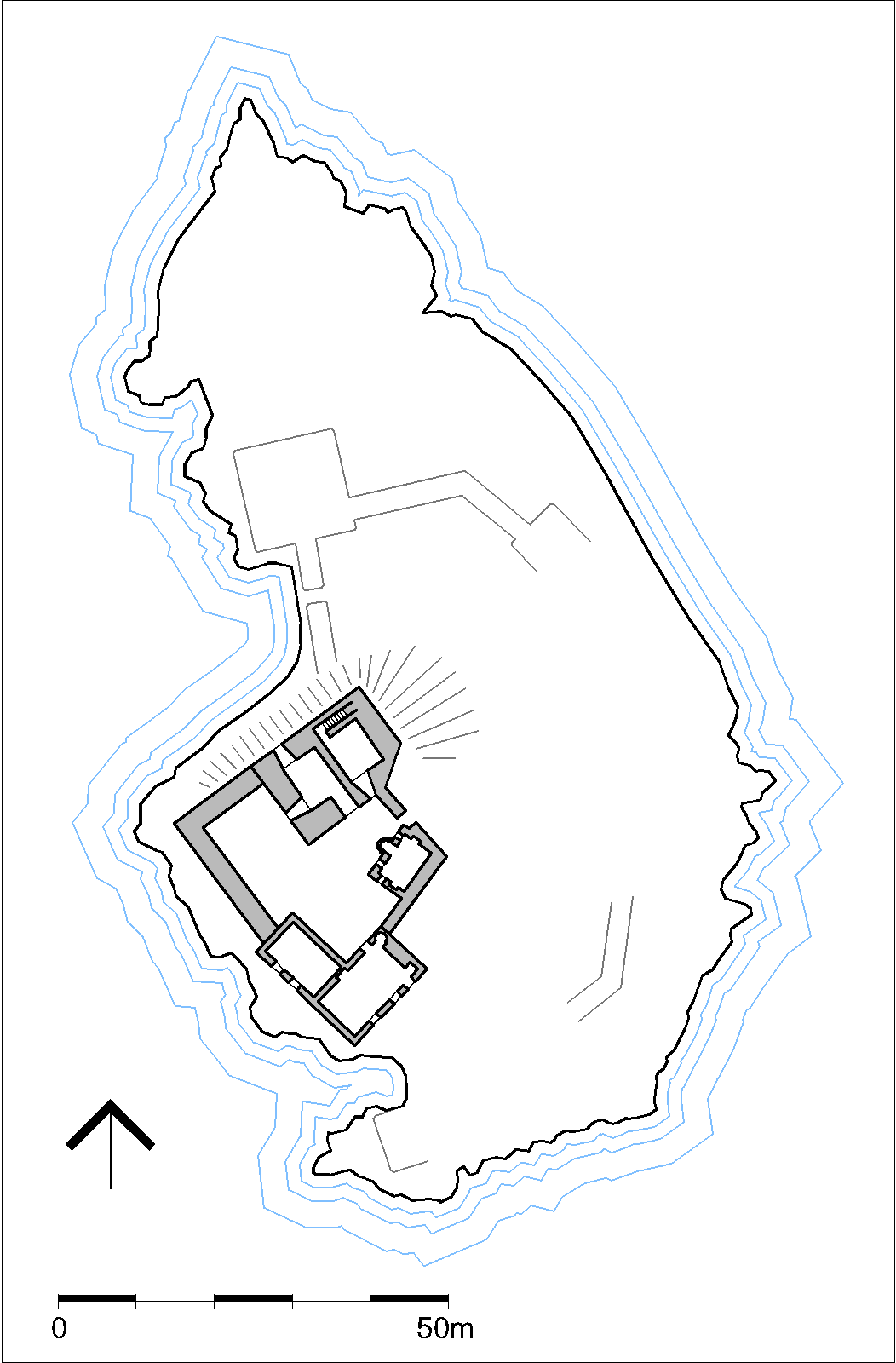
The smaller enclosure in the 15th century, and the 16th-century buildings

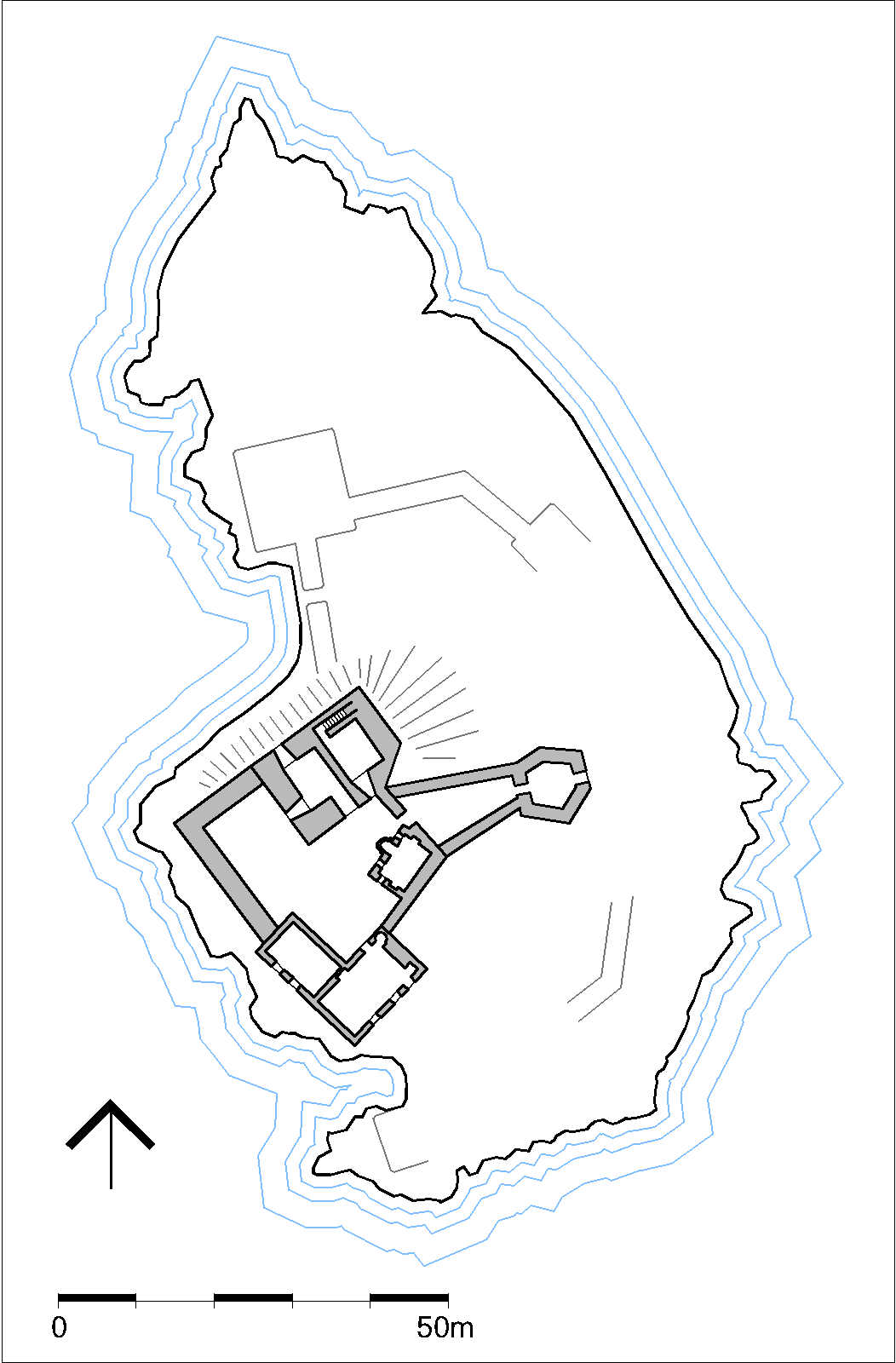
Addition of the "hornwork" in the later 16th century

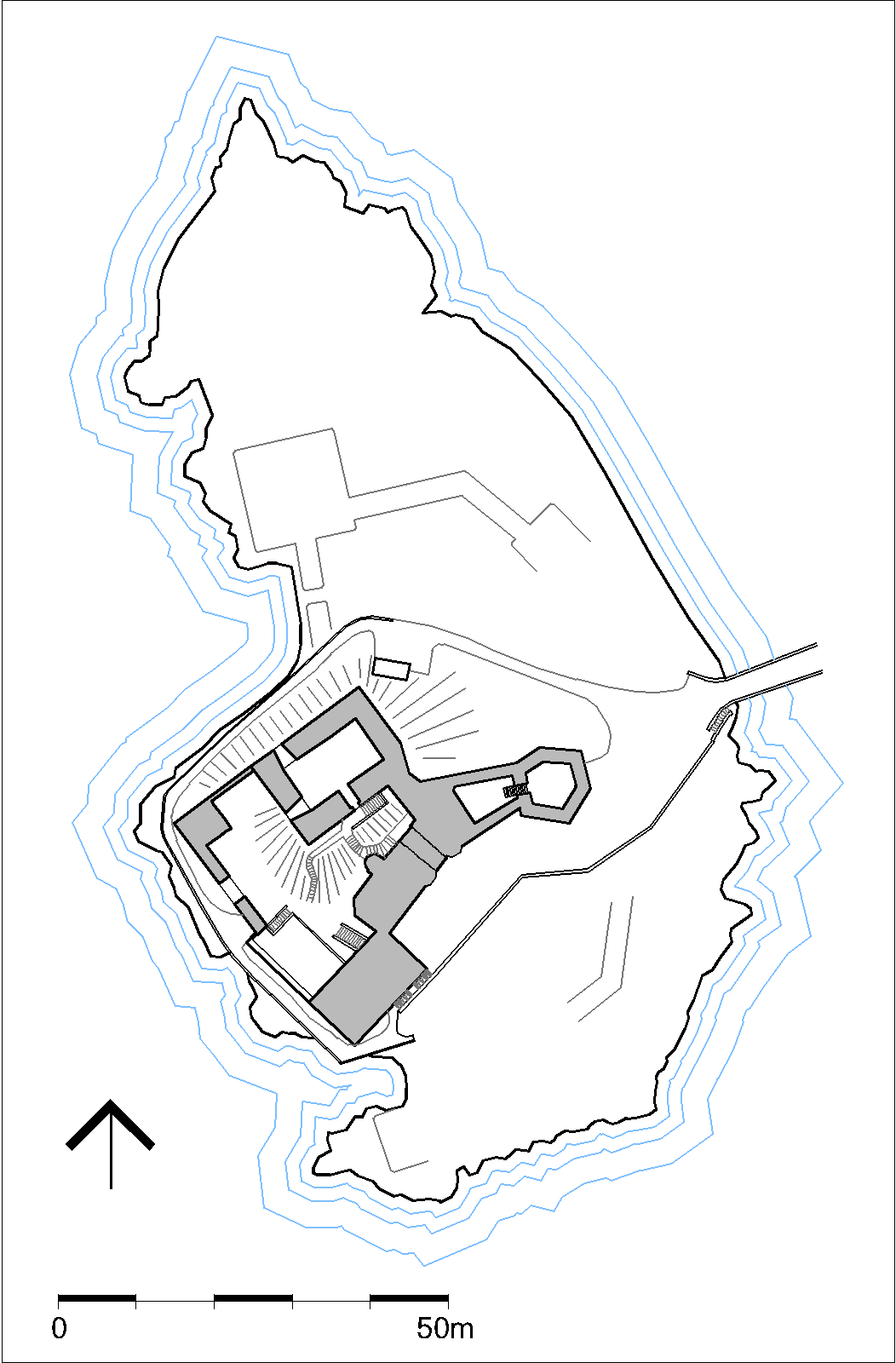
Following reconstruction in the 20th century

=== Early enclosure ===
In the 13th century, a curtain wall or wall of enceinte was constructed around the island, enclosing most of the area above the high tide line. Scant remains of these walls can be traced on the ground, running around the northern end of the island. The eastern and southern segments of this wall are largely obscured by later development, although the enclosure is assumed to have contained an area of around 3,000 square metres (32,000 square feet). At the northern point of the wall the foundations of a large tower survive, measuring around 12 by 13 metres (39 by 43 ft) and the remains of foundations suggest further towers at the north-east and southwest corners of the enclosure. The enclosure was accessed via a sea-gate in the north-west curtain wall, where a small beach would have allowed boats to be drawn up. Another beach to the southwest may have formed a second access. Archaeological excavations in 2008 and 2009 confirmed the presence of these walls, and also found evidence that metalworking was taking place in the northern part of the castle. A tower house or keep was built against the curtain wall at the high point of the island, probably in the 14th century. The tower measured 16.5 by 12.4 m (54 ft 2 in by 40 ft 8 in), with walls 3 m (9 ft 10 in) thick. The vaulted ground floor was originally divided in two, with a stair in the north wall giving access to the first-floor hall. Above this were probably another two storeys, including a garret. The tower, according to Petit's later drawing, was topped by crowstep gables, and surrounded by a walkway and bartizans (small turrets) at the corners.

=== Reduced castle ===
At an unknown period, probably in the later 14th century or early 15th century, the outer wall was abandoned in favour of a smaller defensive enclosure, around 25 m (82 ft) square. The entrance to this smaller courtyard was from the east. The reasons for this change are unclear, though it is suggested that the smaller area would have been easier to defend. During the 16th century, two buildings were added to the southern periphery of the enclosure. A small house was constructed within the southeast angle of the wall, with a circular stair-tower on its northern side giving access to the walkway along the eastern curtain wall. Located just inside the gate, this is likely to have served as a house for the castle's constable or keeper, and is the only building shown with a roof on Petit's survey. At the southwest corner of the enclosure, an L-plan block was put up, possibly as late as the early 17th century. The southern part is sited outside the line of the inner curtain wall, with a northern wing, which may have been a slightly later addition, inside the wall.

=== Hornwork ===
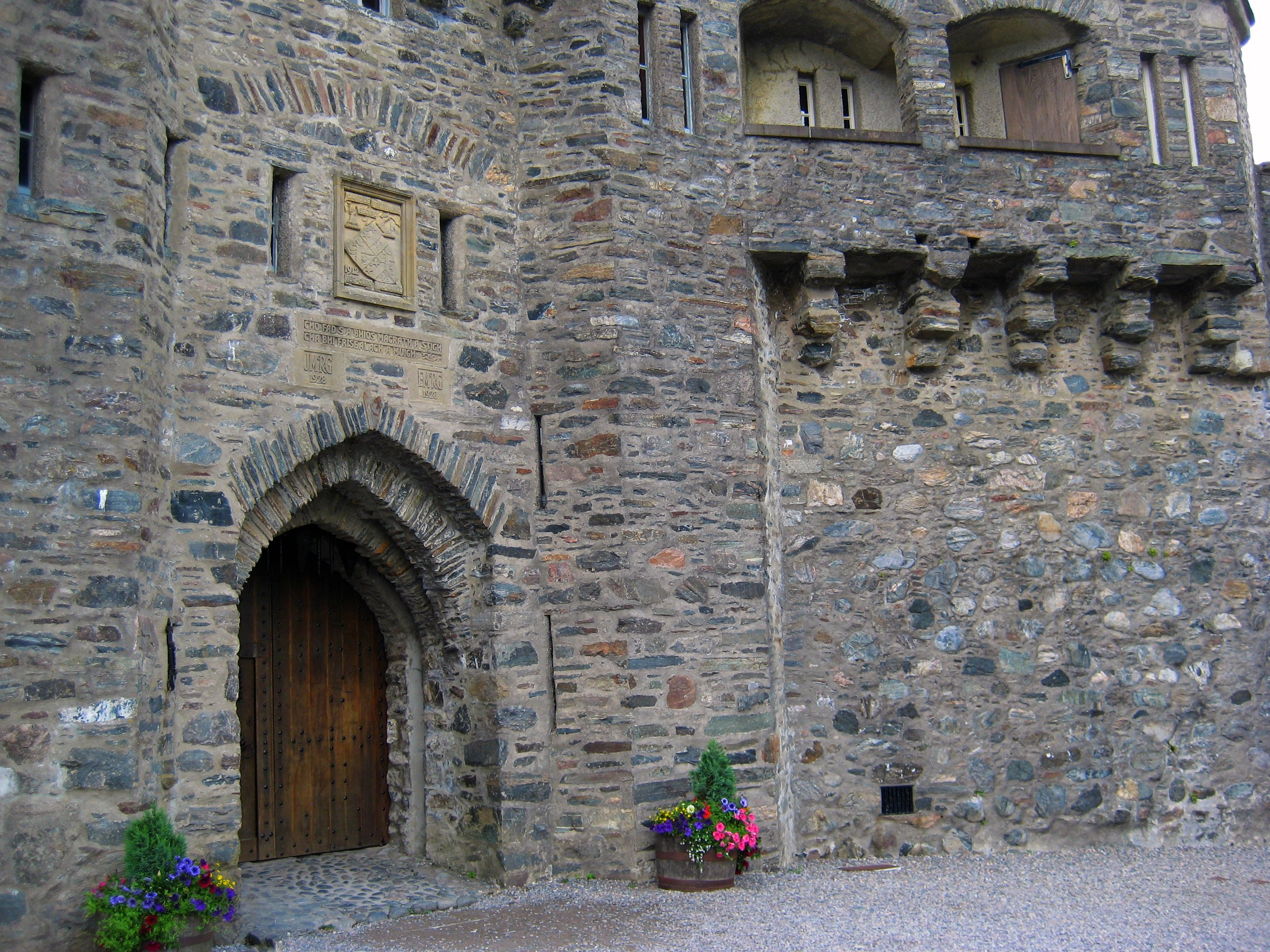
The reconstructed entrance to the castle

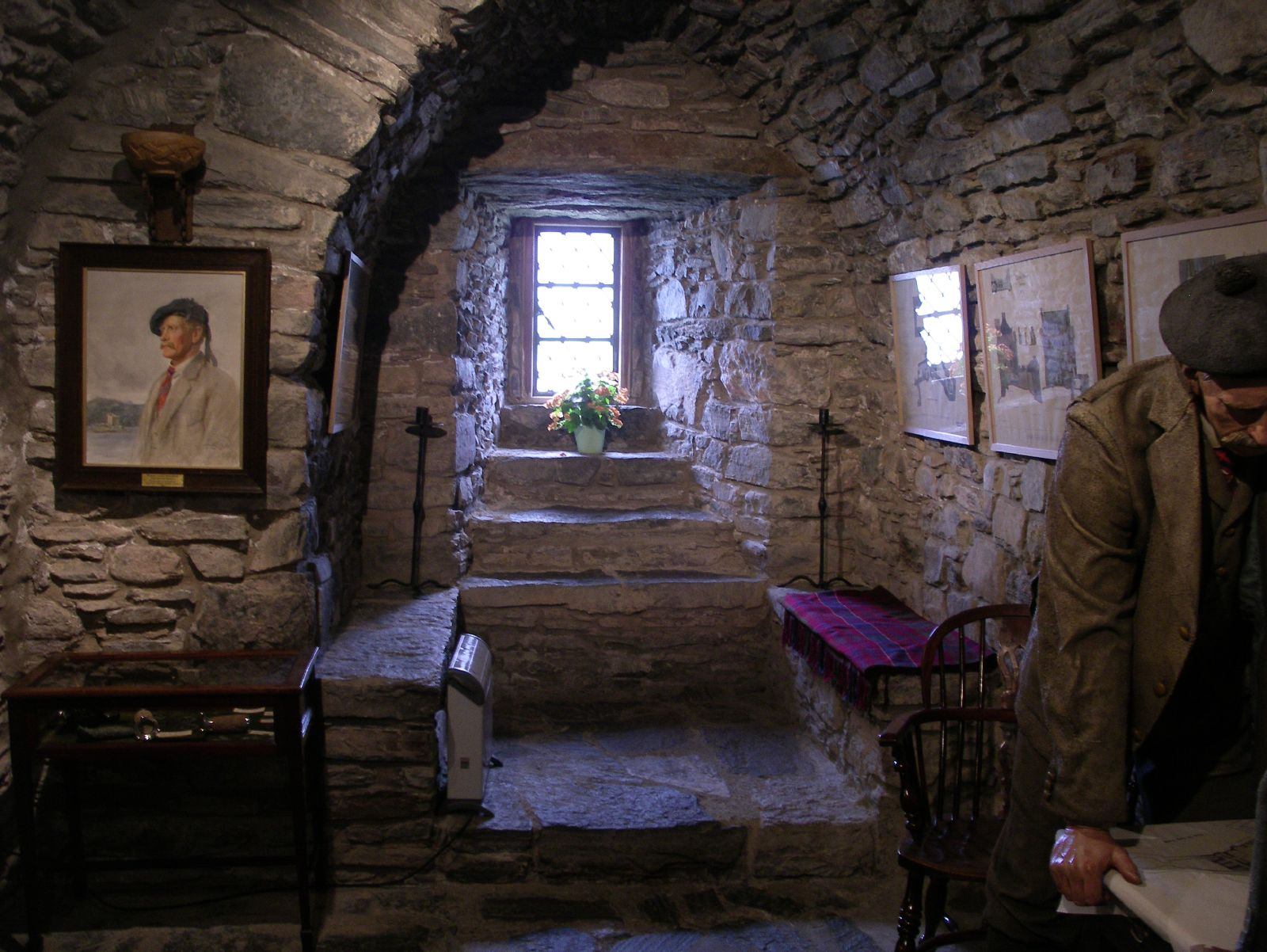
A mural chamber within the keep

In the later 16th century, the castle was extended eastward to create a bastion or "hornwork", providing a more securely defended entrance. The hornwork comprises a pair of walls enclosing a triangular courtyard, linking the east wall of the castle with an irregular hexagonal (or heptagonal) structure. This structure, 11.5 m (37 ft 9 in) across, contains a well at its lowest level, 5 m (16 ft) across and 10 m (33 ft) deep. This led MacGibbon and Ross to describe the structure as a water tower or cistern. However, the presence of a door on its eastern side is shown in 19th century photographs, indicating that it was built as the main entrance to the castle. The water-filled interior would have been crossed by a removable bridge, presenting an obstacle to attackers. From the bridge, access to the castle would have been up a flight of steps, into the triangular courtyard, and through the gate in the east curtain wall. It is possible that the hexagonal bastion was roofed to serve as an artillery position. Dredging of the reservoir in 1893 recovered two brass guns, referred to as "double hagbuts", and measuring around 1 m (3 ft) long with a bore of around 25 millimetres (1 in). Also recovered was a yett, an iron gate, probably installed in the east door to the bastion, but now on display inside the castle. At some point in the 17th century, this elaborate access was abandoned and a more convenient entrance opened in the south wall of the hornwork. By 1714, Lewis Petit's drawing clearly shows that the castle was largely derelict, with only the house at the southeast corner being roofed. Four years later, it was completely demolished, and, by 1912, very little of the castle was still standing.

=== Modern castle ===
The present castle buildings are entirely the result of 20th-century reconstruction by Macrae-Gilstrap, who commissioned Edinburgh architect George Mackie Watson to draw up the plans. Although the rebuilding followed the extant ground plan, the details of the present castle differ from its original appearance. The survey drawings by Lewis Petit were not rediscovered until the restoration was almost complete, and the restorers therefore were forced to rely on less accurate interpretations such as the work of MacGibbon and Ross, who attempted a plan of the remains in the late 19th century. The clerk of works, Farquhar Macrae, is said to have based the reconstruction on a dream in which he saw the restored Eilean Donan. Rather than a genuinely medieval castle, Eilean Donan is described as "a romantic reincarnation in the tradition of early 20th-century castle revivals." John Gifford, analysing the building against the Petit survey, notes a "fussy elaboration of what was probably plain originally, and an omission of decoration where it once existed", and describes the interior as "a rubbly Edwardian stage-set for life in the Middle Ages".

The castle is today entered from the south, via a modern portal complete with a portcullis. Above the door is a Gaelic inscription which in translation reads: "As long as there is a Macrae inside, there will never be a Fraser outside", referring to a bond of kinship between the two clans, and a similar inscription which once adorned the Fraser's home at Beaufort Castle. Above this is carved the coat of arms of John Macrae-Gilstrap. The portal gives access to the courtyard, the level of which has been lowered exposing the bedrock around the tower house. The present buildings at the southeast of the castle reflect the form of the earlier structures, including the circular stair tower, but are larger in extent. To the southwest only the southern portion of the L-shaped block was reconstructed, as a plain three-storey house, while in place of the northern wing is an open platform giving views over the loch. A small tower occupies the north-west angle. The keep itself follows the original dimensions, though the formerly subdivided ground floor is now a single room: the tunnel-vaulted Billeting Hall. Above on the first floor is the Banqueting Hall with an oak ceiling, and decorated with coats of arms and 15th-century style fireplace. The main ceiling beams in the Banqueting Hall are of Douglas Fir and were shipped from British Columbia, Canada as a gift from the Macraes of Canada. Small mural chambers within the walls are accessed from each hall.

== Gallery ==
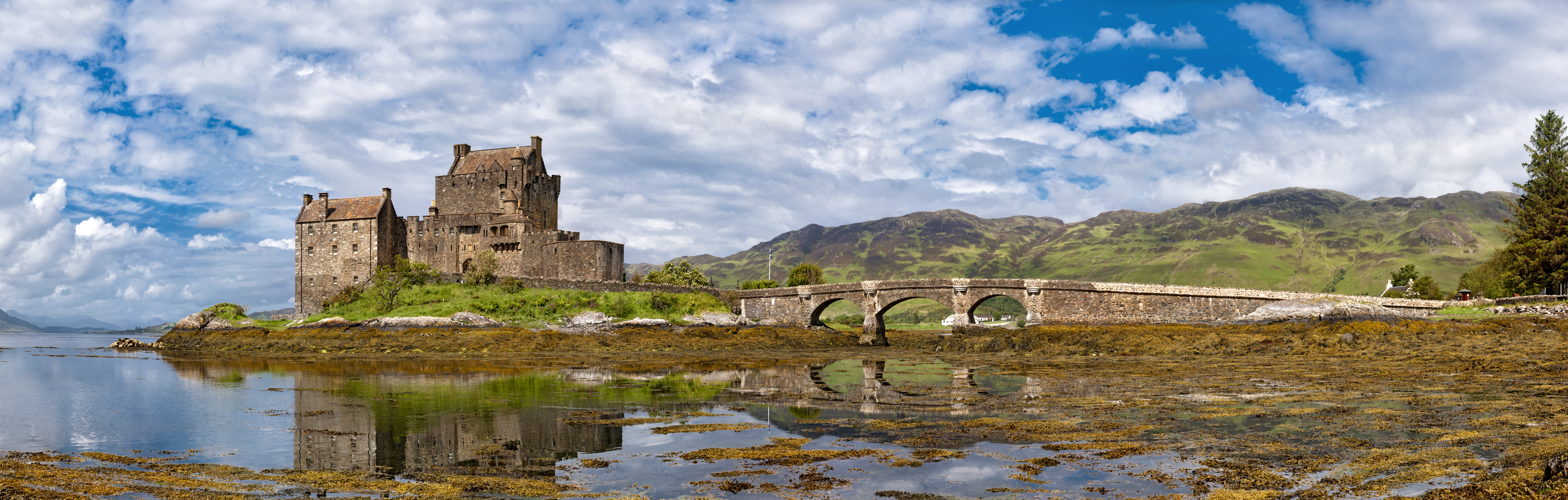
Panorama of the castle from the south

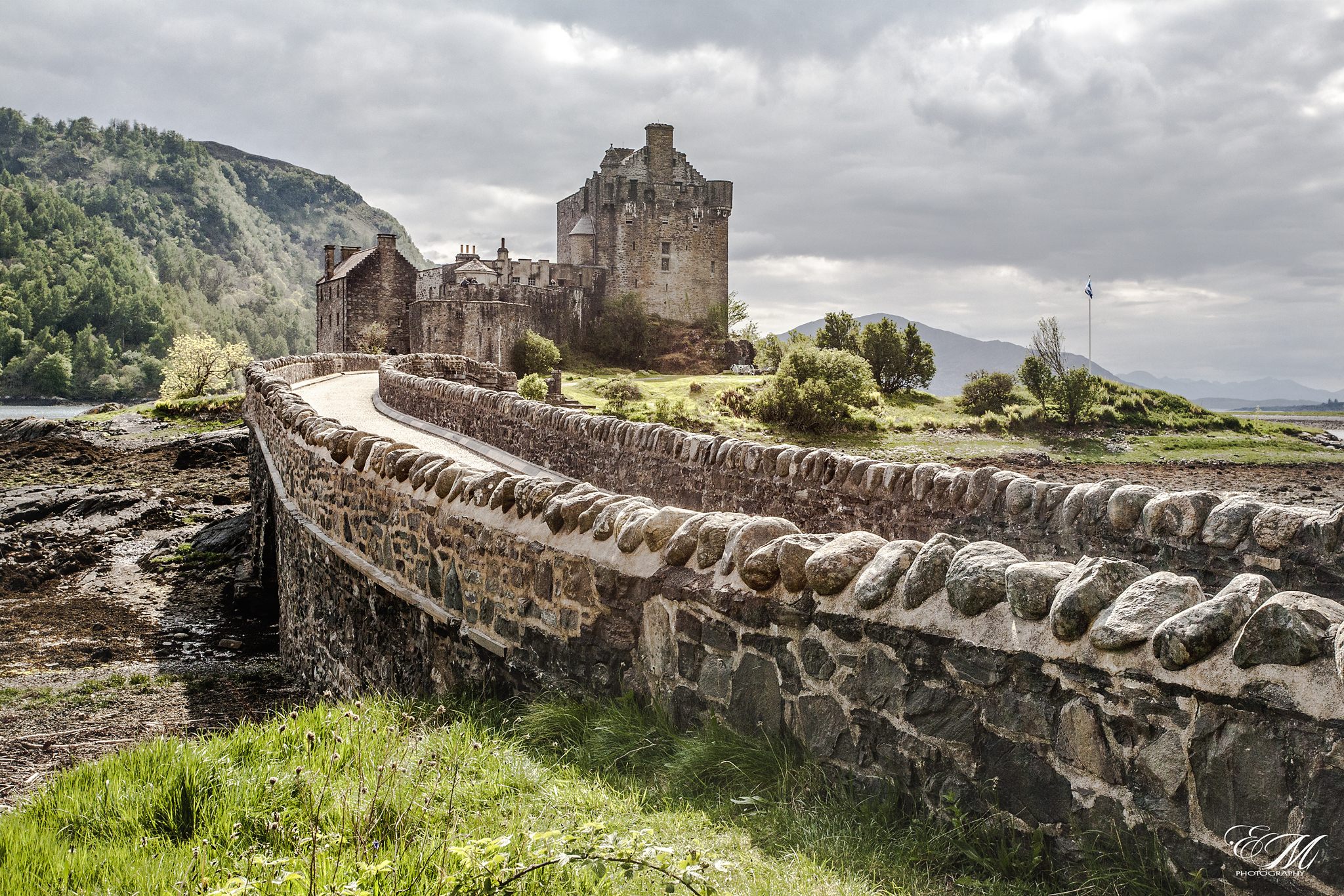
View of the bridge

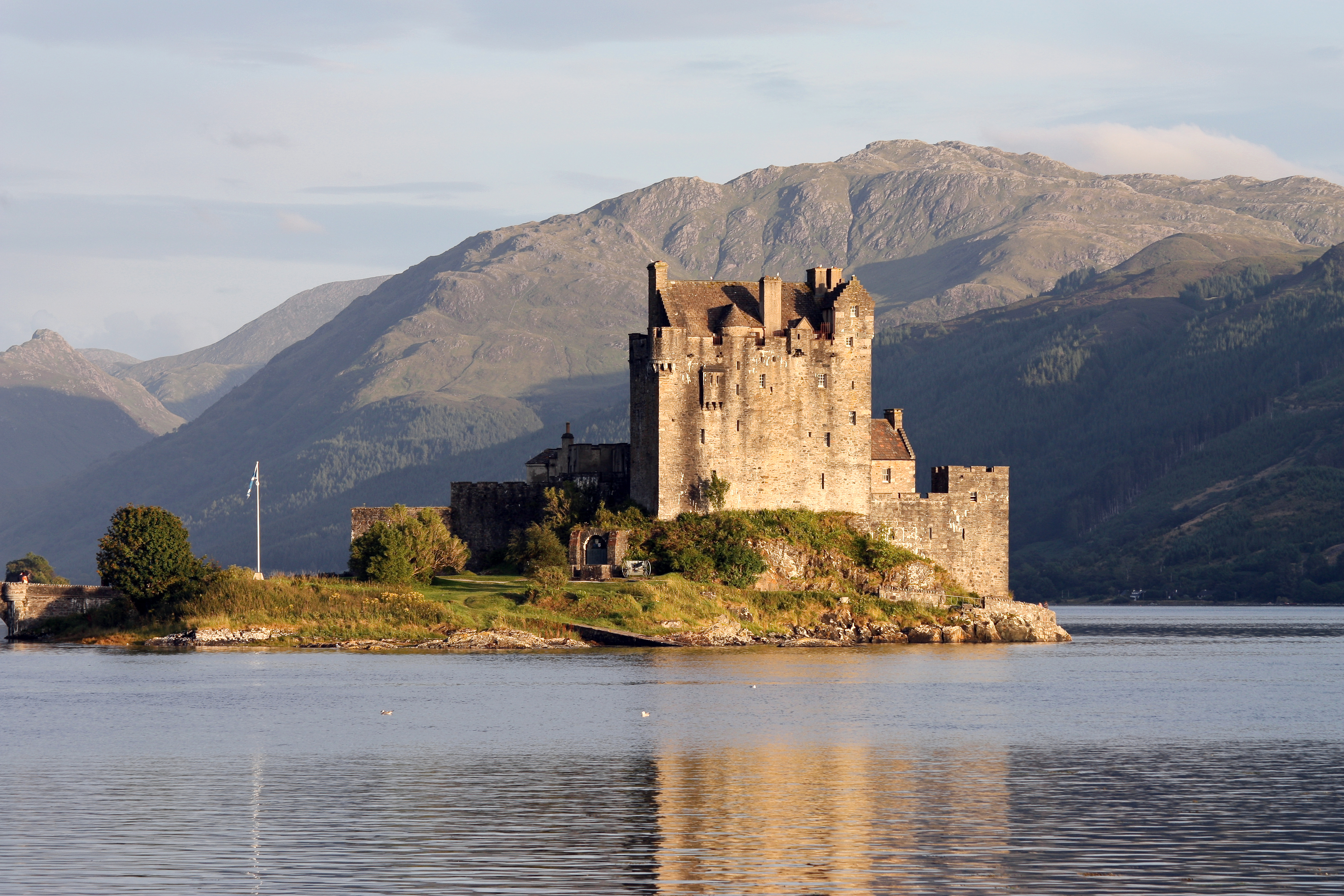
The castle, seen from the west

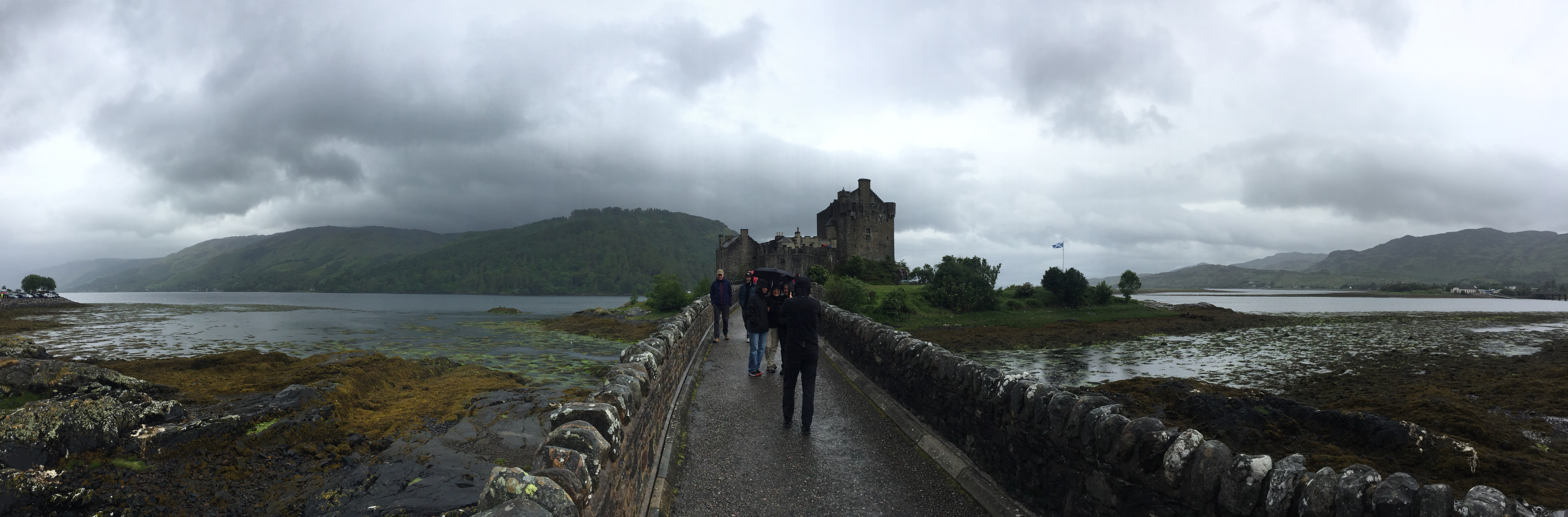
Looking down the bridge to the castle

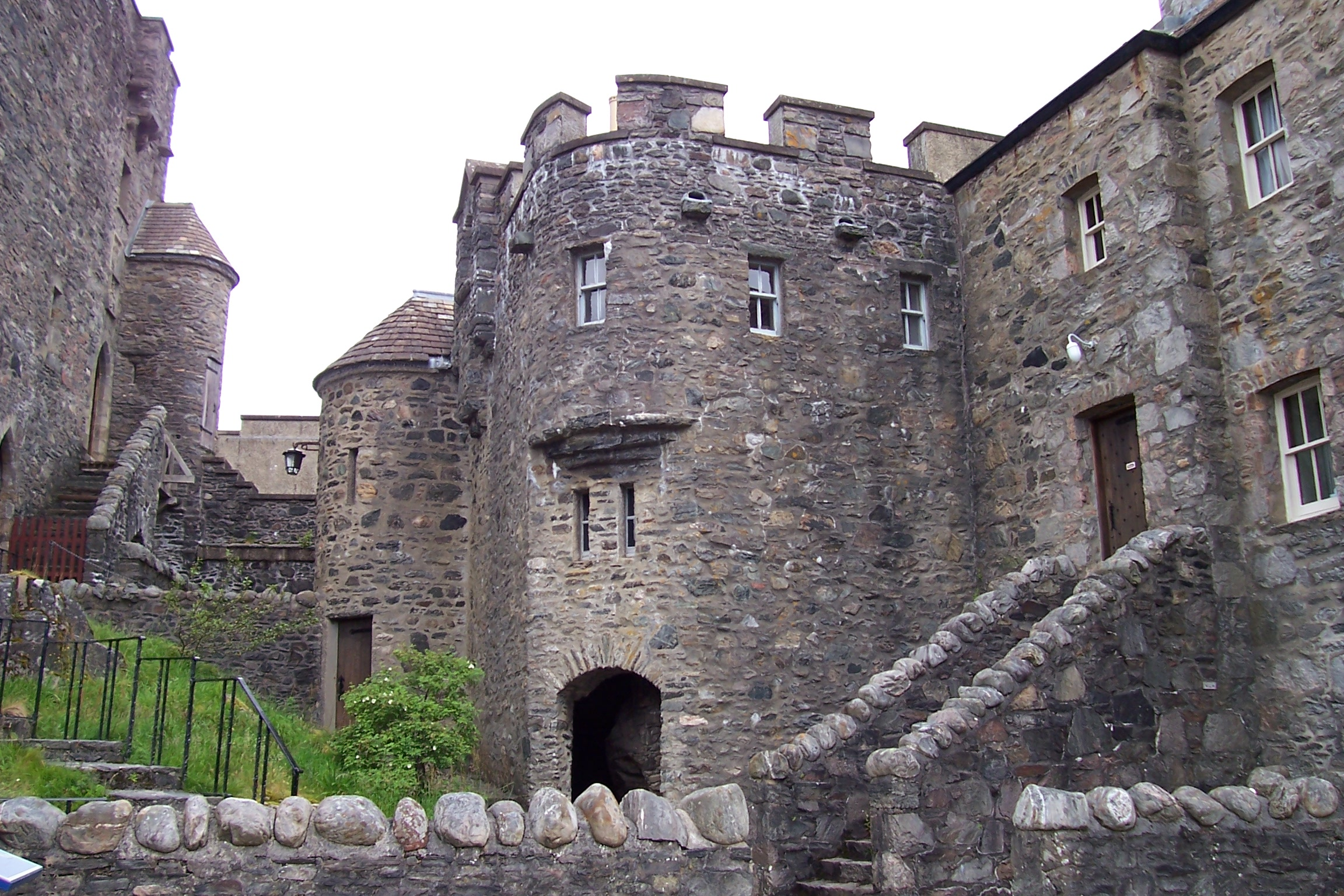
View from inside the castle grounds

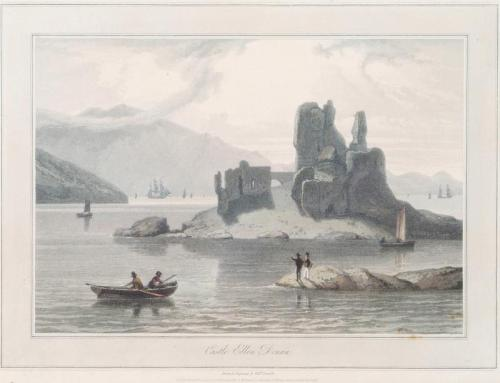
Castle Eilen Donan - painting by William Daniell - 1818

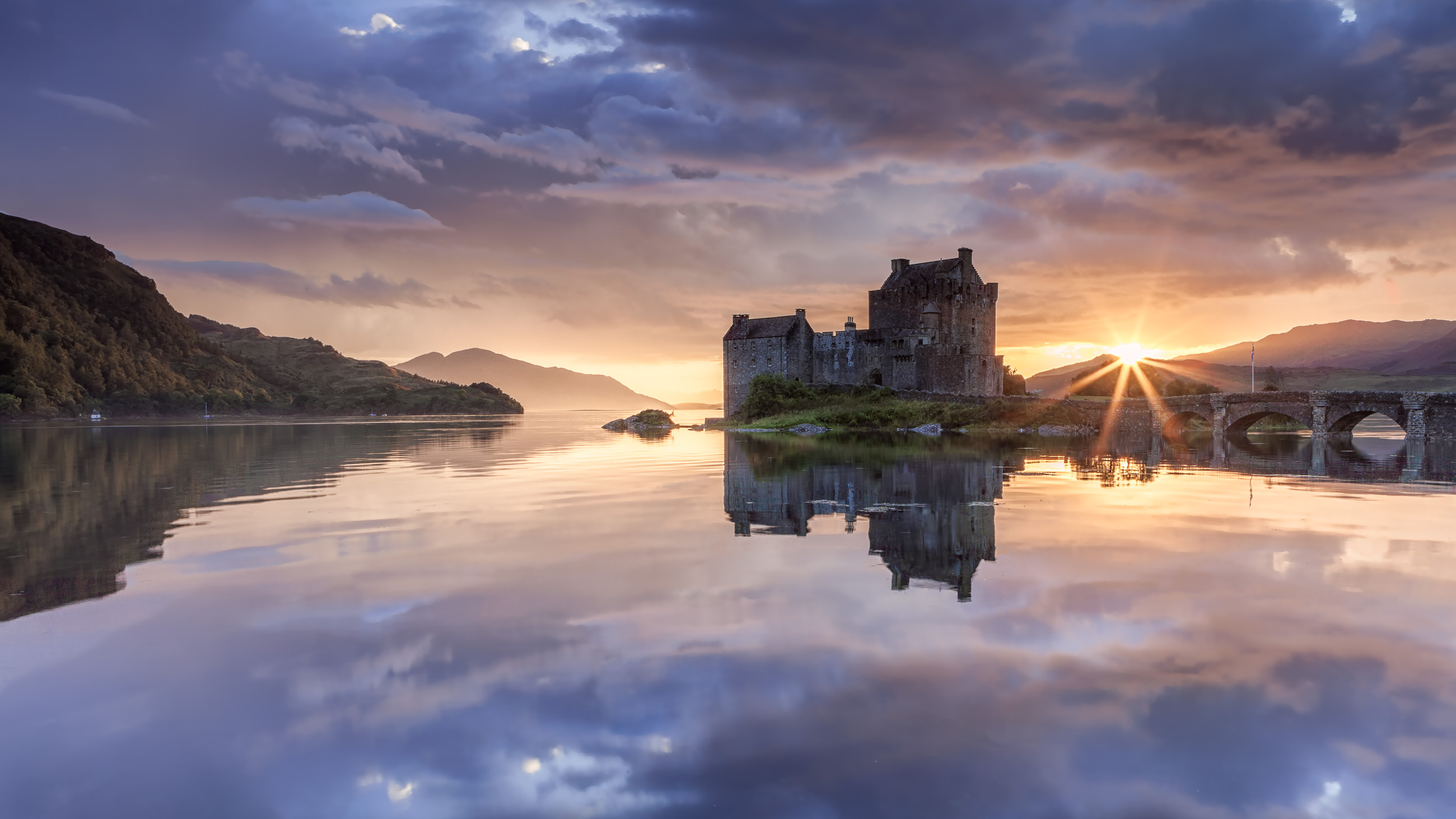
The castle, seen from the south at dusk

== See also ==
- List of islands of Scotland
