= Donnchadh MacRath =

Donnchadh MacRath (d. c. 1700), also known as Duncan MacRae of Inverinate and Donnchadh nam Pìos, was a Scottish Gaelic poet and the compiler of the Fernaig manuscript which he committed to paper using an English-influenced system of orthography.

== Origins ==
He was the son and heir of Alexander Macrae of Inverinate, who served as Chamberlain of Kintail to the third Earl of Seaforth, by his first wife, Margaret, the daughter of Murdoch Mackenzie of Redcastle. The Macraes of Inverinate were an old and well-established family, long associated with the Mackenzies and the castle at Eilean Donan. Donnchadh was, by traditional reckoning, 9th of Inverinate.

== Reputation ==
Donnchadh was himself the author of many of the poems in his compilation. His poems suggest Jacobite and Non-Juring High Church Episcopalian sympathies tempered with a spirit of toleration. The local oral tradition contains many tales of his ingenuity in practical matters and Professor Mackinnon in The Transactions of the Gaelic Society of Inverness (Volume XI) provided this assessment of him:

"...undoubtedly Duncan Macrae, the engineer and mechanician, the ardent ecclesiastic, the keen though liberal-minded politician, the religious poet, and collector of the literature of his countrymen, is as different from the popular conception of a Highland Chief of the Revolution as can well be conceived."

He also appears in a catalogue of heroes from Kintail in Time and Sgurr Urain, a poem by Sorley MacLean:

And Duncan of the Silver Cups
in high-wooded Inverinate.

== Death ==
Donnchadh died some time between 1693 and 1704. Many local traditions grew up around his death by drowning in the river Chonaig, near Dorusduain: it is said that he was returning from a visit to the Chisholm to purchase the lands of Affric, and that the deeds to Affric were lost in the incident (conveniently or inconveniently, depending on one's point of view).

== Family and posterity ==
Donnchadh married Janet, daughter of Alexander Macleod of Raasay. She was served heir with her sister Julia to the Raasay estates in 1688, but local resistance to the sisters' claims ultimately proved successful. (A surviving sasine records that Julia sold her rights to their cousin, another Alexander Macleod, in 1692.) A satirical West Coast ditty entitled Cailleach Liath Rasaidh ("The Greyhaired Hag of Raasay") is said to have been inspired by local chagrin over the surrender.

Donnchadh and Janet had at least three sons and two daughters, including Donnchadh's heir Farquhar, who died in 1711.

Through their mutual descent from Alasdair MacRae, 8th of Inverinate, North Carolina Loyalist war poet Iain mac Mhurchaidh, who is a highly important figure in 18th-century Scottish Gaelic literature, was the first cousin once removed of Donnchadh MacRath.
