= Clan MacRae =

Highland Scottish clan

- Crest: A cubit arm grasping a sword all Proper
- Motto: Fortitudine
- Slogan: Sgùrr Uaran

Profile
- Region: Scottish Highlands
- District: Wester Ross; Sutherland
- Plant badge: Club moss
- Clan MacRae no longer has a chief, and is an armigerous clan
- Historic seat: Eilean Donan
- Last Chief: MacRae of Inverinate
Allied clans
Clan Mackenzie
Clan Fraser
Clan Matheson
Rival clans
Clan Ross
Clan Logan
Clan MacDonald of Sleat

The Clan MacRae is a Highland Scottish clan. The clan has no chief; it is therefore considered an armigerous clan.

== Surname ==
The surname MacRae "or Macrath, as it is written in Gaelic, means 'son of Grace or Luck'". Alexander Macrae speculates in his history of the clan that "it may have been first given as a distinguishing personal name to men who were supposed to be endowed with more than an ordinary measure of sanctity or grace."

== Traditional origins of the clan ==
According to the late 19th-century historian Alexander Mackenzie, and Rev. Alexander Macrae in the early 20th century, the main authority for the early history of Clan Macrae is the late 17th-century manuscript account of the clan written by Rev. John Macrae. Alexander Macrae largely based his history of the clan upon John Macrae's earlier account.

According to tradition, the Macraes were originally from Ireland and shared a common ancestry with the Mackenzies and Macleans. The Macraes were said to have originated from Clunes, which is located near the southern shore of the Beauly Firth, and was within the lordship of Lovat. Alexander Macrae stated that these traditions likely refer to a period sometime in the middle of the 13th century.

According to John Macrae, after a violent dispute arose between the Macraes and more powerful Frasers of Lovat, three sons of the Macrae chief set off for new lands. One of the sons settled in Brahan, near Dingwall (later the site of Brahan Castle); another settled in Argyll; and the other settled in Kintail.

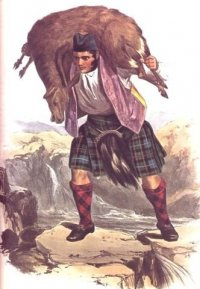
A romanticised Victorian-era illustration of a Macrae clansman by R. R. McIan from The Clans of the Scottish Highlands published in 1845

At that time Kintail was held by the Mackenzies, and according to John Macrae's account, there were very few Mackenzies of the chiefly line and thus the chief of that clan welcomed the Macraes because they shared a common descent and could be relied upon. Although John Macrae did not know the name of the Macrae brother who settled in Kintail, he stated that this Macrae brother married the daughter, or granddaughter, of Macbeolan who possessed a large part of Kintail before Mackenzie's rise to power. (Note: Forms of the name Macbeolan, or O'beolan, were applied to describe the early earls of Ross; however, according to historian Alexander Grant, the Gaelic name Beólan, meaning "little mouth", was fairly common and may have been used as a nickname. Grant stated that the Macbeolan referred to in Macrae tradition does not necessarily refer to the Earls of Ross.) Alexander Mackenzie considered this marriage to be the real reason for the loyalty given by the Macraes to their Mackenzie lords; he did not believe the Macraes and Mackenzies to share a common ancestry in the male line as John Macrae had claimed.

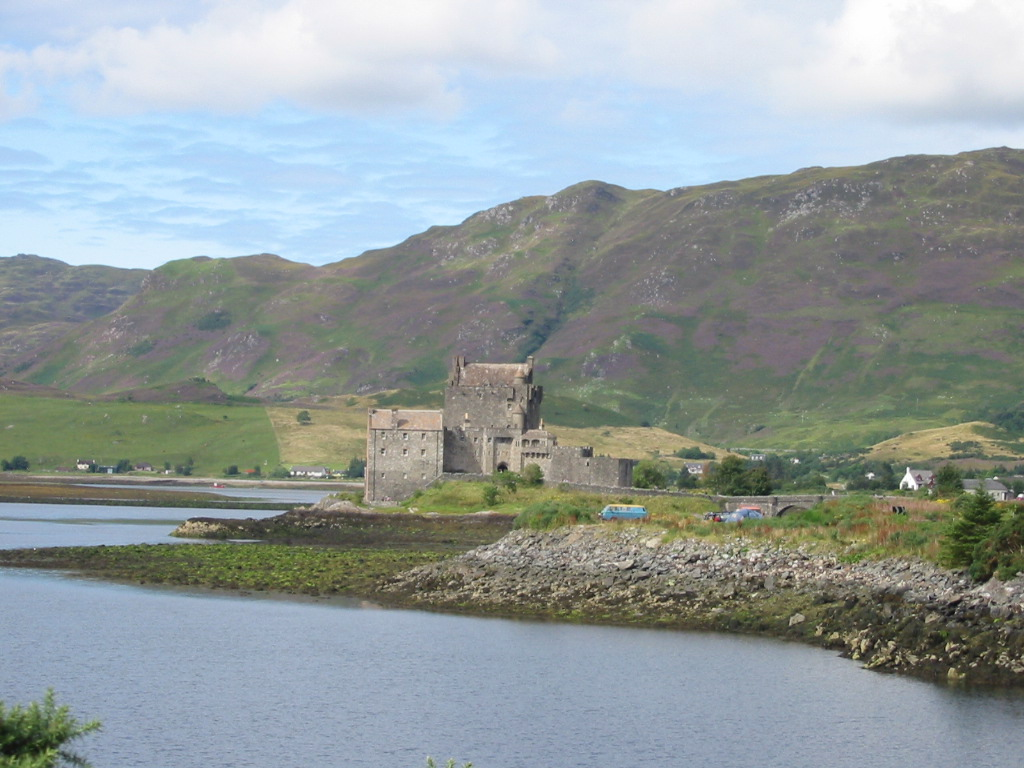
Eilean Donan Castle, in 2002

Alexander Macrae was of the opinion that these events probably took place sometime in the first half of the 14th century before the Mackenzies became firmly established in the Kintail area. He stated that there didn't appear to be any evidence that the Macraes were in the Kintail area before the time of these events, but noted that it was said that Eilean Donan Castle was garrisoned by Macraes and Maclennans in the late 13th century, during the period when the fortress was first taken into possession by Kenneth, founder of the Mackenzies of Kintail.

According to tradition, one of the prominent ancestors of the Macraes from Kintail was Fionnla Dubh mac Gillechriosd, According to John Macrae, Fionnla Dubh mac Gillechriosd was about two, or three, generations removed from the Macrae who settled in Kintail from Clunes. Alexander Macrae stated that Fionnla Dubh was a contemporary of Murdo Mackenzie, fifth chief of the Mackenzies of Kintail. In 1416, Murdo died and was succeeded by his son, Alexander.

According to the traditions of John Macrae, when the bastard uncles of the young Mackenzie chief began oppressing the folk of the district, Fionnla Dubh was instrumental in retrieving him from the south of Scotland; upon Alexander's return, the Mackenzie lands were brought back under control. The main line of the Macraes from Kintail, the Macraes of Inverinate, trace their descent from Fionnla Dubh.

== History ==
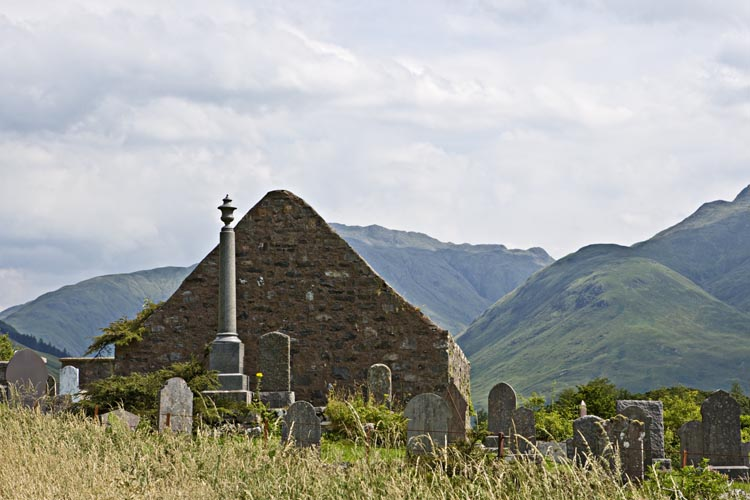
Clachan Duich Highland Church in ruins and burial ground of Clan Macrae

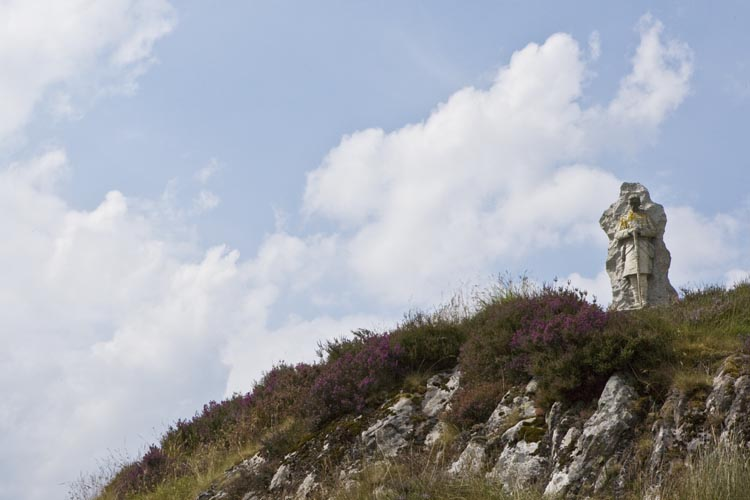
Great War Highlands Monument Clan Macrae

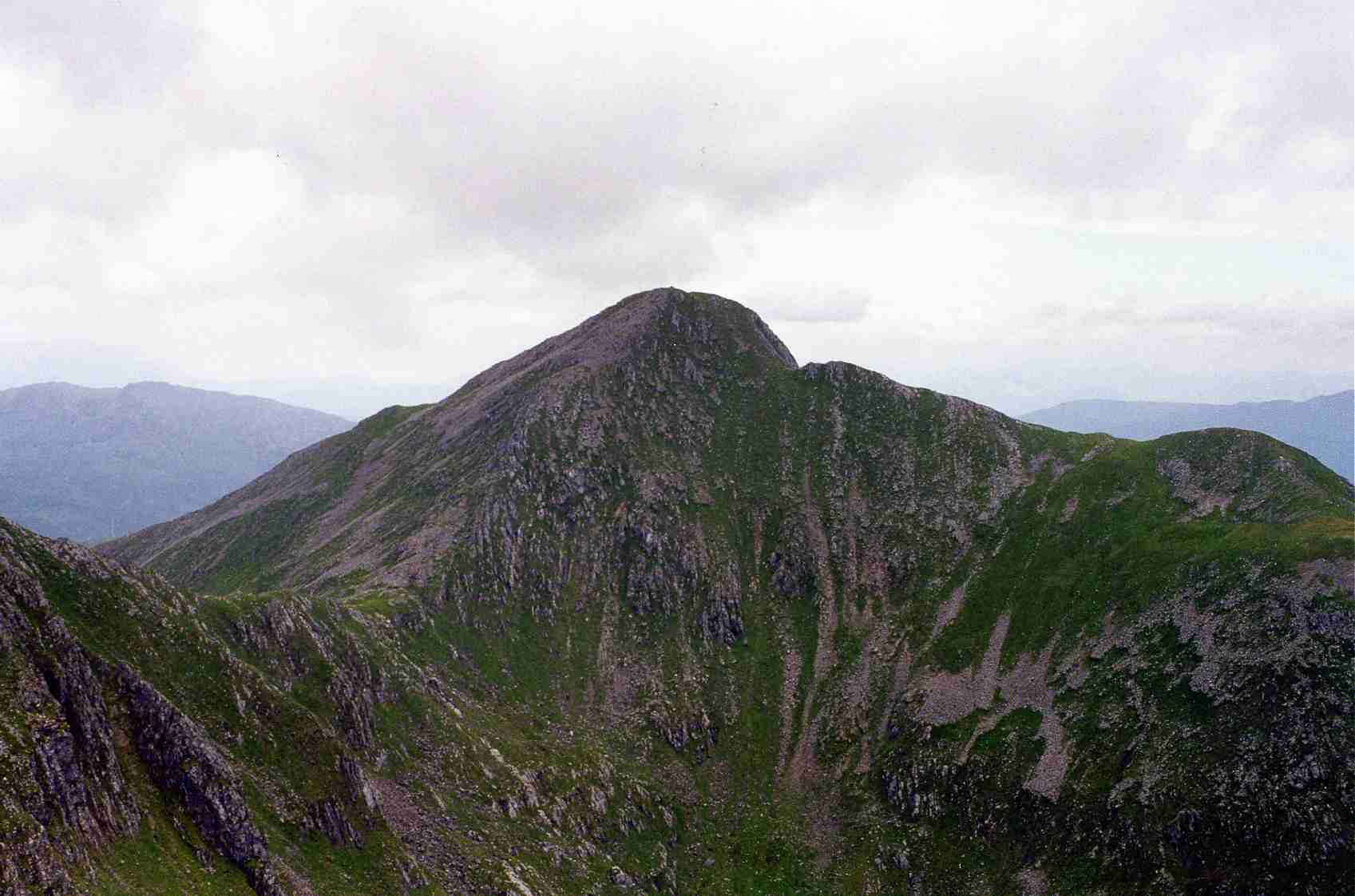
Sgùrr Fhuaran seen from Sgùrr na Ciste Dhuibhe

The Macraes are known to have been constant supporters of the Clan Mackenzie in recorded times; in 1520, and for many years onwards, they were constables of Eilean Donan Castle. In 1539 the Clan Macdonald of Sleat besieged Eilean Donan as part of their attempt to restore the Lordship of the Isles and Duncan Macrae is credited with slaying the Macdonald chief with an arrow which brought the siege to an end. In view of their constant service to the Mackenzies, the Macraes of Kintail became known as the Mackenzies' "shirt of mail".

=== 17th century and civil war ===
The Rev. Farquhar Macrae, born in 1580, Constable of Eilean Donan, was both an energetic churchman and a great Latin scholar. On his first visit to the Isle of Lewis, he is said to have baptised all the inhabitants under forty years of age, no clergyman having resided on the island during that period. His second son, John Macrae, became minister of Dingwall in 1640 and died in 1704.

During the Civil War the Clan Macrae supported the Royalist cause but under the equivocating Earl of Seaforth firstly fought valiantly on the losing Stateside at the Battle of Auldearn in May 1645 before following Seaforth to support the royalist James Graham, 1st Marquess of Montrose.

Rev. Farquhar Macrae's grandson, Duncan Macrae of Inverinate was the compiler of the famous Fernaig manuscript 1688-93.

=== Jacobite risings ===
In 1721 William Ross, 6th chief of the Pitcalnie line, his brother, Robert Ross, and a force of their clansmen tried to levy rents in the Clan Mackenzie lands, but were confronted by Colonel Donald Murchison and three hundred Mackenzies and Macraes. Both Walter Ross, the chief's son, and Robert's son, William, were wounded in the short Battle of Glen Affric, and the outnumbered Rosses parleyed and withdrew. Walter died of his wounds the next day.

In the Jacobite rising of 1745, the Macraes were divided. A number are known to have sided with the Jacobites under George Mackenzie, 3rd Earl of Cromartie, while others joined the government's Independent Highland Companies under Captain Colin Mackenzie In June 1746 the Mackenzie Company at Shiramore in Badenoch had over sixty Macraes, including an Ensign John MacRae.

=== American Revolution ===
At the outbreak of the American Revolution, many members of Clan Macrae who had settled along the Cape Fear River in the Colony of North Carolina, rose up and fought under the command of Brigadier General Donald MacDonald as Loyalists at the Battle of Moore's Creek Bridge. Among them was the war poet John MacRae, who has been termed one of the "earliest Scottish Gaelic poets in North America about whom we know anything."

MacRae was taken prisoner by Patriot militia following the Loyalist defeat. His son Murdo was mortally wounded.

Even though John MacRae is believed to have been killed either during or soon after the Battle of King's Mountain in 1780, his poems and songs celebrating the Loyalist cause remain an important part of Scottish Gaelic literature and are equally popular among speakers of Canadian Gaelic.

In more recent interviews with John Lorne Campbell, Barra seanchaidh John The Coddy MacPherson recalled that Clan Macrae of Kintail were famous throughout Scotland for cooking high quality moonshine, or "peatreek" in Scots, from illegal pot stills (Scottish Gaelic: poit dhubh).

== Symbols ==
Clan crests, clan badges, and clan tartans are means of identifying and displaying members' allegiance to their clan.

Macraes may wear on a bonnet or upon the chest either a badge of the Crest, A cubit arm grasping a sword, all proper. encircled by a strap with the Latin motto FORTITUDINE, meaning "with fortitude";, or the more authentic plant badge of a real sprig of club moss. sometimes referred to as staghorn grass. It may refer to the Mackenzie chief's arms, since the Macraes proudly admit no chief of their own but are closely associated with the Mackenzies.

The clan's war cry Sgurr Uaran refers to Sgùrr Fhuaran, a mountain near Loch Duich which is one of the "Five Sisters of Kintail", and a prominent rallying point in the clan's traditional lands.

"In Flanders Fields" was scribbled by a Canadian war poet of Scottish descent, Lieutenant-Colonel John McCrae, following the death of a close friend on the Western Front during the First World War. He threw it away, but one of his orderlies retrieved it for posterity.

A 2/4 March for bagpipes has been composed in honour of Clan Macrae.
