= Battle of Dornoch =

1746 battle

- Part of the Jacobite rising of 1745
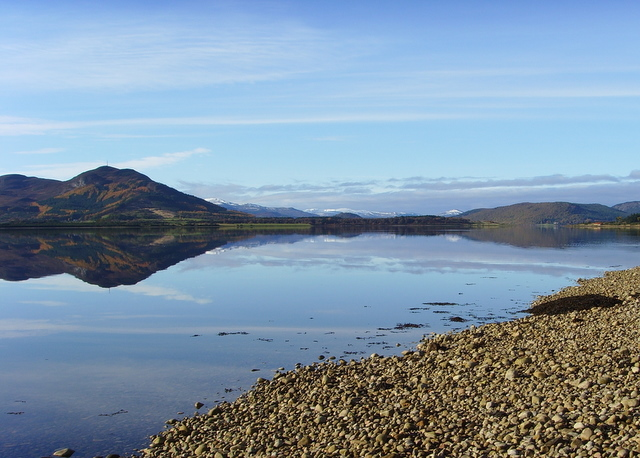
- The Dornoch Firth from Meikle Ferry
Date	20 – 21 March 1746
Location	Dornoch, Sutherland, Scotland
Result	Jacobite victory

Belligerents
(Kingdom of Great Britain) Government	Jacobites

Commanders and leaders
(Kingdom of Great Britain) Earl of Loudon (Kingdom of Great Britain) Lord Culloden (Kingdom of Great Britain) Norman MacLeod	Duke of Perth

Casualties and losses
According to historian Ruairidh MacLeod Government officers including the Laird of Mackintosh surrendered with about forty men. According to historian Peter Simpson 300 of Loudoun's regiment were taken prisoner. The rebels captured four ships at the Ferry as well as 700 arms that were meant for Loudoun's Regiment.	None

The Battle of Dornoch took place on 20 March 1746 and was part of the Jacobite rising of 1745 in Scotland. However, although recorded in history as a "battle" there was no actual fighting between the two sides. Instead a large rebel Jacobite force advanced on a position held by a force loyal to the British-Hanoverian Government who were taken by surprise and forced into a retreat. The Jacobite advance was coordinated by James Drummond, 3rd Duke of Perth at Dornoch, Sutherland.

== Background ==
Lord Loudoun (John Campbell, 4th Earl of Loudoun), supporter of the British-Hanoverian Government who was at Dornoch concluded that the Jacobites would attack from across the River Shin (which was West of his position) and that his eastern flank remained secured by the Royal Navy. This was despite warning to the contrary. He decided that the next morning he would ride up to a place called Invershin and he left Dornoch on 20 March between 7 and 8am.

== Rebel advance ==
At about 8 am the Jacobite Highlanders prepared to embark from the sands below Tain which is on the opposite side of the Dornoch Firth to Dornoch. One of the Jacobite commanders, Donald MacDonald of Lochgarry, later wrote that his men struggled all night to re-launch the boats that were stranded by the falling tide. The first division to embark consisted of about 500 men of the Clan Fraser of Lovat and 300 of the Clan Gregor. They landed at a place called Meikle Ferry at about 9 am and immediately marched towards Skibo Castle in an attempt to capture Duncan Forbes, Lord Culloden who was a staunch supporter of the government and who was Lord President of the Court of Session, and also Norman MacLeod, Laird of MacLeod. The alarm was raised at Dornoch and Lord Loudoun's Regiment known as Loudon's Highlanders beat to arms. Major Mackenzie of Loudoun's Regiment collected 120 men and proceeded down to the ferry where they arrived at about 10 am to find that 1500 rebels had landed. The rebel's second division which consisted of Lochgarry's regiment and also Clanranald's had already landed and the boats were going back for more men. The government-loyal Mackay guard at the boats only consisted of about 40 men and so they retired without firing a shot. Major Mackenzie of Lord Loudoun's regiment also retired without firing and the Jacobite Frasers marched off after them towards Dornoch. The rebel Jacobites had been lucky that the fog had persisted although Lochgarry claimed that it had begun to break up during the landing. The Jacobite rebels' third division consisting of George Mackenzie, 3rd Earl of Cromartie's regiment and the MacDonald of Barrisdale regiment landed at about 11 am. Lord Loudoun's regiment retired through Dornoch and Major Mackenzie sent the Laird of Mackintosh to ask under what terms they would be received as prisoners.

== Capture of Government forces ==
Captains Alexander Mackay, Sir Harry Munro, 7th Baronet, Lieutenant Reid and ensigns Alexander Maclaggan and John Grant made good their escape, along with Captain Lord Charles Gordon, Captain John MacLeod and Ensign James Grant of Glenmoriston, with some of the men. According to historian Ruairidh MacLeod, the remaining officers who were at Dornoch including the Laird of Mackintosh surrendered with about forty men. However, according to historian Peter Simpson, 300 of Loudoun's regiment were taken prisoner but the majority, 900 in all, escaped to the Isle of Skye. The rebels captured four ships at the ferry as well as 700 arms that were meant for Loudoun's Regiment. The rebel Jacobite Donald MacDonald of Lochgarry who had previously been commissioned as a lieutenant in Lord Loudoun's Regiment but had gone off with about £300 of Major Mackenzie's money and most of his company was present at the surrender.

== Retreat of remaining Government forces ==
Captain Alexander Mackay with about 160 men of Lord Loudoun's Regiment arrived about three miles from Lairg that evening. According to Ruairidh MacLeod, Lord Loudoun himself decided to abandon his position and divide his troops: The Mackay and Sutherland men (Independent Highland Companies) were to go north to Lord Reay's country, and this somewhat agrees with Tony Pollard's account that others of Loudoun's regiment escaped to the lands of the Mackays in the far north of Sutherland. MacLeod goes on to say that Lord Loudoun with his own regiment and the rest of the companies would go westwards. The rebels did not press their attack and on 21 March they rendezvoused west of Dornoch. On 22 March, the rebels marched off in pursuit of Lord Loudoun but found no one.

On 23 March, the rebels returned to Skibo and Dornoch and the Duke of Perth returned to Inverness. The Earl of Cromartie was left in command at Dornoch. By the 23 March Lord Loudoun had marched sixty miles to Loch Ewe and on 24 March had reached Eddracharron in Strathcarron where Kenneth Mackenzie, Lord Fortrose had a company in support of the Government. According to MacLeod, on 26 March Lord Loudoun arrived in Sleat where he would remain for a month. He had with him the Laird of MacLeod and his four companies, Sir Alexander MacDonald who joined with his two companies, George Munro, 1st of Culcairn's company, MacLeod of Geanies' company, the town of Inverness company and a few men of his own regiment commanded by Captain John Stuart, in total about 800 men. However, according to Simpson at Sleat they were reinforced by Alexander MacDonald of Sleat and the 3rd Mackenzie Independent Company, bringing their total number of men to 1300.

== Aftermath ==
On 25 March 1746, the 1st Mackay Independent Company under Captain George Mackay, 2nd Mackay Independent Company under Captain Hugh Mackay, one of the Sutherland Companies and some refugees of Loudon's Highlanders regiment had a notable success at the Skirmish of Tongue, where money and supplies destined for the Jacobite cause were captured from a French ship, and 156 Jacobites were taken prisoner. In response the Jacobite commander, Charles Edward Stuart, sent a large Jacobite force north under the command of George Mackenzie, 3rd Earl of Cromartie. However, they arrived too late to be of any use and were attacked by surprise by the 2nd Sutherland Company under the command of Ensign John Mackay and also the 2nd Mackay Company. This was known as the Battle of Littleferry where the Jacobite force was completely defeated, losing about 100 dead, and was prevented from providing much needed support to the Jacobites at the Battle of Culloden that took place the next day and which they would have been late for anyway.

== See also ==
- Jacobite risings
- Independent Highland Companies

== Bibliography ==
- Mackay, Angus, M.A (1906). The Book of Mackay. 25 George IV Bridge, Edinburgh: Norman MacLeod.
- MacLeod, Ruairidh. H. F.S.A. Scot (1984). Transactions of the Gaelic Society of Inverness. Vol. LIII.
- Pollard, Tony (2009). Culloden: The History and Archaeology of the last Clan Battle. South Yorkshire: Pen and Sword Books. ISBN 978-1-84884-020-1.
- Simpson, Peter (1996). The Independent Highland Companies, 1603 - 1760. Edinburgh: John Donald Publishers. ISBN 0-85976-432-X.
