= Sir Harry Munro, 7th Baronet =

Scottish soldier and politician

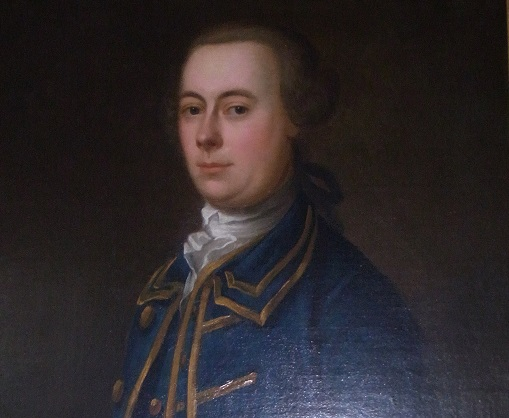
- Born: 1720
- Died: 1781 (aged 60–61); Edinburgh
- Relatives: Sir Robert Munro, 5th Baronet (grandfather); Sir Robert Munro, 6th Baronet (father); George Munro, 1st of Culcairn (uncle); Sir Hugh Munro, 8th Baronet (son)
- Military career
- Allegiance: British
- Rank: Captain
- Unit: Loudon's Highlanders
- Conflicts: Battle of Prestonpans; Skirmish of Tongue
- Other work: Member of Parliament

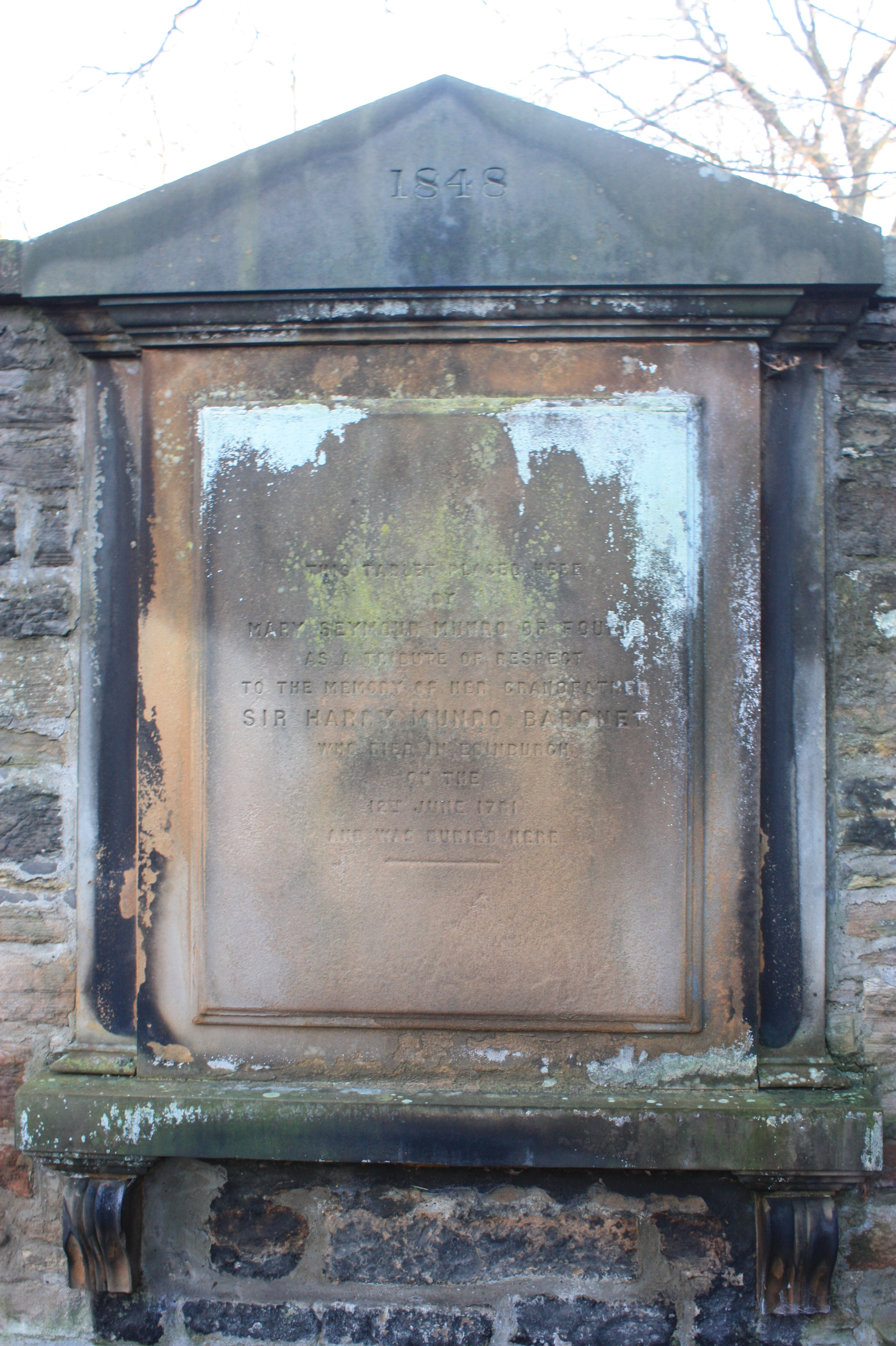
The grave of Sir Harry Munro, Greyfriars Kirkyard

Sir Harry Munro, 7th Baronet (c. 1720 – 12 June 1781) was 25th Baron and the 28th chief of the Clan Munro. He was a Scottish soldier and politician. He was loyal to the Hanoverian dynasty and served as a captain in Loudon's Highlanders Regiment 1745–48.

== Early life ==
Harry Munro was the second surviving son of Sir Robert Munro, 6th Baronet and Mary, daughter of Henry Seymour of Woodlands. His elder brother Robert died during his infancy. His uncle was George Munro, 1st of Culcairn.

== Early military career ==
Sir Harry's military career seems to have started when he was among nine young gentlemen, who were appointed Ensigns in Bisset's 30th Regiment of Foot in May 1742. In June 1745 he was appointed on the recommendation of Lord Stair and Henry Pelham as one of the company commanders in a new Highland Regiment being raised by John Campbell, 4th Earl of Loudoun.

== Jacobite rising of 1745 - 1746 ==
Harry Munro's company was one of three in the process of being raised in the North when the Commander in Chief in Scotland, General Sir John Cope arrived at Inverness on 29 August. Harry's uncle George Munro, 1st of Culcairn met Sir John Cope and agreed that the Munros "should instantly take arms and join the King's troops" and the next day Harry brought in 200 of his men in three companies. These three companies were raised by Harry Munro himself, Hugh Munro of Teaninich and William Munro of Achany.

Harry joined Sir John Cope at the Water of Nairn and when the army marched for Aberdeen on 4 September Loudon's Highlanders regiment included his three companies, while George Munro of Culcairn's detachment acted as scouts. Sir John Cope remained in Aberdeen where a fourth company of Loudoun's regiment joined the others until 14 September from where they sailed to Dunbar and had their infamous defeat at the Battle of Prestonpans. Harry was among 70 officers taken prisoner and for a time was imprisoned in Glamis Castle but by mid January 1746 he was among 31 men released who arrived at Edinburgh, where he learnt the news of the deaths of his father Robert and his uncle Duncan after the Battle of Falkirk (1746).

Meanwhile, the main body of Munros having escorted Sir John Cope successfully to Aberdeen had returned to the north under George Munro, 1st of Culcairn and were not present at Prestonpans.

John Campbell, 4th Earl of Loudoun and Sir John Cope had escaped by sea to London after the Battle of Prestonpans from whence Loudoun later returned north to Inverness to take command in the north but was forced with the Lord President Forbes and George Munro of Culcairn to withdraw through the Black Isle into Ross-shire being pressed by a much larger Jacobite force.

The commander of British forces, Prince William, Duke of Cumberland, had no wish to have the support of any Highland troops at the time for he distrusted them all and deliberately gave the Earl of Loudoun no help to extricate himself from his difficulties with the Jacobites in the north. Harry Munro was with George Mackay of Skibo, son of George Mackay, 3rd Lord Reay, at the Skirmish of Tongue in March 1746 where they defeated a Jacobite force and captured money and supplies that were meant for the Jacobite leader Charles Edward Stuart.

Three other companies of Loudoun's regiment raised in Argyll from the Clan Campbell came under the Duke of Cumberland's command in his march north from Stirling but they were used mainly as scouts and baggage guards. However, several of them, including one officer were killed when they fought at the Battle of Culloden. Loudon's Highlanders Regiment was at Culloden but Harry Munro himself was listed as absent "by HRH leave" presumably to try to deal with the problems at Foulis Castle which had been burned after the Battle of Falkirk.

At the request of Simon Fraser, 11th Lord Lovat, Harry Munro of Foulis and Ludovick Grant of Grant visited Lovat while he was imprisoned in the Tower of London having received the death sentence.

After the suppression of the rebellion, Loudon's Highlanders later took part in the mopping up operations based at Fort Augustus. The regiment remained in Scotland until May 1747 when they embarked at Bruntisland to join the allied army under Cumberland in Flanders.

The Munro company under Harry appears to have stayed in Scotland but in a letter from another officer in March 1748, Sir Harry is said to be going over to join the regiment. However, with the ending of the war in Flanders, Loudon's regiment was ordered back to Scotland and reduced at Perth in June of that year.

== Member of Parliament ==
In politics Harry Munro was a supporter of the Duke of Newcastle, a prominent Whig who was Prime Minister 1754 - 1756 and 1757 - 1762. Harry Munro also served as MP for Ross-shire 11 December 1746 - 1747 and for Tain Burghs 1747 - 1761.

== Family ==
Harry married Anne, daughter of Hugh Rose of Kilravock, chief of the Clan Rose. Harry was succeeded by his son Sir Hugh Munro, 8th Baronet of Foulis.

He is buried in Greyfriars Kirkyard in the centre of Edinburgh. The grave lies on the north side of a vault in an obscured location north-west of the Adam mausoleum.

== Independent Highland Company ==
The Independent Highland Companies that were raised by Lord Loudoun in 1745-46 were not regimented until 1747 and therefore they are often confused with the eighteen Independent Highland Companies that were raised by Duncan Forbes of Culloden. The Loudoun Papers are held in the Huntington Library in San Marino, California and include four lists of the soldiers under Sir Harry Munro in the company raised for Lord Loudoun dated September 17, 1746, November 18, 1746, January 12, 1748, and January 16, 1748. The first of these being five months after the Jacobite rising was effectively ended at the Battle of Culloden in April 1746, and Sir Harry Munro's three companies having been reduced to just one company. The following two lists are the soldiers who were in Sir Harry Munro's company on September 17, 1746, and on November 18, 1746.

List of soldiers in Sir Harry Munro's company on September 17, 1746

Christian name	Surname
William	Clerk (Sergeant)
Robert	Ross (Sergeant)
John	Aird (Sergeant)
Alexander	Campbell (Sergeant)
William	Campbell (Sergeant)
John	Munro (Corporal)
William	Maclean (Corporal)
Hugh	McDonald (Drum)
William	Munro (Donaldson)
Donald	Munro (Donaldson)
William	Campbell
Walter	Calder
Duncan	Campbell
Alexander	Campbell
John	Cameron
John	Dougless
Donald	Fraser
Hugh	Fraser
Alexander	Fraser
Adam	Gray
Angus	Glen
Thomas	Gair
Archibald	Gilleis
Thomas	Hendrie
Andrew	Keith
John	MacDonald
Roderick	McDonald
Murdow	McDonald
Donald	McLeod
John	McLeod
John	McLeod
Donald	Mackay
John	Mackay
Alexander	Macley
Alexander	Maclean
Archd	McLachlan
Alexander	McIntire
Malcolm	McIntire
Alexander	McCallum
Donald	McCrum
John	McIntire
David	Mackenzie
James	Mackenzie
Hugh	Munro Grigerson
John	Manson
Donald	Munro (Ferintosh)
Donald	Munro (Breach)
Donald	Munro (McAlister)
Hugh	Munro (in Glens)
John	Munro (Obsdale)
Andrew	Munro (Bayne)
Donald	Munro (Roy)
Donald	Munro (Miller)
James	Munro (McCoins)
William	Munro (Ferintosh)
Alexander	Munro (Miller)
Robert	Munro
William	Munro (Caravaky)
John	Munro (Nafeid)
John	Munro (Taylor)
John	Munro (McEarneray)
William	Munro (Hectorson)
John	Munro (Miller)
David	Munro (Taylor)
Hugh	Munro (Ferintosh)
William	Munro (Kincraig)
John	Munro (Teaninich)
John	Murray
Angus	Muet
William	Reid
David	Ross (Elder)
David	Ross (Younger)
George	Ross
Neile	Ross
Alexander	Ross (Elder)
Alexander	Ross (Younger)
James	Ross (Elder)
James	Ross (Younger)
David	Ross (Donaldson)
William	Sutherland
Robert	McLeod (volunteer)
Andrew	Munro (volunteer)
Alexander	Munro (volunteer)

List of soldiers in Sir Harry Munro's company on November 18, 1746

Christian name	Surname	Where entertained	Shire where born	Parish where born	Age	Height in feet and inches	Colour of hair
John	Aird (Sergeant)	August 1, 1745	Ross	Rosskeen			Fair
Robert	Ross (Sergeant)	August 6, 1745	Ross	Kiltearn			Brown
Walter	Calder	August 6, 1745	Ross	Tarbat	23	5 5 1/2	Brown
Alexr	Campbell	July 17, 1746	Argyll	Ardnamurchan	19	5 4 3/4	Fair
Duncan	Campbell	November 10, 1745	Argyll	Glen Orchy	16	5 3 1/2	Brown
William	Campbell	August 19, 1746	Caithness	Thurso			Brown
William	Campbell	August 15, 1746	Caithness	Reay			Brown
John	Cameron	August 1, 1746	Perth	Fortingall			Red
Alexander	Fraser	August 6, 1745	Ross	Kilmuir	24	5 5 1/2	Brown
Hugh	Fraser	August 6, 1745	Ross	Alness	20	5 6	Fair
Adam	Gray	August 6, 1745	Ross	Kirkmichael			Black
Angus	Gun	August 6, 1746	Sutherland	Kildonan	25	5 6 3/4	Brown
Thomas	Gair	August 6, 1745	Ross	Nigg	33	5 7	Fair
Thomas	Henderson	August 6, 1745	Ross	Tain	30	5 7 1/2	Black
John	Douglas	August 20, 1746	Caithness	Thurso			Black
Archibald	McDonald	November 1, 1746	Inverness		30	5 3	Black
John	McDonald	August 21, 1746	Caithness	Canisbay	17	5 4 1/2	Fair
Roderick	McDonald	August 6, 1745	Sutherland	Creich			Fair
Donald	Mckay	August 6, 1745	Ross	Kiltearn			Black
Donald	Mckenzie	November 1, 1746					Black
Donald	Mcleod	September 10, 1746	Caithness	Reay	19	5 5	Black
John	Mcleod	November 10, 1746	Sutherland	Creich	30	5 6 3/4	Black
John	Mcleod	November 10, 1746	Caithness				Black
Murdoch	Mcleod	November 10, 1746	Perth	Fortingall			Black
Donald	McCruim	August 1, 1746	Argyll	Kilbride	32	5 8	Brown
Hugh	McGrigor (Hugh Munro Grigorson)	July 20, 1746	Caithness	Latheron			Brown
Robert	Mcleod	August 6, 1745	Ross	Lochcarron			Fair
Alexr	Mclea	August 6, 1745	Ross	Kincardine			Fair
Alexander	Mclean	August 6, 1745	Ross	Roskeen	23	5 7 1/2	Fair
Alexr	McIver	September 20, 1746	Inverness	Obertarf	30	5 7	Brown
Alexander	McIntyre	August 1, 1745			27	5 6 1/2	Fair
John	McIntyre	August 1, 1745			27	5 6 1/2	Fair
James	Mckenzie	July 14, 1746	Ross	Alness	20	5 5	Brown
Donald	McSunie	November 10, 1746	Inverness				Black
Cathilus	McPherson	November 18, 1746					
William	Mclean (Corporal)	August 6, 1745	Sutherland	Creich			Black
John	Munro (Corporal)	August 6, 1745	Ross	Rosskeen			Brown
Hugh	MacDonald (Drum)	May 20, 1746	Ross	Roskeen			Fair
John	Manson	August 14, 1746	Ross	Rosskeen			Fair
Angus	Muat	September 10, 1746	Caithness	Latheron			Fair
John	Murray	September 10, 1746	Caithness	Thurso	30	4 5 1/4	Fair
Alexr	Munro (Miller)	March 6, 1746	Sutherland	Golspie			Fair
Andrew	Munro (Bayne)	August 6, 1745	Ross	Kiltearn			Black
Andrew	Munro	September 10, 1746	Ross	Tain	26	5 7	Brown
Donald	Munro (Donaldson)	August 6, 1746	Ross	Tarbat	23	5 7	Black
Donald	Munro (Mcalister)	June 4, 1746	Ross	Urquhart			Fair
Donald	Munro (Roy)	August 14, 1745	Ross	Urquhart	23	5 5 1/2	Brown
Donald	Munro (Miller)	August 6, 1745	Ross	Kiltearn	20	5 5 1/2	Fair
John	Munro (Nafeid)	September 12, 1745	Ross	Kilteran	20	5 6 1/4	Black
John	Munro (Taylor)	August 6, 1745	Ross	Kiltearn	30	5 4 1/4	Black
John	Munro (McEarney)	August 16, 1746	Ross	Rosskeen			Black
John	Munro (Miller)	August 17, 1746	Ross	Rosskeen			Black
William	Munro (Donaldson)	August 6, 1745	Ross	Kiltearn	23	5 6 1/2	Black
William	Munro (Ferintosh)	August 6, 1745	Ross	Urquhart	23	5 6	Black
William	Munro (Caravaky)	August 16, 1746	Ross	Kiltearn	28	5 3 3/4	Brown
William	Munro (Hectorson)	August 13, 1746	Ross	Rosskeen			Brown
William	Munro (Kincraig)	November 18, 1746	Ross		20	5 6	
Alexander	Ross (Elder)	August 6, 1745	Ross	Kincardine	34	5 5 3/4	
Alexr	Ross (younger)	August 6, 1745	Ross	Kincardine	20	5 5 3/4	Fair
David	Ross (Elder)	August 6, 1745	Ross	Kincardine			Black
David	Ross (Younger)	August 6, 1745	Ross	Kincardine	19	5 7	Brown
David	Ross	August 6, 1745	Sutherland	Creich			Black
George	Ross	May 20, 1746	Ross	Fearn	20	5 7	Black
James	Ross (Elder)	August 6, 1745	Ross	Fearn			Brown
James	Ross (Younger)	August 6, 1745	Ross	Tarbat			Brown
Neil	Ross	August 6, 1745	Ross	Kincardine	46	5 6 1/2	Brown
William	Reid	August 6, 1745	Ross	Kiltearn	26	5 5	Black
William	Sutherland	August 6, 1745	Ross	Kiltearn	32	5 3 1/2	Brown
Hugh	Munro (In Glens)	June 10, 1746	Ross	Urquhart			Brown
James	Munro (McCoins)	August 6, 1745	Ross	Kiltearn	28	5 8	Black
Malcolm	McDonald	October 20, 1746	Inverness	Obertarf	21	5 4 1/2	Black
Murdoch	McDonald	August 6, 1745	Sutherland	Eddrachillis	35	5 4 1/2	Black
John	Mckay				46	5 8	Black

== See also ==
- Munro Baronets
- Clan Munro
- Scottish clan

Parliament of Great Britain
Preceded by Charles Ross	Member of Parliament for Ross-shire; 1746–1747	Succeeded by Kenneth Mackenzie, Lord Fortrose
Preceded by Robert Craigie	Member of Parliament for Tain Burghs; 1747–1761	Succeeded by John Scott
Baronetage of Nova Scotia
Preceded by Robert Munro	Baronet (of Foulis); 1746–1781	Succeeded by Hugh Munro
