= Hugh Mackay of Bighouse =

Scottish noble and soldier

Hugh Mackay of Bighouse was a Scottish noble, soldier and a member of the Clan Mackay, a Scottish clan of the Scottish Highlands.

== Early life ==
Hugh Mackay was the eldest son from the second marriage of his father, George Mackay, 3rd Lord Reay to Janet, daughter of John Sinclair of Ulbster, Caithness.

== Military career ==
During the Jacobite rising of 1745 Hugh Mackay supported the British-Hanoverian Government and was Captain of the 2nd Mackay Independent Highland Company that fought at the Skirmish of Tongue on 25 March 1746, where money and supplies were captured from a French ship, and 156 Jacobites were taken prisoner. He also led his Independent Company at the Battle of Littleferry on 15 April 1746 where the Jacobites were again completely defeated. His Independent Company was also involved in the Raids on Lochaber and Shiramore. Later he was Lieutenant-Colonel of the 1st Sutherland Regiment.

== Family ==
Hugh Mackay married in 1728 to Elizabeth, eldest daughter and co-heiress of George Mackay of Bighouse (and this is from where Hugh took his designation) and had sasine of the Bighouse Estate in Strathhallade on 28 February 1742. Hugh Mackay of Bighouse married secondly Isabella, daughter of Alexander Mackenzie of Lentran but this marriage produced no children. From his first marriage to Elizabeth Mackay he had the following children:

1. Hugh Mackay "younger of Bighouse" who was Lieutenant in Captain George Mackay of Skibo’s Independent Highland Company.
2. Colin Mackay who died in infancy.
3. Janet Mackay who married Colin Campbell of Glenure who was murdered in 1752 in what is known as the Appin Murder.
4. Mary Mackay who married William Ballie of Rosehall and died in 1808.
5. Marion Mackay who married George Mackay, 5th Lord Reay
6. Robina Mackay who died unmarried at Harrogate in 1762.

== Independent Company ==
The names of the men in Hugh Mackay of Bighouse's Independent Highland Company during the Jacobite rising of 1745 were:

- John Mckay (Lieutenant)
- Aneas Mckay (Ensign)
- Robt Mckay (Sergeant)
- John Mckay (Sergeant)
- George Monro (Sergeant)
- James Mckay (Sergeant)
- Hugh Mckay (Corporal)
- Donald Mckay (Corporal)
- Donald Mckay (Corporal)
- William Morison (Corporal)
- John McDonald (Pyper)
- Angus Mckay (Drum)
- John Mckay (centinel) (in Strathmelness)
- Angus Gun (centinel) (in Craigtown)
- Hugh Mckay (centinel) (in Bighouse)
- Hugh Mckay Taylor (centinel)
- Angus Hossack (centinel)
- Hugh McLeod (centinel) (in Torr)
- Donald Mckay (centinel) (in Sartigrim)
- Hugh Mckay (centinel) (in Trantle)
- Charles Montgumerie (centinel)
- John Mckay (centinel) (in Forsinard)
- Angus Mckay (centinel) (in Durness)
- John McLeod yr (centinel)
- Robert Morison (centinel) (in Oldshoar)
- Hugh Gun (centinel) (in Sculomy)
- John McKenzie (centinel) (in Portchamile)
- Hugh Mckay (centinel) (in Breckruw)
- Donald Mcpherson (centinel) (in Dalhalow)
- Donald Fraser (centinel)
- Alexr McCoull (centinel) (in Forsinain)
- Robert Campbell (centinel) (in Islandhoan)
- James McLeod (centinel) (in Coull)
- Robert Grange (centinel) (in Durness)
- Will Bain (centinel) (in Sandego)
- Geo MacKenzie (centinel) (in Kirkiboll)
- Joseph McCoull (centinel)
- Will Edie (centinel)
- John Gun (centinel) (in Skinit)
- Hugh Mckay (centinel) (in Forsinaird)
- Will Gun (centinel) (in Forsinain)
- John Mckay (centinel) (in Kergarybeg)
- George Gow (centinel) (in Halladale)
- Donald Mckay (centinel) (in Hevagmore)
- Robert McLeod (centinel) (in coull)
- George Mckay (centinel) (in Forsinaird)
- Will McLeod (centinel) (in Knockbreck)
- Angus Gun (centinel) (in Skinit)
- Angus Mckay (centinel) (in Coull)
- Angus Mckay (centinel) (in Craigie)
- Geo Mckay yr (centinel)
- Donald Mckay (centinel) (in Forsinaird)
- Jno McCoull (centinel) (in Dispolly)
- Angus McLeod (centinel) (in Hope)
- Will Mckay (centinel) (in Ribigill)
- Donald Gun (centinel) (in Sandego)
- Niel Morison (centinel)
- Rory McLeod (centinel)
- Will Gun (centinel) (deserted from Inverness and hanged)
- John Gow (centinel) (in Torr)
- John Mckay (centinel) (in Catechist)
- Robert Mckay (centinel) (in Torisdale)
- Hector Morison (centinel) (in Tarbert)
- Patr Morison yr (centinel)
- Hu Morison (centinel) (in Kylestrome)
- Hugh McLeod (centinel) (in Tongue)
- John Bain (centinel) (in Golvell)
- John Mckay (centinel) (in Melness)
- John McLeod (centinel) (in Kirktown)
- Joseph Mckay (centinel) (in Nair)
- John Mckay (centinel) (in Tongue)
- Alexr McCoull (centinel) (in Corkall)
- Dond Gun (centinel) (in Cargary)
- Dond Sinclair (centinel)
- Geo Mckay (centinel) (in Torisdale)
- Will Hossack (centinel)
- Dond Ross (centinel) (in Despolie)
- Dond McLeod (centinel) (in Kergary)
- Dond Mckay (centinel) (in Hope)
- Alexr Monro (centinel)
- John Mckay (centinel) (in Melvich)
- Geo Campbell (centinel) (in Knockdow)
- John McCoull (centinel) (in Corkall)
- Geo Sinclair (centinel) (in Dalhalva)
- Gilbert Down (centinel)
- Donald Mckay (centinel) (in Islandroan)
- Hugh Mckay (centinel) (in Scoury)
- Hugh McPherson (centinel)
- Neil Mckay (centinel) (in Niubeg, Durness)
- George McIntosh (centinel)
- John Monro (mason) (centinel)
- John Monro (centinel) (in Strath)
- Will Buie (Buy) (centinel)
- John Mckay (centinel) (in Sartigrim)
- Will McLeod (centinel) (in Torr)
- John Gow (centinel) (in Dalhabaoy) (Dalava)
- Will Mckay (centinel) (in Knockdow)
- Hu Sinclair (centinel) (in Achervorldevin)
- Angus Mckay (centinel) (in Skinit)
- Geo Mckay (centinel) (in Tongue)
- John Mckay (centinel) (in Mussoll)
- Hu McIntosh (centinel) (in Reroy)
- John Sutherland (centinel) (in Skinit)
- Hu McKenzie (centinel)
- Hector McKenzie (centinel)
- David McLeod (centinel) (in Oldshoar)
- Niel McCoul (Tailer) (centinel)
- Hugh Morison (centinel) (in Gisgill)
- Hu Gow (centinel)
- John Monro (centinel) (in Culcairn)
- Dond Mckay (centinel)
- Hugh McLeod (centinel)
- Will Mckay (centinel) (in Breckrue)
- James Mckay (centinel) (in Erriboll)
- Murdoch McIntosh (centinel)
- Alexr Sutherland (centinel)
- Alexr Morgan (centinel)
- John Gun (centinel)

== Bibliography ==
- Mackay, Angus. M. A. (1906). Book of Mackay. St Andrews University.
- MacLeod, Ruairidh. F.S.A. Scot. (1984). Transactions of the Gaelic Society of Inverness. Volume LIII.
- Simpson, Peter. (1996). The Independent Highland Companies, 1603 - 1760. ISBN 0-85976-432-X.
