= George Mackay, 3rd Lord Reay =

Scottish noble and chief of the Clan Mackay

George Mackay, 3rd Lord Reay (1678–1748), was a Scottish noble and chief of the Clan Mackay, a Scottish clan of the Scottish Highlands. During his life the Glorious Revolution took place which directly affected his family and estate, and during his chiefdom he served the British-Hanoverian Government during the Jacobite rising of 1715 and the Jacobite rising of 1745.

== Early life ==
George Mackay, 3rd Lord Reay, was the only son of Donald Mackay, Master of Reay, and his wife Ann, daughter of Sir George Munro of Culrain (of Newmore). The Master of Reay was killed in an accident in 1680 when a barrel of gunpowder exploded whilst hunting in the Reay Forest, and his father, John Mackay, 2nd Lord Reay, died not long after. George Mackay, 3rd Lord Reay, therefore succeeded his grandfather, the 2nd Lord Reay.

== The Glorious Revolution ==
The period of 1680–1688 was of growing religious persecution in Scotland with the House of Stuart steering for political perdition. Charles II of England died in 1685 and was succeeded by his brother James II of England and VII of Scotland. James roused the Scots Covenanters to desperation and also alienated himself from many of the Cavalier families, until finally in 1688 the Stuarts were overthrown in the Glorious Revolution and replaced by William of Orange. The Mackay's lands of Strathnaver had offered asylum to persecuted Covenanters and John Mackay, 7th of Aberach, chieftain of the Mackay of Aberach branch of the clan had also supported the Covenanters.

=== Jacobite rising of 1689 ===
A Jacobite rising broke out in 1689 in support of the exiled Stuarts and a Mackay clansman, General Hugh Mackay of Scoury was appointed by William of Orange as Commander-in-Chief of the forces in Scotland. Hugh Mackay was defeated by the Jacobites at the Battle of Killiecrankie although the Jacobite leader John Graham, 1st Viscount Dundee, was killed in the battle. This Jacobite rising was ultimately defeated at the Battle of Dunkeld and the Battle of Cromdale the following year in 1690. General Hugh Mackay went on to support William of Orange during the Williamite War in Ireland and was killed at the Battle of Steenkerque in Belgium in 1692. In 1693 or 1694, shortly after the death of his grandfather Sir George Munro of Culrain, the young George Mackay, 3rd Lord Reay, travelled over to Holland where his two uncles Aneas and Robert Mackay were on service as Lieutenant-General and Colonel. One of these uncles died in 1696 and the other in 1697. According to historian Angus Mackay at this time a strong stream of Strathnaver men (Mackays) flowed abroad as soldiers of fortune and some were on the ill-fated Darien scheme.

In December 1702 George Mackay, 3rd Lord Reay, entered into a contract of marriage with Margaret, daughter of General Hugh Mackay of Scoury. Lord Reay then received the estates of Eddrachilis and Scoury as the dowry which were a large and valuable addition to the Reay Estate.

== Jacobite rising of 1715 ==
In 1714, Anne, Queen of Great Britain, died leaving no issue and the crown once more passed to a foreign-born descendant of the Scottish kings, George I of Great Britain who was from the House of Hanover and who was a grandson of James VI of Scotland and I of England. The Jacobite rising of 1715 broke out in favour of the exiled James Francis Edward Stuart who was proclaimed James VIII by his supporters. The rising was led by the Jacobite John Erskine, 6th Earl of Mar. John Gordon, 16th Earl of Sutherland, supporter of the British-Hanoverian Government had received a commission as the king's Lieutenant and arrived by boat from London at his seat Dunrobin Castle on 28 September 1715. A week later he set out from Dunrobin with 400 of his tenants to Tain where he found George Mackay, 3rd Lord Reay, with 500 Mackays and 200 Rosses waiting in support of him. At Alness they were also joined by the Munros and had obtained six small canons. At Alness, Sutherland's combined force numbered 1800 men. However, the advancing Jacobite force under William Mackenzie, 5th Earl of Seaforth, consisted of 3000 men. In what is now known as the Skirmish of Alness, the Earl of Sutherland and Lord Reay retreated back over Bonar Bridge into Sutherland. After this the Earl of Seaforth and his force joined up with that of the Earl of Mar, but the Jacobite rising ended in failure at the indecisive Battle of Sheriffmuir on 14 November 1715. On the same day other Jacobites under Mackenzie of Coul were defeated at the Siege of Inverness (1715). Meanwhile, the Earl of Seaforth sped back towards Inverness from Sheriffmuir. However, Inverness having fallen, 200 Sutherlands, 150 Mackays, 300 Grants, 150 Munros and 50 Forbes of Culloden set out to give Seaforth battle, but he avoided them making his way back to Brahan Castle while his pursuers halted at Fraser of Lovat's Castle Downie until the Earl of Sutherland arrived with more troops. The Earl of Seaforth then escaped to the Isle of Lewis and from there to exile in France along with other Jacobites including the Earl of Mar.

== Jacobite rising of 1719 ==
In 1718, a war broke out between Britain and Spain and the Jacobites of Clan Macdonald of Clanranald, Clan Cameron of Lochiel, Clan Mackinnon, Clan Chisholm, as well as the Earl of Seaforth were joined by a Spanish division who had landed in the west of Ross-shire towards the end of April 1719. At the Battle of Glen Shiel the Mackays under Ensign Hugh Mackay and Sutherlands who together supported the Government were posted on the right wing and the Jacobites were defeated.

Also in 1719, George Mackay, 3rd Lord Reay, who was an elder in the Kirk applied to the General Assembly of the Church of Scotland to furnish his people with clergyman and school masters, and his proposal included dividing the large parish of Durness into three parishes: Tongue, Durness, and Ederachilis, each of which would be provided with a minister and school master. In 1725 the General Assembly accepted his proposals.

== Jacobite rising of 1745 ==
Between 1741 and 1744 political warfare raged between Mackay, Lord Reay, and the Earl of Sutherland. This had started in 1737 in a dispute over estates which was submitted to arbitration but then the arrangement broke down. However, when the Jacobite rising of 1745 broke out George Mackay, 3rd Lord Reay, realized the necessity of united action by those who were friendly to the existing Government. A bond of friendship was then arranged by Lord Reay between him and Sutherland. At the request of Duncan Forbes, Lord Culloden, Lord Reay, Sutherland, Grant, Seaforth and Munro sent levies of troops to Inverness to join John Campbell, 4th Earl of Loudoun, who was a supporter of the Government and who had assumed command of any troops that could be gathered together. George Mackenzie, 3rd Earl of Cromartie, was a Jacobite rebel, as was his son John Mackenzie, Lord MacLeod (not to be confused with the Laird of MacLeod, who supported the Government at this time). According to Angus Mackay, while Lord MacLeod was at Thurso, Caithness, where there was a Jacobite meeting house until after the Battle of Culloden he was joined by the men of Loch Broom under the brother of Mackenzie of Ballone. Lord MacLeod then made an attempt to invade the Mackay lands of Strathnaver but finding that the Mackays were prepared to contest their passage, backed down. The opposing force of Mackays was probably under the command of Hugh Mackay of Bighouse, son of Lord Reay. On 25 March 1746 Lord Reay's son, Captain George Mackay of Skibo led a contingent of Mackays at the Skirmish of Tongue, where money and supplies destined for the Jacobite cause were captured from a French ship, and 156 Jacobites were taken prisoner. In response the Jacobite commander, Charles Edward Stuart, sent a large Jacobite force north under the command of George Mackenzie, 3rd Earl of Cromartie. However, they arrived too late to be of any use and were attacked by surprise by the 2nd Sutherland Company under the command of Ensign John Mackay and also the 2nd Mackay Company. This was known as the Battle of Littleferry where the Jacobite force was completely defeated, losing about 100 dead, and was prevented from providing much needed support to the Jacobites at the Battle of Culloden that took place the next day and which they would have been late for anyway.

George Mackay, 3rd Lord Reay, then travelled to Leith on the ship named The Sheerness, which had pursued the Jacobites in the Skirmish of Tongue, and remained in the south until the following autumn. In a letter to a government official dated 2 September 1746, Lord Reay suggested the need to erect new churches and to spread the Gospel among the disaffected. George Mackay, 3rd Lord Reay, was a Fellow of the Royal Society. He died at Tongue on 21 March 1746.

== Family ==
George Mackay, 3rd Lord Reay, had married firstly, Margaret, daughter of General Hugh Mackay of Scoury, and had one son:

1. Donald Mackay, 4th Lord Reay.

George Mackay, 3rd Lord Reay, married secondly, Janet, daughter of John Sinclair of Ulbster, Caithness, and had the following children:

1. Hugh Mackay of Bighouse, Captain of an Independent Highland Company that supported the Government during the Jacobite rising of 1745.
2. Ann Mackay

George Mackay, 3rd Lord Reay, married thirdly, Mary, daughter of John Dowell, W.S. Edinburgh, and had the following children:

1. George Mackay of Skibo, Captain of an Independent Highland Company that supported the Government during the Jacobite rising of 1745.
2. Alexander Mackay, Captain in Loudon's Highlanders regiment that supported the Government during the Jacobite rising of 1745.
3. Mary Mackay
4. Harriet Mackay
5. Christian Mackay
6. Marion Mackay

== Bibliography ==
- Mackay, Angus, M.A (1906). The Book of Mackay. 25 George IV Bridge, Edinburgh: Norman MacLeod.
- MacLeod, Ruairidh. H. F.S.A. Scot (1984). Transactions of the Gaelic Society of Inverness. Vol. LIII.
- Pollard, Tony (2009). Culloden: The History and Archaeology of the last Clan Battle. South Yorkshire: Pen and Sword Books. ISBN 978-1-84884-020-1.
- Sage, Donald (1899). "I: The Minister of Lochcarron and His times". Memorabilia Domestica or Parish Life in the North of Scotland (2nd ed.). Wick, Caithness and Edinburgh: W. Rae and J. Menzies.
- Simpson, Peter (1996). The Independent Highland Companies, 1603 - 1760. Edinburgh: John Donald Publishers. ISBN 0-85976-432-X.

== See also ==
- Lord Reay
- Chiefs of Clan Mackay
- Scottish clan

Peerage of Scotland
| Preceded by John Mackay | Lord Reay; 1681–1748 | Succeeded by Donald Mackay |
