= Skirmish of Keith =

1746 skirmish

- Part of the Jacobite rising of 1745
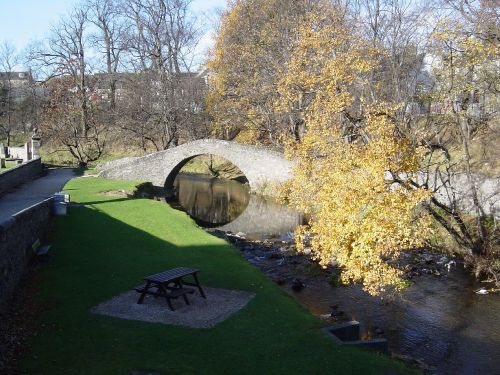
- The Auld Brig (old bridge) at Keith
Date	20 March 1746
Location	Keith, Moray, Scotland
Result	Jacobite victory

Belligerents
(Kingdom of Great Britain) Campbell of Argyll Militia	Jacobites from: Clan Stewart; French hussars

Commanders and leaders
(Kingdom of Great Britain) Captain Alexander Campbell	Major Nicholas Glasgow; Captain Robert Stewart

Strength
	900 or 1,000 men

Casualties and losses
9 killed About 80 taken prisoner Between 20 and 30 horses lost	1 Frenchman killed and a "good number wounded"

The Skirmish of Keith was a conflict that took place on the 20 March 1746 in Keith, Moray, Scotland and was part of the Jacobite rising of 1745.

== Background ==
In March 1746, Captain Alexander Campbell with about 70 Campbells and 30 of the Duke of Kingston's Regiment of Light Horse: troops of the British-Hanoverian Government and Prince William, Duke of Cumberland, entered the town of Keith, Moray. At that time, men who supported the Jacobite Prince Charles Edward Stuart were at Spey and had heard a rumour that the Duke of Cumberland's army was on their way and wou’d cut them all to pices. Lord John Drummond who commanded these Jacobites ordered the bagpipes to play and drums to beat and they began their march to take up the ground for action. They were joined by about 500 men of Roy Stewart's and Lord Elcho's; which with Lord Drummond's men amounted to about 900 or 1000 men in all. At last light the detachment of Kingston's Light horse appeared within less than a mile of the hill of Fochabers but did not see any of the Jacobites. A detachment of Roy Stewart's men was ordered to take guard under Captain Ludowick Stewart. Captain Stewart ordered a party to march over the hill and to wait there for further orders from Major Glasgow who was to command the whole force. Captain Robert Stewart had not been there for longer than a quarter of an hour when a small body of French hussars came riding down the street and told him that the detachment from Kingston's Light Horse was in the Fir Park, near the town; that they had been firing at one another for some time; and that they wanted a party of his men to go into the park and attack them. Captain Stewart replied that he could only do this on the orders of Major Glasgow. Major Glasgow arrived about three quarters of an hour later with a detachment of Lord Ogilvie's men, about 16 of the French and about 20 or 30 horse. Together with the French hussars they entered the park but found none of the enemy. They then marched towards to the town of Keith, arriving there at about twelve o'clock at night.

== Skirmish ==
The Jacobites were challenged by the Campbell sentry. They answered to him that they were friends of the Campbells and he welcomed them in. They then overpowered the Campbell sentry and entered the town, where the action began. The French began the action and a general "huza" was given up with the words "God save Prince Charles". The action continued on both sides for about half an hour with the fire from the Campbells coming very hard from the windows of the kirk. Captain Robert Stewart was severely wounded with a musket ball through both of his shoulders. Major Glasgow requested that Captain Robert Stewart send a party of men to the kirk as he thought it was likely that he was going to be over-powered in the streets. Captain Stewart immediately came down the street where there was a prettie hot action for some time, but took all of the enemy prisoner.

== Aftermath ==
There was word that the Duke of Cumberland had 700 horse lodged in the vicinity that the Jacobites might be attacked by and so Captain Stewart rode at the rear of the prisoners, to prevent them falling into enemy hands, as they were carried over the bridge to Spey. In the skirmish 9 of the Duke of Cumberland's men had been killed, a good number were wounded and about 80 were taken prisoner. On Prince Charlie's side there was one Frenchman killed, but a good many wounded, particularly among Lord Ogilvie's men who had been exposed to the fire from the kirk.

== See also ==
- Jacobite risings
- Jacobite rising of 1745
- Battle of Culloden
