= Alexander Mackay (British Army officer) =

Scottish soldier in the British Army and politician

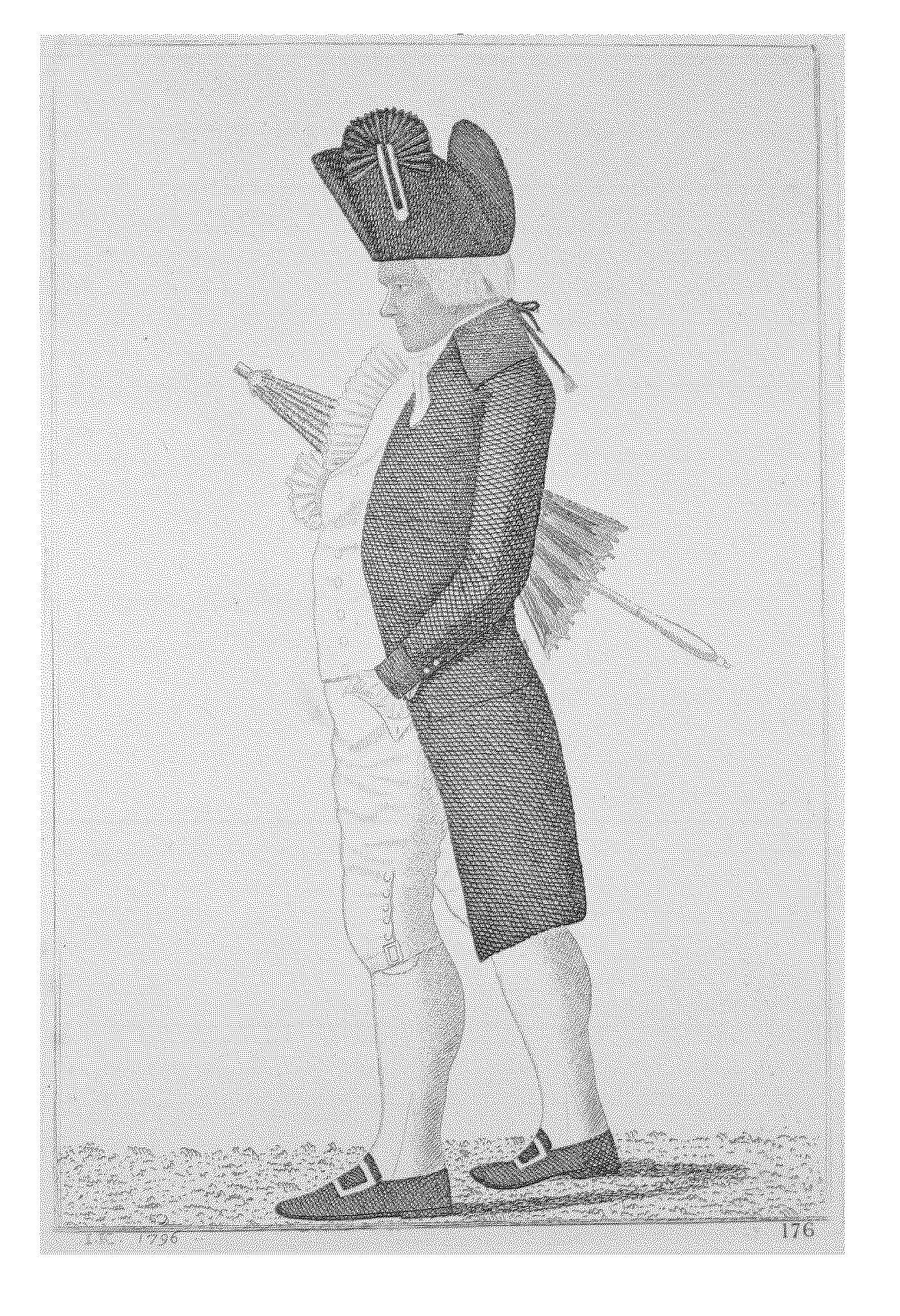
A caricature of Alexander Mackay by John Kay

General Alexander Mackay (1717 – 31 May 1789) was a Scottish soldier in the British Army, and a politician. The son of George Mackay, 3rd Lord Reay, he was the younger brother of George Mackay of Skibo (c.1715–1782).

== Military career ==
Mackay was commissioned in the British Army in 1737, as an ensign in the 25th Foot. He was promoted to lieutenant in the 47th Foot in 1740 and to captain in Lord Loudon's Regiment in 1745. During the Jacobite rising of 1745, he was captured by Jacobite forces at the Battle of Prestonpans. Serving with his regiment in Flanders from 1747 until 1748, he received promotion to the rank of major in George Howard's Regiment of Foot on 17 February 1749, replacing Cyrus Trapaud, who was promoted to lieutenant-colonel in the same regiment. Mackay became a lieutenant-colonel in Hedworth Lambton's Regiment of Foot on 18 December 1755. Mackay served out much of the Seven Years' War in Ireland, where he raised his own regiment in 1762. In the summer of 1768 he was appointed to command British forces sent to keep the peace in Boston, Massachusetts. Owing to a rough crossing of the Atlantic that necessitated a stop-over in the West Indies, he did not arrive to take up the post until April 1769. Perturbed by the rising opposition to the imposition of customs duties in North America and by the need to look after his private affairs in England he received permission from Thomas Gage, commander of British forces, to relinquish his command in August 1769.

Holding major-generals rank by 1772 Mackay was appointed, on 22 January, to be Governor of Tynemouth and Clifford's Fort, following the death of previous governor Sir Andrew Agnew. He submitted an application to become commander of the East India Company's forces in April 1777 and received the support of King George III but was turned down as the company "objected to gentlemen of North Britain [Scotland] for commands in chief". Mackay was promoted to lieutenant-general on 6 September 1777 and became Governor of Landguard Fort on 14 April 1778 after the death of Sir John Clavering. On 13 May 1780 he was appointed Commander of the forces in North Britain, replacing Sir James Adolphus Oughton, and instigated reforms to reduce expenditure and remove sinecures.

Mackay's brother George, 5th Lord Reay, died in 1782 and Alexander assumed control of the estate on behalf of his nephew, Hugh (the 6th Lord Reay), who was deemed to be an imbecile. In this capacity he proposed a postal service for Sutherland, assisted the kelp and fishing industries and constructed the pier at Eriboll. Following the death of Sir James Campbell Mackay became, on 8 November 1788, the Governor of Stirling Castle, a post he would hold until his own death. His replacement at Landguard was Harry Trelawny.

Mackay also successively held the colonelcies of the 122nd Regiment of Foot (1762–1764), the 65th Regiment of Foot (1764–1770) and the Royal North British Fusiliers (1770 until his death).

== Political career ==
Mackay was elected at the 1761 general election as the Member of Parliament (MP) for Sutherland, succeeding his brother George.

As part of an electoral agreement between the Mackays and the Duke of Sutherland, he stood down from Sutherland at the 1768 election, and was returned instead for Tain Burghs. He resigned his seat in March 1773, by the procedural device of accepting appointment to the sinecure of Steward of the Chiltern Hundreds.

Parliament of Great Britain
Preceded by George Mackay	Member of Parliament for Sutherland; 1761–1768	Succeeded by James Wemyss
Preceded by John Scott	Member of Parliament for Tain Burghs; 1768–1773	Succeeded by James Grant
Military offices
Preceded by Sir John Clavering	Governor of Landguard Fort; 1778–1788	Succeeded by Harry Trelawny
Preceded by Sir James Campbell, 3rd Bt	Governor of Stirling Castle; 1788–1789	Succeeded by James Grant
Preceded by Sir James Adolphus Oughton	Commander-in-Chief, Scotland; 1780–1788	Succeeded by ???
Preceded by William Maule, 1st Earl of Panmure	Colonel of the Scots Fuzileers; 1770–1789	Succeeded by James Murray
Preceded by Earl of Cholmondeley	Colonel of the 65th Regiment of Foot; 1764–1770	Succeeded by Edward Urmston
