= Skirmish of Tongue =

1746 military conflict

- Part of the Jacobite rising of 1745
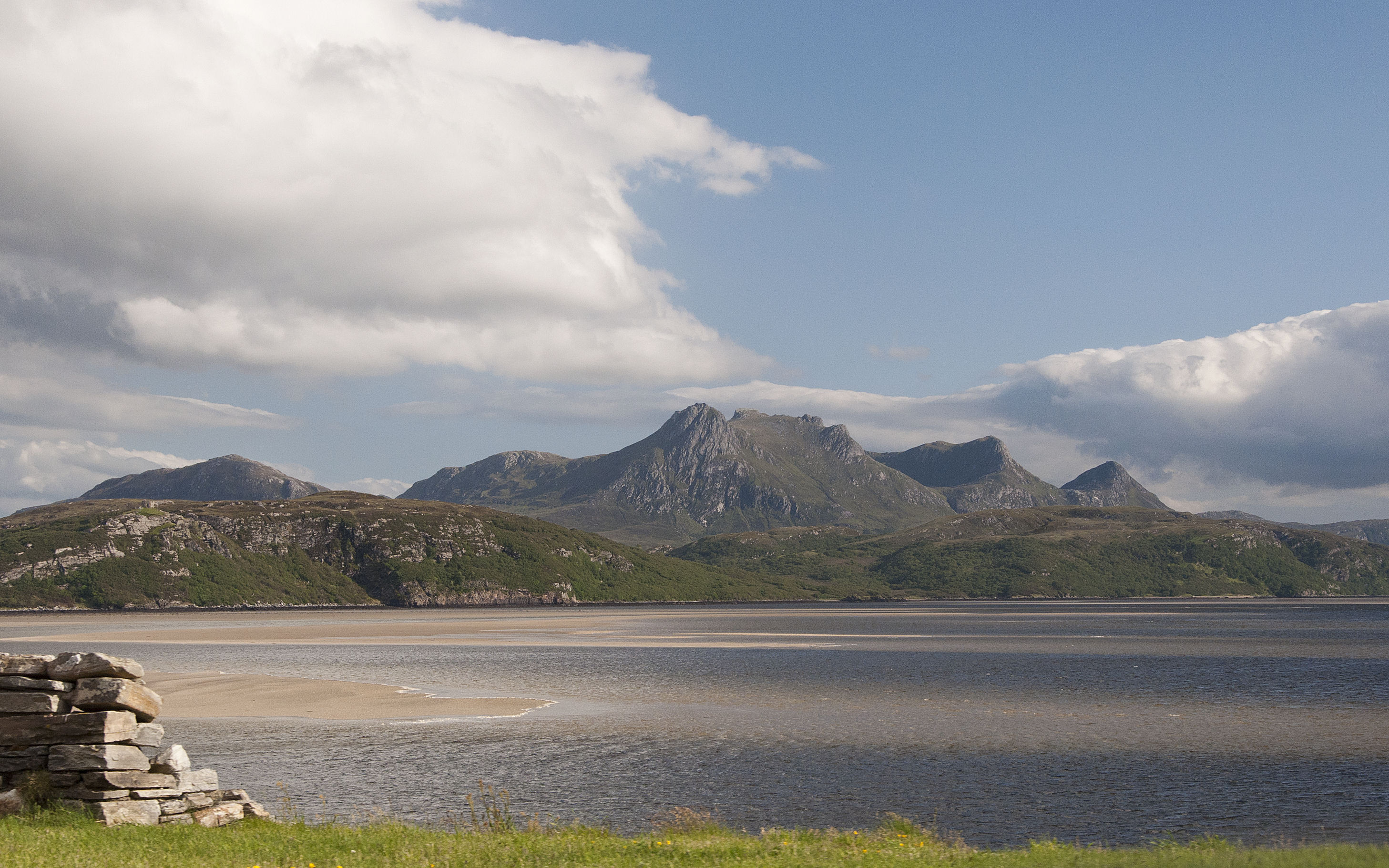
- The Kyle of Tongue
Date	25 – 26 March 1746
Location	Tongue, Highland, Scotland
Result	Loyalist/Government victory

Belligerents
(Kingdom of Great Britain) Highlanders loyal to the British Government: Some from Loudon's 64th Regiment and Two Independent Companies drawn from Clan Mackay and Clan Sutherland.	Jacobite Highlanders Supported by: France; Spain

Commanders and leaders
(Kingdom of Great Britain) Sir Harry Munro, 7th Baronet; Captain George Mackay; Captain Hugh Mackay	

Strength
80	160

Casualties and losses
Unknown	4 or 5 killed. 8 wounded 156 captured

The Skirmish of Tongue was a battle that took place in March 1746 near Tongue in the Scottish Highlands during the Jacobite Rising of 1745.

== Background ==
On 25 March 1746 a French ship named the Le Prince Charles, formerly HMS Hazard, which carried £13,000 in gold, arms and other supplies to Inverness for the Jacobite leader Charles Edward Stuart ran into the Kyle of Tongue while being pursued by the British frigate HMS Sheerness. During the night the crew and soldiers disembarked carrying the money, however the following day Captain George Mackay, son of the chief of the Clan Mackay, who supported the British government confronted them at a place named Druim Na Coub and after a short fight Mackay captured the men and the money.

== Battle ==
An account of the fight was reported in the London Gazette of 15 April 1746:

Aberdeen, April 6. Captain Mackay, Lord Reay's son, and Sir Henry Munro, son of the late Sir Robert, both Captains in Lord Loudon's regiment, are just come hither with letters from Captain O'Brian of Sheerness man of war, now off this place giving an account that after chasing the Le Prince Charles above 56 leagues he drove her ashore and obliged the French and Spaniards who were in her to quit her and to land, which they did with five chests of money to the value of £12,000 and upwards, in order to join the rebels; but the Lord Reay (Mackay) in whose country they were landed and whose house Captain Mackay, Sir Henry Munro, Lord [?Captain] Charles Gordon, and Captain MacLeod with some others of Lord Loudon's regiment were, with about 80 men of said regiment, who had been driven thither by the rebels, marched out and attacked them, and after killing three or four, and dangerously wounding eight, took the remaining 156, officers, soldiers, and sailors prisoners, who were immediately embarked on board the Sheerness, and the prize with the Highland officers and men who made the capture are now here.....The money that was landed out of the Hazard sloop, was taken by Lord Reay's men.

== Aftermath and significance ==
The historian Ruairidh MacLeod gives details of what was done with the money captured from the Jacobites. Captain George Mackay, Sir Harry Munro, Lord Charles Gordon, John MacLeod, Lieutenant Reid and Ensign MacLaggan all received £700 each of the captured booty. Ensign Aneas Mackay received £200. Lieutenant Daniel Forbes received £100. The sergeants each received £50 and the privates each got £7 or £8 which was the equivalent to eight or nine months pay. According to historian R. W Munro writing in 1977, the captured money amounted to £12,000 and was mostly English Gold.

The historian Angus Mackay in the Book of Mackay writes of the significance of the Skirmish of Tongue as having more to do with the overthrow of Charles at Culloden than is generally realized by the fact that money and supplies had been cut off, which were destined for the Jacobites. In the aftermath of the conflict at Tongue, the Mackays continued to fight against the Jacobite rebels in the Highlands and defeated the Jacobite Mackenzie, Earl of Cromarty at the Battle of Littleferry.
