= Campbell of Argyll Militia =

The Campbell of Argyll Militia also known as the Campbell militia, the Argyll militia, or the Argyllshire men, was an irregular militia unit formed in 1745 by John Campbell, 4th Duke of Argyll to oppose the Jacobite rising of 1745.

== Formation ==
John Campbell, 4th Duke of Argyll was also the chief of the Clan Campbell and the men of the militia were raised from his clan lands of Argyll in the south-west of the Scottish Highlands. Similar in fashion to the eighteen Independent Highland Companies that were raised in 1745 by Duncan Forbes, Lord Culloden in the north, north-west and north-east Highlands, also to oppose the Jacobite rising of 1745, the Campbell of Argyll militia was raised with permission from a Royal warrant. However, although the militia was raised with official permission from the government, like the Independent Highland Companies it was not considered an official regiment of the line of the British Army.

== Jacobite rising of 1745 ==
On 20 March 1746 a detachment of the Campbell of Argyll militia was defeated at the Skirmish of Keith. From the 20 March to 3 April 1746, 300 men of the Campbell of Argyll militia helped in the successful defense during the Siege of Fort William.

Twelve companies of the Campbell of Argyll militia, led by John Campbell, 5th Duke of Argyll, fought against the Jacobites at the Battle of Falkirk Muir but were defeated. Four companies of the Campbell of Argyll militia, commanded by the 5th Duke of Argyll, fought for the British Government at the Battle of Culloden in 1746 where the Jacobites were defeated. During the battle the Argyll militia delivered devastating musket fire on the right flank of the Jacobite army. Only one member of the Argyll militia was returned as a casualty during the battle; Captain John Campbell of Achnaba, who was mortally wounded.

After the Jacobite rising of 1745 was over, both the 4th and 5th Dukes of Argyll used the Campbell of Argyll militia to hunt down the Jacobites. For example, the Campbell of Argyll militia took part in the Raids on Lochaber and Shiramore from May to August 1746. However, according to a Campbell historian the Campbell of Argyll militia had behaved with some compassion. The Duke of Argyll was formally congratulated by King George II of Great Britain on the behavior of the Argyll militia.

== See also ==
- Duke of Argyll
- Clan Campbell
- Jacobite rising of 1745
- Independent Highland Companies - similar irregular Scottish militia formations.
- Earl of Argyll's Regiment of Foot - 17th century regular regiment of the line.
- Loudon's Highlanders
