= The Real McCoy =

The Real McCoy may refer to:

== Film and television ==
- The Real McCoy (film), 1993 film starring Kim Basinger
- The Real McCoy, 1999 film starring Andy McCoy
- The Real McCoy, 2013 documentary film about pioneer rum runner William McCoy
- The Real McCoy (TV series), a 1991–1996 British comedy television series
- The Real McCoys, a 1957–1962 American television series starring Walter Brennan and Richard Crenna that aired on CBS

== Music ==
- Real McCoy (band), a Eurodance group popular in the 1990s
- The Real McCoy, 1960s–70s era Irish showband

=== Albums ===
- The Real McCoy, album by Charlie McCoy
- The Real McCoy (Van McCoy album), 1976
- The Real McCoy (McCoy Tyner album), 1967

=== Songs ===
- "The Real McCoy", a 1970s track by Klaus Schulze released in the box set Historic Edition
- "The Real McCoy", a 1988 song by Scottish rock band The Silencers
- "The Real McCoy", a 2012 song by Get Cape. Wear Cape. Fly

== Other uses ==
- The real McCoy, a phrase meaning "the real thing" or "the genuine article"
- McCoy's (crisp), a brand of potato chips marketed under the slogan "The Real McCoy"
- Dundas Real McCoys, a hockey team in Dundas, Ontario
- The Real McCoy (book), a 2003 novel by American writer Darin Strauss, based on the life of the boxer Charles "Kid" McCoy
- The Real McCoy (play) a 2006 stage play by Canadian playwright Andrew Moodie based on the life of inventor Elijah McCoy
- Real McCoy (ferry), a ferryboat that operated for 63 years from Rio Vista, California
