= Raids on Lochaber and Shiramore =

1746 raid in the Scottish Highlands

- Part of the Jacobite rising of 1745
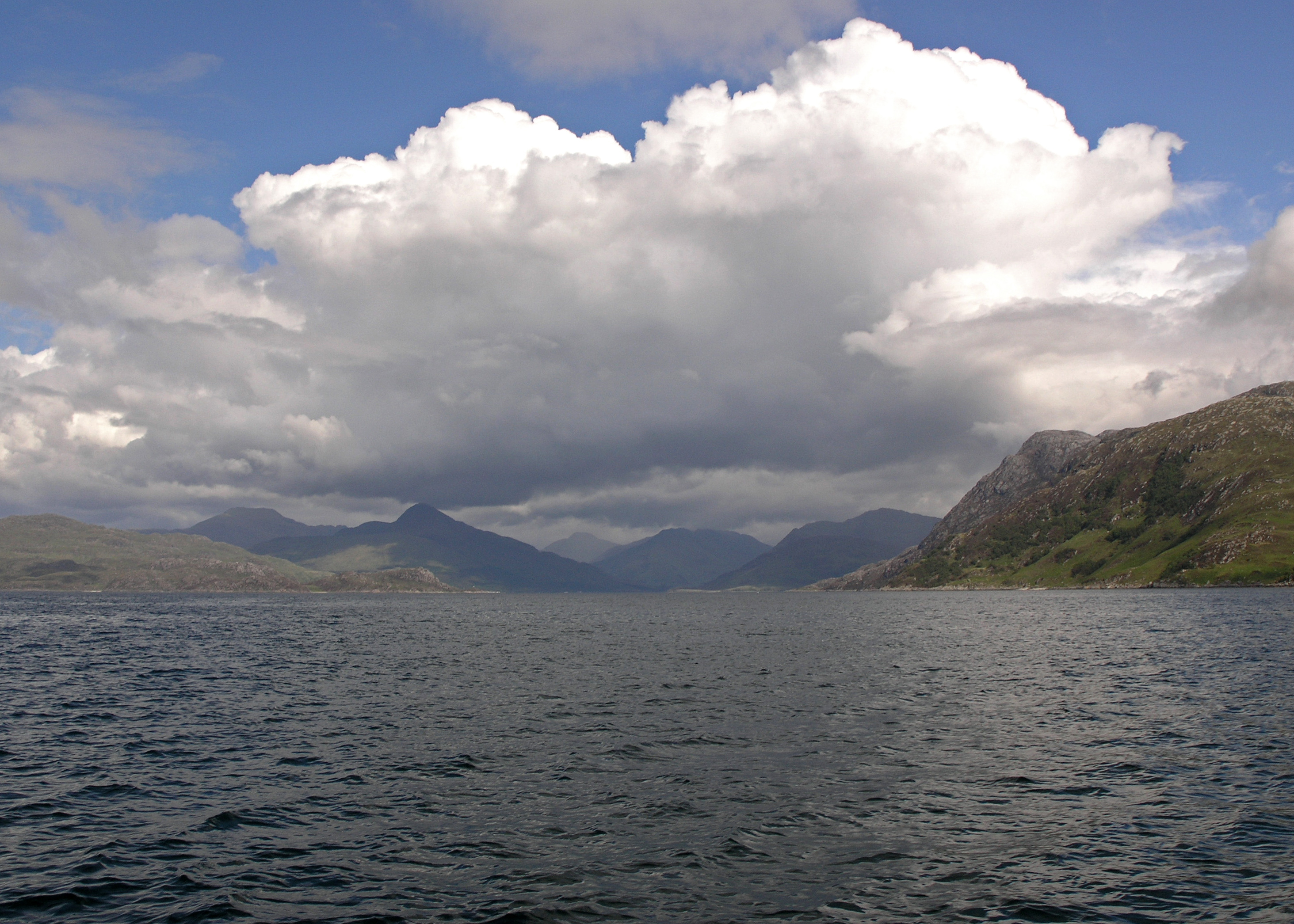
- Knoydart, Lochaber
Date	22 May – 31 August 1746
Location	Lochaber and Shiramore (Badenoch), Scottish Highlands
Result	British-Hanoverian Government victory: the north and western Highlands were cleared of Jacobite rebels, but the Jacobite leader Charles Edward Stuart escaped to France

Belligerents
(Kingdom of Great Britain) Great Britain	Jacobites

Commanders and leaders
(Kingdom of Great Britain) Duke of Cumberland; General Bland; Duke of Argyll; Earl of Loudoun; Viscount Sackville; Jack Campbell; Lieutenant-colonel Cornwallis; Lieutenant-colonel Lord Albemarle	Bonnie Prince Charlie; Cameron of Lochiel; Coll MacDonnell; Aeneas McDonnell; Laird of Mackinnon

Casualties and losses
Captain George Munro of Culcairn killed	Many surrendered and taken prisoner Some executed Some fled into exile

The Raids on Lochaber and Shiramore (Scottish Gaelic: Bliadhna nan Creach) ("The Year of the Pillaging") took place in the Scottish Highlands between 22 May and 31 August 1746 and were part of the closing operations of the British-Hanoverian Government to bring to an end the Jacobite rising of 1745. Sometimes referred to as the "mopping up" operations, many rebels, forced to come of out of hiding by a scorched earth campaign by government troops, surrendered themselves and their arms, while others remained at large until they were captured and punished. It also included the hunt for the Jacobite leader Bonnie Prince Charles Edward Stuart otherwise known as the Young Pretender. Most of the work was done on behalf of the Government by the Independent Highland Companies of militia, the Campbell of Argyll Militia and also Loudon's Highlanders regiment.

== Background ==
The Jacobite rising of 1745 had ultimately been defeated at the Battle of Culloden that took place on 16 April 1746, not far from Inverness. On 7 May, Lord Loudoun (John Campbell, 4th Earl of Loudoun), supporter of the British-Hanoverian Government, left Inverness and ordered the independent companies to march to Fort Augustus. They arrived there from Urquhart and Beauly on 8 May. On 14 May, George Munro, 1st of Culcairn's company reached Fort Augustus and by this time there were rumours that the Jacobite leader, known as the Young Pretender (Charles Edward Stuart) had got off a French ship and had been on the isles of Harris and Lewis. On 16 May, Lord Loudoun made a return of the independent companies at Fort Augustus which totaled 1,526 men. On the same day General Bland arrived at Fort Augustus with three battalions of Kingston's Horse. On 19 May, Major-general John Campbell wrote from Fort William that the rebel Jacobite Coll MacDonell of Barisdale had gone to Loch Arkaig with 120 men and that the Glengarry folk were to join him, that there were new arms and Lochgarry, the Macphersons and Frasers were also expected. Lord Loudoun with the seventeen independent companies marched five miles from Fort Augustus to Aberchalder to make room for Prince William, Duke of Cumberland who was expected with the army. On 20 May, Lieutenant-colonel Jack Campbell of Loudon's Highlanders Regiment, commanding 250 men of the Campbell of Argyll Militia arrived at Fort Augustus on his way to join his father at Fort William.

On 21 May, a man named Murdoch Macrae from Kintail was captured by one of the MacDonald independent companies whilst in Glen Garry. Macrae gave information on the rebels gathering at Achnacarry, but Lord Loudoun considered him a spy and sent him to the Duke of Cumberland who was then still at Inverness. Macrae arrived at Inverness at 8am and was hanged before 10am. General Bland then decided that Lord Loudoun should make a raid into Lochaber.

== Raid on Lochaber ==
On 22 May 1746, Lord Loudoun with 300 regular troops, 250 men of the Campbell of Argyll Militia and eight Independent Highland Companies of the MacDonalds, Mackenzies, Rosses, Grants and Mackays marched down the Great Glen. George Munro of Culcairn with another 300 regulars and eight Independent Highland Companies of the Munros, MacLeods, Geanies' and Sutherlands marched by way of Glen Garry to meet up with the other force at Loch Arkaig. The town of Inverness independent company was left at Aberchalder.

On 24 May, Lord Loudoun almost captured the rebel Jacobite Donald Cameron of Lochiel who was forced to disperse his men and flee to Rannoch. On 25 May, Lord Loudoun left Achnacarry after large numbers of Camerons had come in and surrendered their arms. Loudoun then marched to Moy, while the regular troops were ordered back to Fort Augustus. Loudoun was joined by Munro of Culcairn who had burnt Achnacarry Castle. On 27 May, Loudoun marched for Rannoch with ten independent companies of the Sutherlands, Mackays, MacDonalds and MacLeods. Meanwhile, six other companies were left at Moy with Munro of Culcairn. In order to "root out" the remainder of the rebels who were still in arms, the Duke of Cumberland ordered Lord George Sackville to march to Knoydart and Lieutenant-colonel Cornwallis to march to Loch Arkaig. On 30 May, the Duke of Cumberland had reached Fort William and Lord Loudoun returned from Rannoch to meet him, and some days later Loudoun returned to Laggan, Badenoch.

== Raid on Shiramore ==
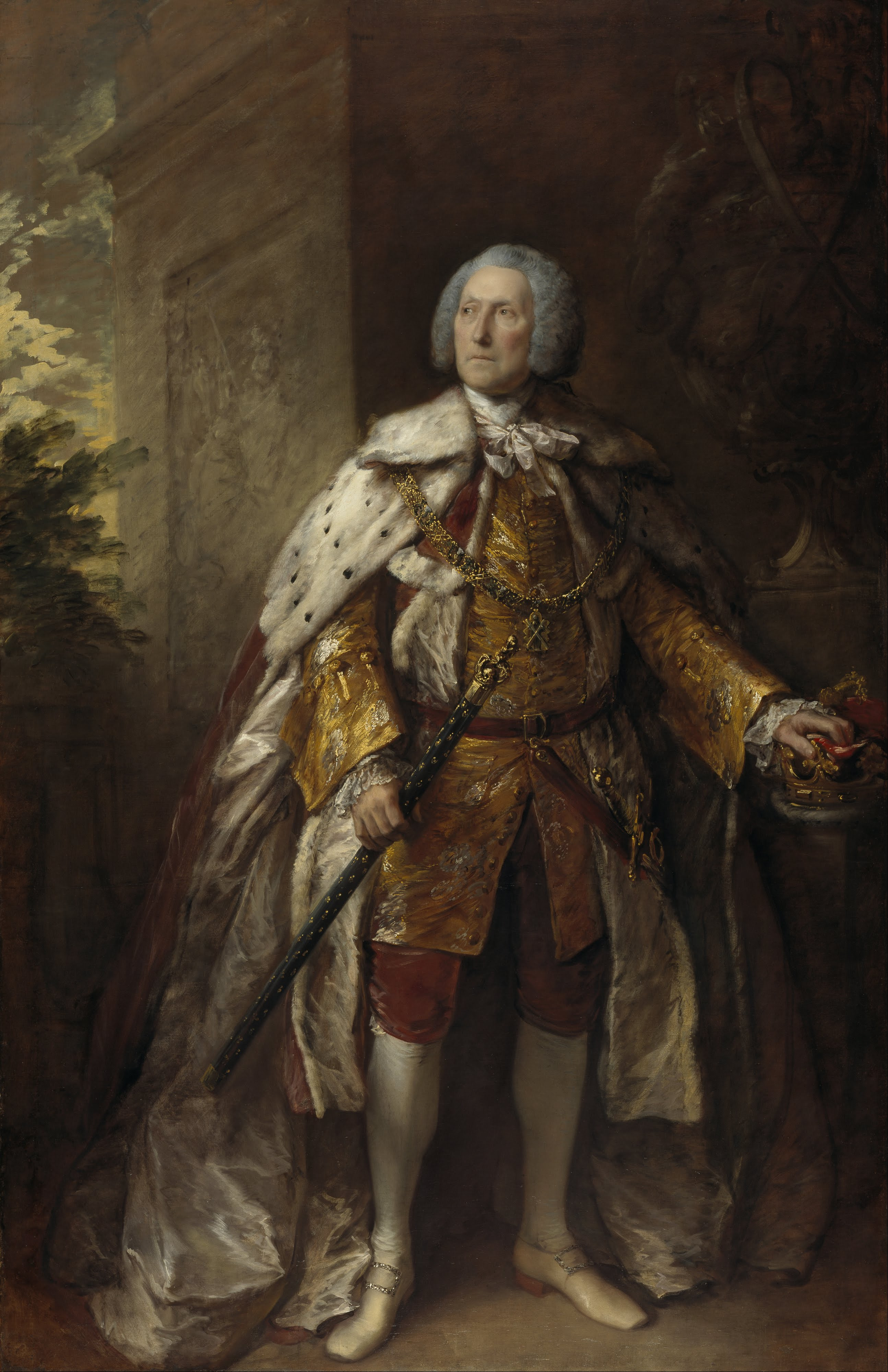
Major-general Campbell

On 1 June 1746, the two Sutherland independent companies and one of the MacLeod independent companies had reached Shiramore. By 2 June, the remaining MacLeod companies and the three MacDonald companies had also arrived and on 3 June the two Mackay companies had arrived. All of these companies made returns of their soldiers. Meanwhile, at Moy, Munro of Culcairn wrote that 107 rebels had come in and surrendered their arms.

On 10 June, Aeneas MacDonnell, brother of Kinlochmoidart, who had already been captured, finally admitted to Major-general Campbell that the Young Pretender had sailed to South Uist. On 11 June, Munro of Culcairn marched with his seven companies from Moy to Linachan and at Inverness Lord Loudoun made a return of more than 2,000 firelocks collected in five weeks.

On 13 June, the rebel Jacobite Coll MacDonell of Barisdale submitted at Glenelg and two days later he met Lord Loudoun and Sir Alexander MacDonald having been offered terms in exchange for information about the Young Pretender.

== Hunt for the Young Pretender ==
On 16 June, Lord Loudoun having received information about the Young Pretender ordered six independent companies to Skye, these were the three MacLeod and three MacDonald companies who were under the command of MacLeod of Talisker. Three of the companies were to be transported to South Uist. On 21 June MacLeod of Talisker crossed over to Skye and marched to Loch Bracadale where Bernera's, Aird's and Kirkibost's companies were to embark for South Uist. However, they were prevented from doing so by bad storms. On 29 June the storms having stopped the three companies sailed to South Uist, arriving the next day. On 30 June, William Tolmie at Dunvegan Castle wrote to the Laird of MacLeod that the latest information was that "the Young Gentleman went from South Uist upon Tuesday (24 June) for the mainland in an eight oared boat and upon Wednesday was endeavouring in to Ruindunan. But a crowed of people from the land frightened them from landing in there place, so went off but God knows where".

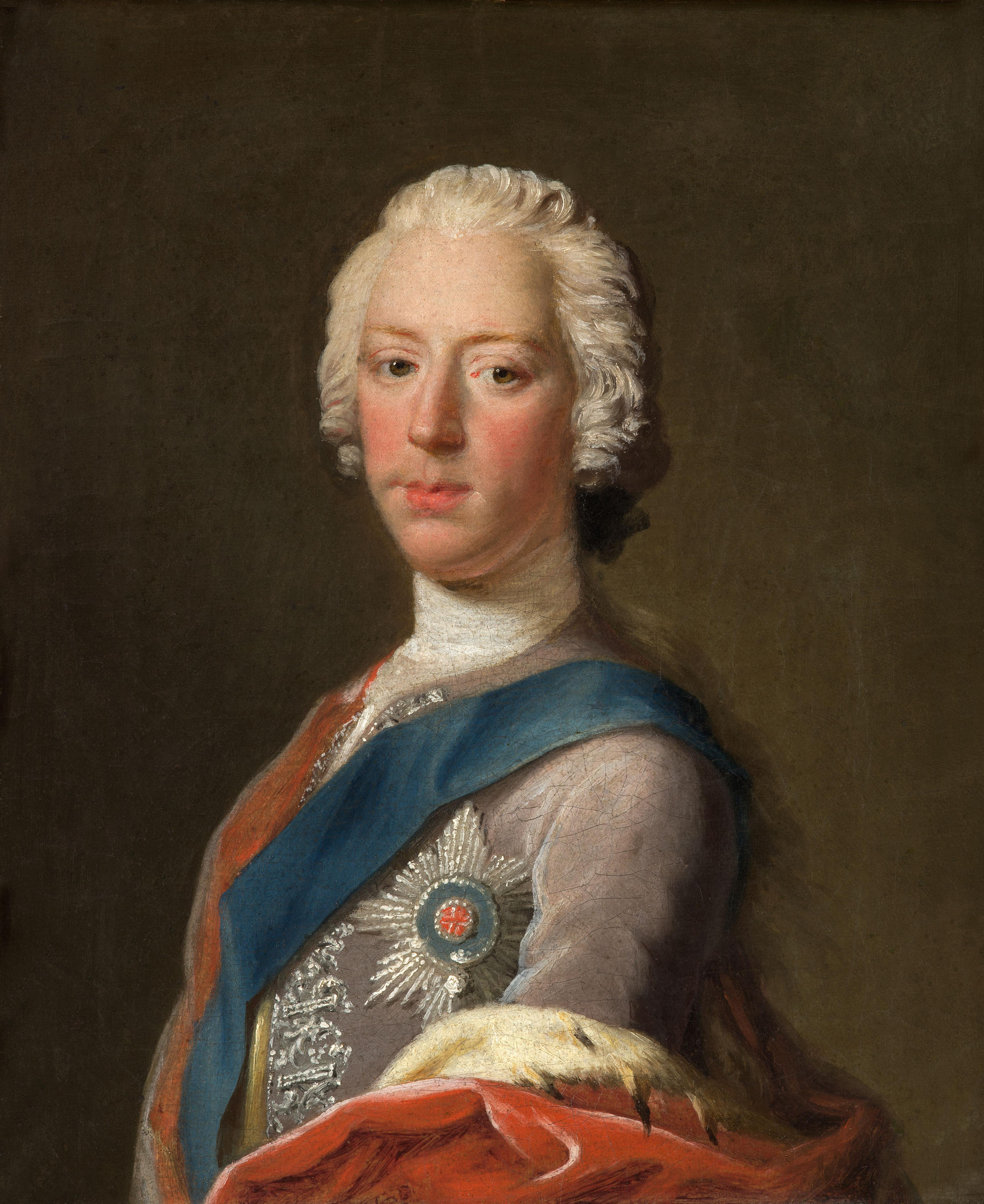
Charles Edward Stuart known as the Young Pretender

On 27 June, Munro of Culcairn now at Shiramore had been ordered to Caithness with his own company, the Rosses and Geanies'. He reached Thurso on 7 July. On the same day Talisker was at a place called Unish having gone there on information that the Young Pretender was there. On 8 July, Talisker hurried over to Mugstot in Trotternish having heard news that the Young Pretender had landed there on 29 June disguised in women's clothes. On 10 July, General Campbell reached Skye from Barra having received information that the Young Pretender had left Portree along with the Laird of Mackinnon. That day the old Laird of Mackinnon was captured in Morar and he confirmed that the Young Pretender had left Skye on 4 July. On 13 July, the Duke of Cumberland at Fort Augustus ordered that a chain was to be formed from Loch Eil to Loch Hourn in order to seal off Morar and Arisaig. Alexander Gunn and George Mackay's independent companies were ordered into the chain. Lord Loudoun then ordered Munro of Culcairn with his three companies to march for Gairloch to guard the coast against the landing of the Young Pretender. On 18 July, the Duke of Cumberland left Fort Augustus and was greeted in triumph a few days later in London. That day Munro of Culcain and his three companies left Thurso. On 21 July, the Young Pretender slipped through the cordon at Glencosie. On 24 July, the cordon was withdrawn and Alexander Gunn's company returned to Shiramore, but George Mackay's company was ordered to Loch Broom. Munro of Culcairn reached Loch Broom on the same day having marched 120 miles in seven days. However, Lord Albemarle who was now in charge at Fort Augustus ordered Culcairn back to Thurso. In late July, the Young Pretender's body double, Roderick Mackenzie, was shot dead in mistake for him which gave him time to escape from being pursued in Glenmoriston. Alexander MacDonald of Kingsburgh who had been brought in as a prisoner and whose house The Young Pretender had stayed in was sent off to Edinburgh on 29 July. Culcairn prepared to march back to Thurso on 30 July, but on 1 August, whilst at Foulis Castle, he received orders from Lord Loudoun to go back to Loch Broom. He set off to Loch Broom the next day having marched 92 miles in five days. He sent detachments to Rhu Stoer and Loch Ewe, and was joined by George Mackay's company.

MacDonald of Barrisdale made arrangements to meet Captain John Sutherland of Forse, but he claimed that he had waited at the rendezvous point but no one had turned up. Lord Albemarle who thoroughly disliked the Highlands left Fort Augustus on 13 August for Edinburgh. On 19 August, Lord Loudoun ordered Munro of Culcairn to sweep through Knoydart with his four companies and into Lochaber and he reached Fort Augustus on 23 August. Captain Alexander Grant of Knockando sent out a detachment that nearly caught the Young Pretender at Torvuilt.

== Murder of Munro of Culcairn ==
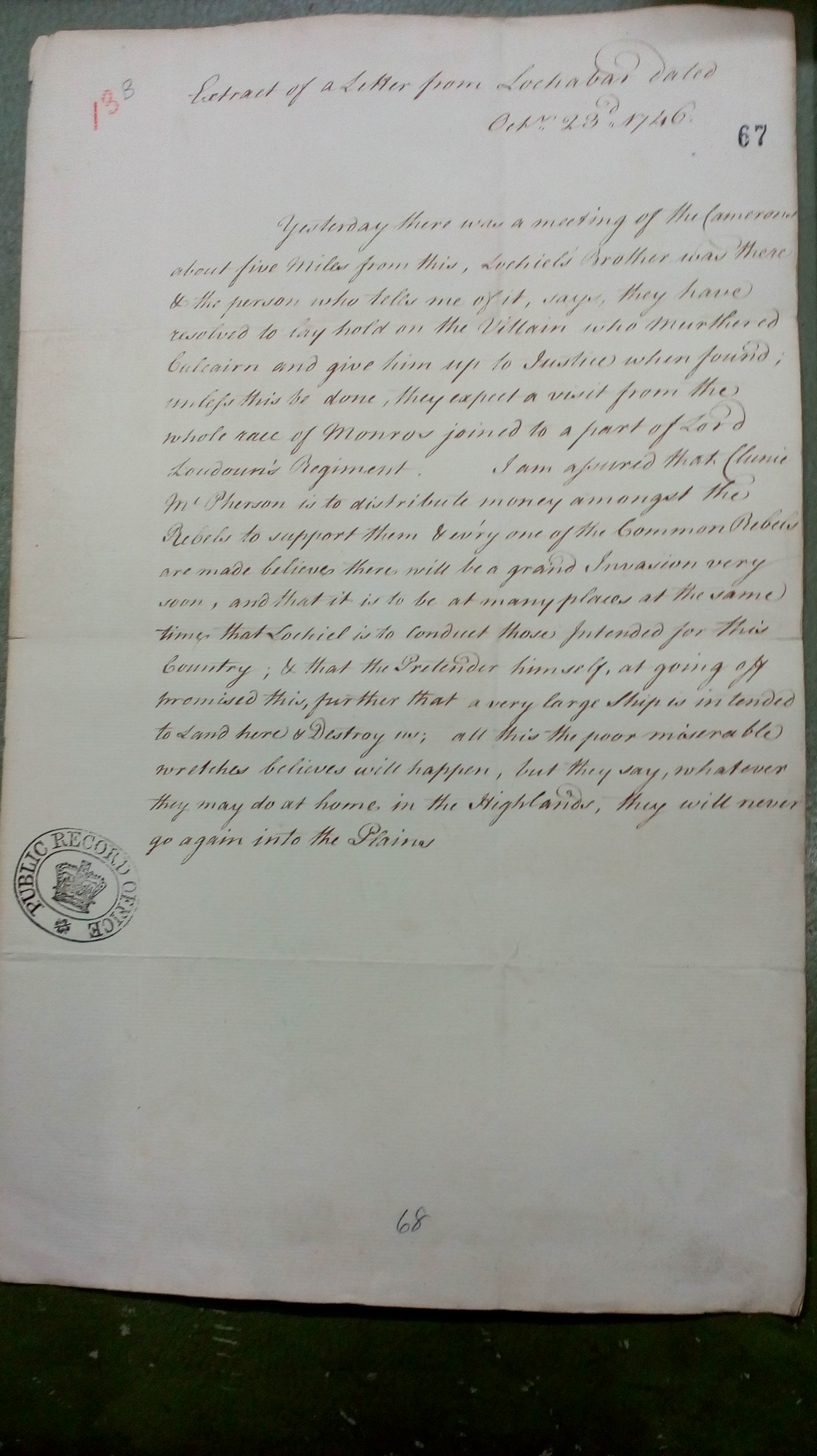
Letter to Lord Albemarle dated 23 October 1746 that reads Yesterday there was a meeting of the Camerons about five miles from this, Lochiel's brother was there & the person who tells me of it says, they have resolved to lay hold on the villain who murdered (George Munro of) Culcairn and give him up to the Justice when found, unless this be done they expect a visit from the whole race of Monros (Munros).

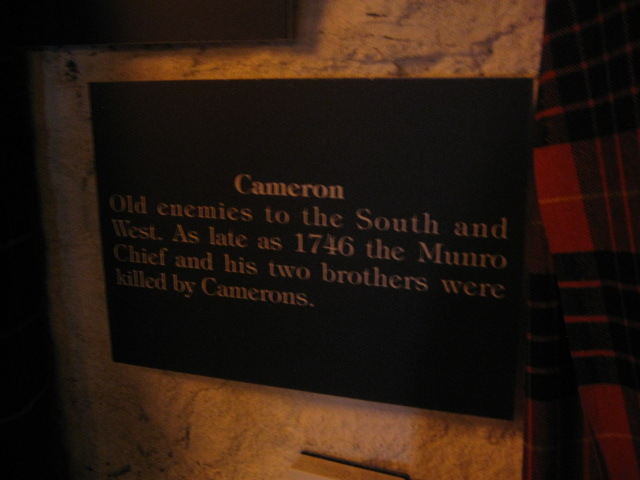
Clan Cameron tartan in the Clan Munro exhibition at the Storehouse of Foulis

On 31 August, Munro of Culcairn's four companies joined up with Captain Grant's detachment. However, during a march along Loch Arkaig, Culcairn was shot dead by someone in the woods. Parties were sent to search for the assassin but found nothing. The Rev. John Cameron maintained that Culcairn was shot by mistake for Captain Grant, in revenge, by the father of a man killed on the orders of Grant. Lord Albemarle reported that the murderer of Culcairn was John Roy McFie who was frequently called John Roy Cameron and who lived at Auchinsoul on North Arkaigside. The MacGillonies (who were a branch or sept of Clan Cameron), later delivered up a suspect called Evan Bane as a scapegoat, Lord Loudoun reacted angrily ordering Cameron of Fassefern to find the right man within ten days.

== Escape of the Young Pretender ==
Between late August and late September 1746 the independent companies were gradually reduced and disbanded. In the early hours of 20 September, the Young Pretender sailed from Loch nan Uamh having only had the under strength companies of Lord Loudoun's Regiment to contend with.

== See also ==
- Jacobite risings
- Jacobite rising of 1745
- Independent Highland Companies
- Campbell of Argyll Militia
- Charles Edward Stuart

== Bibliography ==
- MacLeod, Ruairidh. H. F.S.A. Scot (1984). Transactions of the Gaelic Society of Inverness. Vol. LIII.
- Pollard, Tony (2009). Culloden: The History and Archaeology of the last Clan Battle. South Yorkshire: Pen and Sword Books. ISBN 978-1-84884-020-1.
