= Lord Reay =

Title in the Peerage of Scotland

- Azure on a chevron Or between three bears' heads couped Argent muzzled Gules a roebuck's head erased between two hands grasping daggers the points turned inwards all Proper
- Creation date: 1628
- Peerage: Peerage of Scotland
- First holder: Donald Mackay, 1st Lord Reay
- Present holder: Aeneas Simon Mackay, 15th Lord Reay
- Heir apparent: Alexander Shimi Markus Mackay, Master of Reay
- Subsidiary titles: Baron Reay
- Former seats: Tongue House; Castle Varrich
- Motto: Motto of Clan Mackay: Manu Forti (With a strong hand)

Lord Reay, of Reay in the County of Caithness, is a title in the Peerage of Scotland. Lord Reay (pronounced "ray") is the hereditary Clan Chief of Clan Mackay, whose lands in Strathnaver and northwest Sutherland were known as the Reay Country. The land was sold to the Earls of Sutherland in the 18th century. Lord Reay also refers to a legendary magician in Caithness folklore.

The title was created in 1628 for the soldier Sir Donald Mackay, 1st Baronet. He had already the year before been created a baronet, of Far, in the Baronetage of Nova Scotia. He was succeeded by his son, the second Lord, who fought as a Royalist in the Civil War. On the death of his great-grandson, the ninth Lord, the line of the eldest son of the second Lord failed. The late Lord was succeeded by his kinsman, the tenth Lord. He was the son of Barthold John Christian Mackay (who had been created Baron Mackay of Ophemert and Zennewijnen in the Netherlands in 1822), great-grandson of Hon. Aeneas Mackay, a Brigadier-General in the Dutch army and the second son of the second Lord. Lord Reay was a Dutch citizen and served as a government minister in the Netherlands. His son, the eleventh Lord, became a British citizen in 1877 and four years later he was created Baron Reay, of Durness in the County of Sutherland, in the Peerage of the United Kingdom. Lord Reay was later Governor of Bombay, Under-Secretary of State for India in the Liberal administration of Lord Rosebery and Lord Lieutenant of Roxburghshire.

On his death the UK Barony became extinct while he was succeeded in the other titles by his cousin, the twelfth Lord. He was the son of Baron Aeneas Mackay (1838–1909) (a Dutch politician who had been created Baron Mackay in the Netherlands in 1858 and who served as Prime Minister of the Netherlands from 1888 until 1891), son of Johan Francois Hendrik Jakob Ernestus Mackay, brother of the tenth Lord Reay. He was also a Dutch citizen. However, his son, the thirteenth Lord (and at 6'9" was nicknamed "the tallest peer"), became a British citizen in 1938 and later sat in the House of Lords as a Scottish representative peer. His only son, the fourteenth Lord, was a Member of the European Parliament and also served in junior positions in the Conservative administrations of Margaret Thatcher and John Major. He was one of the ninety-two elected hereditary peers allowed to remain after the passing of the House of Lords Act of 1999. As of 2019 the titles are held by his son, the fifteenth Lord, who in that year was also elected to serve in the House.

The family seat now is Ophemert Castle in the village Ophemert near Tiel, Gelderland, in the Netherlands.

== Lords Reay (1628) ==
- Donald Mackay, 1st Lord Reay (1591–1649)
- John Mackay, 2nd Lord Reay (c. 1612-c. 1680/1681)
- George Mackay, 3rd Lord Reay (1678–1748)
- Donald Mackay, 4th Lord Reay (died 1761)
- George Mackay, 5th Lord Reay (c. 1735–1768)
- Hugh Mackay, 6th Lord Reay (died 1797)
- Eric Mackay, 7th Lord Reay (1773–1847) (second son of George Mackay of Skibo)
- Alexander Mackay, 8th Lord Reay (1775–1863) (third son of George Mackay of Skibo)
- Eric Mackay, 9th Lord Reay (1813–1875)
- Aeneas Mackay, 10th Lord Reay (1806–1876)
- Donald James Mackay, 11th Lord Reay (1839–1921)
- Eric Mackay, 12th Lord Reay (1870–1921)
- Aeneas Alexander Mackay, 13th Lord Reay (1905–1963)
- Hugh William Mackay, 14th Lord Reay (1937–2013)
- Aeneas Simon Mackay, 15th Lord Reay (b. 1965)

The heir apparent is the present holder's son the Hon. Alexander Shimi Markus Mackay, Master of Reay (b. 2010)

== Lord Reay in Caithness folklore ==
In the folklore of Caithness, in the Highland area of Scotland, Lord Reay is a magician who believed he had come off best in an encounter with a witch in Smoo Cave. His prize was a gang of fairies who liked nothing better than to work. The construction of various earthworks in the parish of Reay are attributed to these fairies, working under direction from Lord Reay.

However, the fairies' appetite for work was insatiable and, eventually, their demands became intolerable. So Lord Reay put them to work building a causeway of sand across the Pentland Firth where, of course, the fierce currents wash away the sand just as fast as the fairies can build.

== See also ==
- The Real McCoy (disambiguation)
