= Loudon's Highlanders =

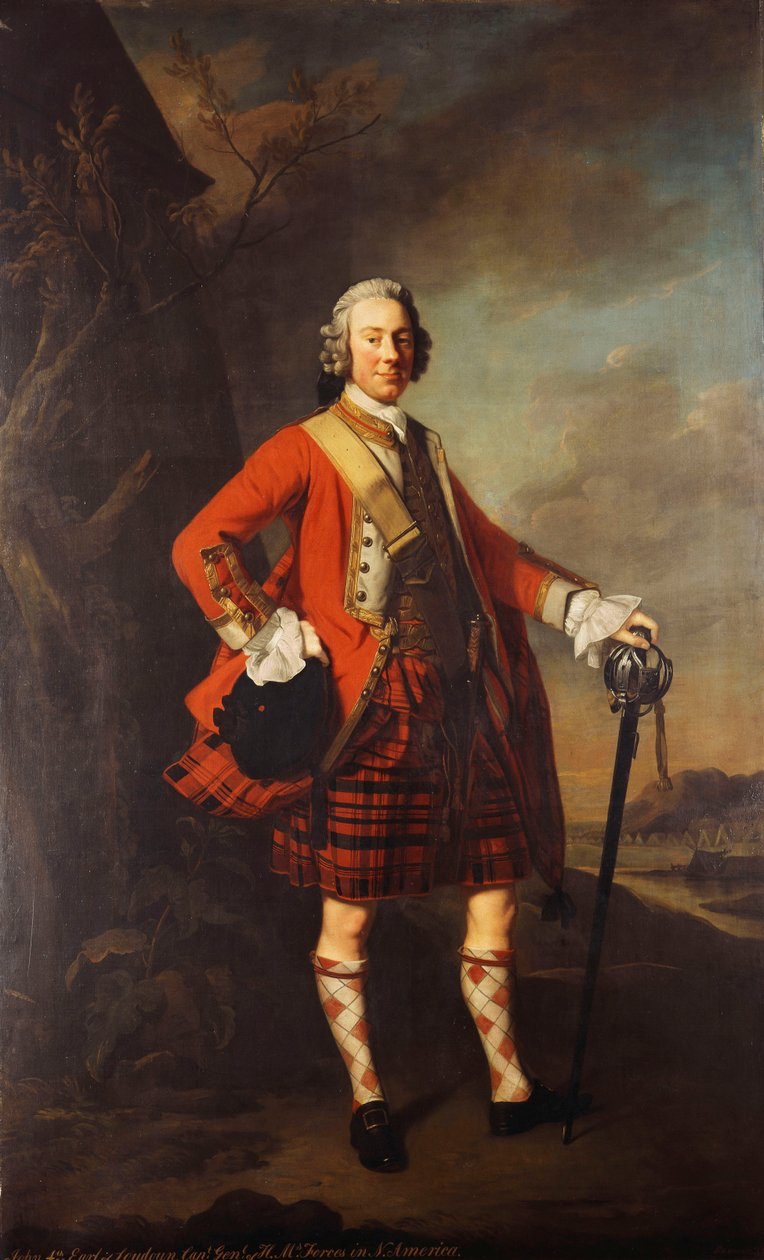
- 1747 portrait of the Earl of Loudoun as the regimental colonel
- Active: 1745–1748
- Country: Great Britain
- Branch: British Army
- Type: Line infantry
- Size: One battalion
- Engagements: Jacobite rising War of the Austrian Succession

Commanders
- Colonel of the Regiment: John Campbell, 4th Earl of Loudoun

Loudon's Highlanders (ranked as the 64th Regiment of Foot and also known as Earl of Loudon's Regiment of Foot) was a line infantry regiment of the British Army. Raised in 1745, it participated in the suppression of the Jacobite rising of 1745 before being disbanded in 1748.

== History ==
=== Formation ===
The great bravery of the 43rd Highlanders (later renumbered the 42nd) and the admirable service which they rendered at the Battle of Fontenoy in May 1745, made the Government anxious to avail themselves still further of the military qualities of the Highlanders. Authority, therefore, was given to John Campbell, 4th Earl of Loudoun to raise another Highland regiment under the patronage of the noblemen, chiefs, and gentlemen of that part of the kingdom, whose sons and connections would be appointed officers. The regiment was raised at Inverness and Perth in August 1745 and the Earl of Loudoun served as its colonel throughout its short life. By 8 June 1745, the regiment numbered 1,250 men who were formed into twelve companies. By August 1745, the regiment consisted of twenty companies of men. Loudon's regiment was an entirely different unit to the eighteen Independent Highland Companies with whom they are often confused, and which were raised by Duncan Forbes of Culloden starting in October 1745.

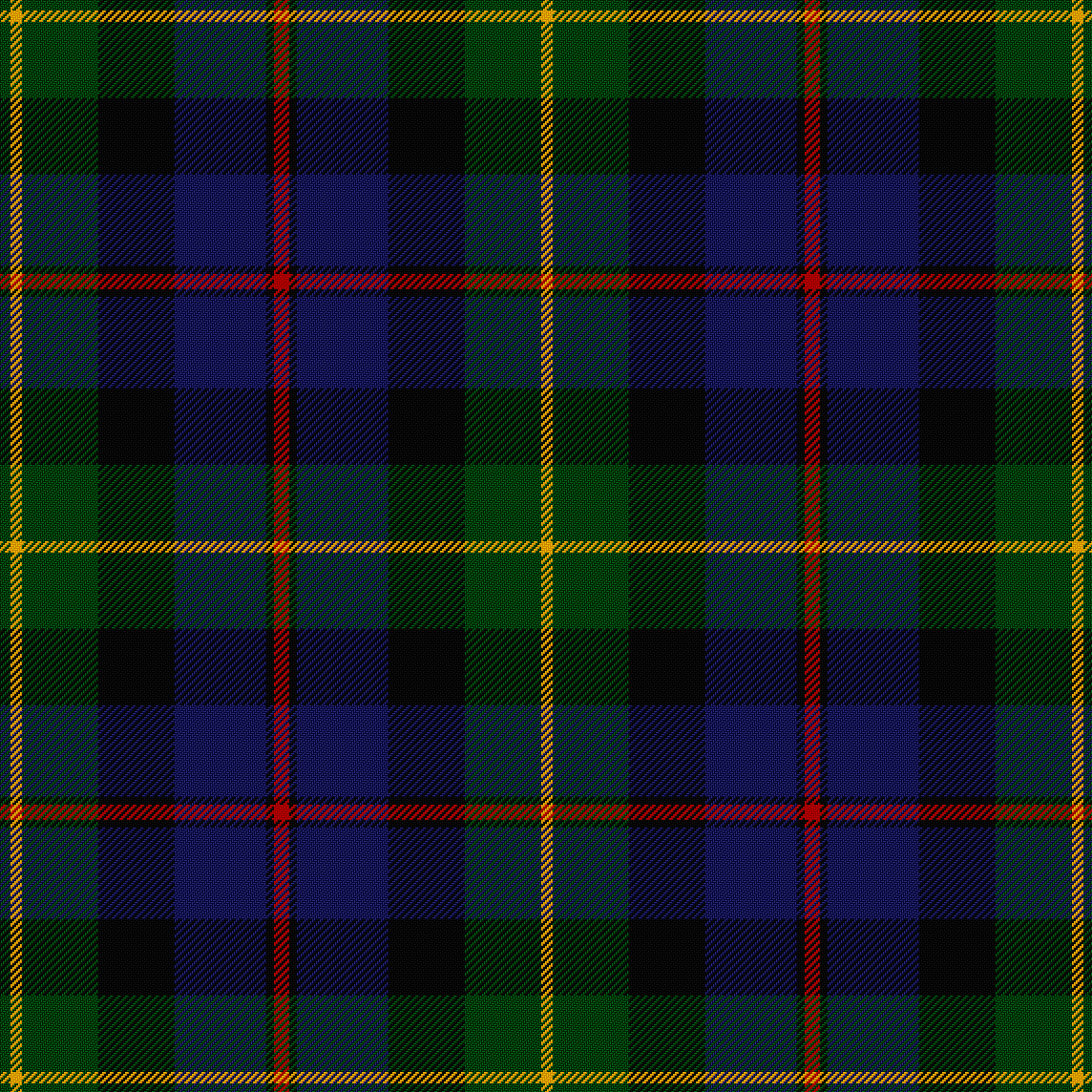
Tartan of the regiment

The regiment wore a uniform tartan which had checks of blue and green with thick black borders around the blue, like Black Watch, featuring over-checks of red (on blue) and yellow (on green), and lacking the two black "tram lines" of Black Watch. This general colour scheme of blue, green, and black appears to have been imposed across the regiments from on high; "Lord Loudoun tried hard to get a red tartan for his men almost until the time when the regiment was disbanded but he never succeeded." That was probably the red-and-black tartan illustrated in Loudoun's full-length 1747 portrait by Allan Ramsay, which is of a similar style to other red tartans in portraits of the era. (Note: J.&T. Dunbar (1979), working from a 1755 black-and-white engraving by J. Faber based on the painting, supposed that it illustrated the Loudoun's Highlanders regimental tartan, but this idea does not agree with Scarlett (1990)'s information that the unit never got a red tartan.)

=== Jacobite rising of 1745 ===
The regiment fought at the Battle of Prestonpans in September 1745, where they were defeated and many were taken prisoner, but later released. Three companies of Loudon's Highlanders fought for the British Government against the Jacobites at the Battle of Culloden in April 1746, where they were victorious, alongside one company of Highlanders from the 43rd Highlanders, otherwise known as the Black Watch. During the battle, Captain Campbell and six soldiers of the regiment were killed, with two more wounded. In the aftermath of Culloden, the regiment was involved in the search for the Jacobite leader, Charles Edward Stuart, and under Grant of Knockando, they nearly caught him at a hut at Torvault on 23 August 1746, but he managed to escape.

=== War of Austrian Succession ===
The regiment was ranked as the 64th Foot in 1747. It served at the siege of Bergen op Zoom where it distinguished itself and suffered over one thousand casualties out of a complement of 1,450. It was disbanded in 1748.

== Officers ==
Notable officers of the regiment included:

- Captain John Murray, son of Lord George Murray, in turn son of John Murray, 1st Duke of Atholl, chief of Clan Murray (never actually served).
- Captain Sir Harry Munro, 7th Baronet, son of Colonel Sir Robert Munro, 6th Baronet of Foulis, chief of Clan Munro.
- Captain Alexander Mackay, son of George Mackay, 3rd Lord Reay, chief of Clan Mackay.
- Captain Ewen Macpherson of Cluny, chief of Clan Macpherson (later joined the Jacobites).
- Captain John Sutherland of Forse, of Clan Sutherland.
- Lieutenant John Campbell, of Strachur, who died in 1806, a general in the army, and colonel of the 87th regiment.
- Lieutenant John Robertson or Reid, of Straloch, who died in 1806, at the age of eighty-five, a general in the army and colonel of the Connaught Rangers.

== See also ==
- Campbell of Argyll Militia
