= Battle of Littleferry =

Battle during the Jacobite rising in 1746, just before the Battle of Culloden

Coordinates: 57°57′37″N 4°0′11″W

- Part of the Jacobite rising of 1745
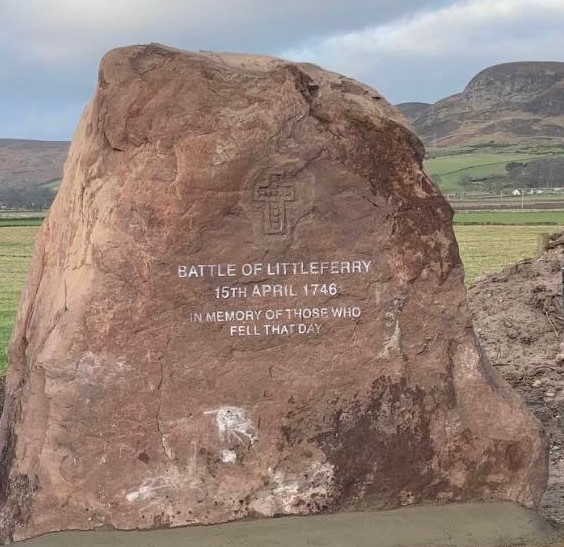
- Memorial to the Battle of Littleferry 1746 unveiled in April 2022
Date	15 April 1746
Location	Littleferry, Sutherland, Scotland grid reference NH8198
Result	British victory

Belligerents
(Kingdom of Great Britain) Great Britain; Two Independent Highland Companies drawn from: Clan Mackay; Clan Sutherland; Or three companies of Sutherland local militia	Jacobites drawn from: Clan Mackenzie; Clan MacGregor; Clan Mackinnon

Commanders and leaders
(Kingdom of Great Britain) Ensign John Mackay of Moudale; Or Ensign John Mackay from Golspie	George Mackenzie, 3rd Earl of Cromartie

Strength
200 men	300–500 men

Casualties and losses
<6–10 killed Estimated 20 wounded	100 killed 150 or 172 captured.

The Battle of Littleferry (also known as the Skirmish at Golspie) took place near Littleferry during the Jacobite rising in 1746, just before the Battle of Culloden. Scottish forces loyal to the Anglo-Hanoverian Government defeated a Scottish Jacobite force.

== Background ==
Following the Skirmish of Tongue, where a significant amount of money and urgent supplies had been captured from the Jacobites by forces under Captain Hugh Mackay, a strong force of Jacobites was sent north under the command of George Mackenzie, 3rd Earl of Cromartie to try to recover the supplies. This force arrived too late to be of any assistance to their allies, who had been captured at the Skirmish of Tongue.

William Sutherland, 17th Earl of Sutherland was loyal to the British-Hanoverian Government, but he had not raised and armed his clan quickly enough to take action against the Jacobite Charles Edward Stuart. This led to a suspicion in London that Sutherland might be disloyal. However, the Jacobites also questioned Sutherland's loyalty, and the Jacobite Earl of Cromartie was sent with 500 men against the Earl of Sutherland. Cromartie's force stormed Dunrobin Castle; the Earl of Sutherland narrowly escaped them through a back door of the castle.

== Opposing forces ==
=== Government force ===
According to accounts by Angus Mackay (1906) and Peter Simpson (1996), Cromartie and his men were attacked at Littleferry as they made their way south by two Independent Highland Companies, one from the Clan Sutherland and one from the Clan Mackay, led by Ensign John Mackay of Moudale. However, according to the account written in The Sutherland Book in 1892 by Sir William Fraser this was Ensign John Mackay of the Sutherland militia.

The semi-professional independent companies are often confused with the non-professional local militia companies who also supported the Government but who were less cohesively organized. According to Patrick Marriott writing in 2022, it was not Ensign John Mackay of Moudale of the independent company who led the attack at the Battle of Littleferry but Ensign John Mackay from Golspie, who was in one of the Sutherland local militia companies and whose identity has been obscured from history. Marriott also states that although key elements of the two independent companies were present on the Government side at the battle, most of the fighting for the Government was done by three Sutherland local militia companies. The first of these was of around 80 men, captained by Robert Macallister who was a senior factor for the Earl of Sutherland and whose lieutenant was Hector Munro of Novar and whose ensign was John Mackay from Golspie. The second was commanded by Lieutenant William Sutherland of Sciberscross and included around 70 men. The third included around 80–100 men and was captained by Robert Gray who was another factor to the Earl of Sutherland. The latter militia company also included a "good number" of the independent company men.

=== Jacobite force ===
Cromartie's Jacobite force consisted of about 300-500 men. This Jacobite force comprised some of their best fighting men; the MacGregors, Coll Macdonell of Barrisdale, the Clan Mackinnon and the Jacobite Mackenzies under George Mackenzie, 3rd Earl of Cromartie.

== Battle ==
The Earl of Cromartie and his force decided to march south to rejoin the main Jacobite force under Prince Charles at Inverness. Believing that all of Sutherland's followers had dispersed, the Jacobite officers had allowed their men to march ahead of them, confident that they, the officers on horseback, could quickly catch up with the marching men. However, there were still some Sutherland men in the hills above Dunrobin. Led by Ensign John Mackay, the Sutherland men came down from the hills near Golspie, attacking the gap between the rebel officers and their soldiers. Most of the Jacobite officers were captured; many of the men were killed, and the rest were driven onto the beach, where several were drowned trying to swim Loch Fleet. Most of Cromartie's men were either killed or taken prisoner and thus denied the Prince much needed reinforcements.

An account of the Battle of Littleferry was written by Angus Mackay in The Book of Mackay:

A few days before Culloden, Cromartie got orders to rejoin the Prince at Inverness with all his forces, but as he was marching towards the Little Ferry, Ensign John Mackay with a handful of men intrepidly attacked him. Mackay's boldness encouraged others of the Sutherland militia, who were in the hills near at hand, to take part in the affray, with the result that Cromartie was defeated and all his troops were either killed or captured. Mackay pistol in hand forced his way into Dunrobin Castle, into which Cromartie fled, and notwithstanding the efforts of the Countess of Sutherland, who was suspected of favouring the rebels and especially Cromartie, made a prisoner of the earl whom he found hiding under a bed.

== Casualties ==
According to Ruairidh MacLeod, historian of the Gaelic Society of Inverness, writing in 1984, the Jacobites lost about 100 dead in the battle. Patrick Marriott, of the Golspie Heritage Society, writing in 2022, estimated that the Government force lost up to ten dead and about twenty wounded. However, he also stated that one source states that the Government force lost less than six dead and that only two widows are recorded as receiving compensation in the tribunal that followed the battle.

== Aftermath and significance ==
Cromartie, who had been captured and detained at Dunrobin Castle, was put on a vessel that carried him to London. Cromartie, along with Lord Kilmarnock, Lord Lovat, and Lord Balmerino were all impeached of high treason, tried, and condemned. Cromartie was later pardoned, but the others were executed.

Despite this victory, some in the government in London were still inclined to associate the Sutherlands with the Cromartie rebels that they had defeated. The Earl of Sutherland spent several years before his death in 1750 attempting to obtain compensation from the government for the damage done to his estates by the rebels.

Angus Mackay writes in the Book of Mackay that the Battle of Littleferry was more significant than is generally realized, as Cromartie's Jacobite force would have provided much-needed help to the Jacobites at the Battle of Culloden and was prevented from doing so. However, according to Tony Pollard, Cromartie's force would have been late for the battle at Culloden anyway.

After the battle the Earl of Cromartie handed over a chest containing about £900 which was used as prize money. A tribunal was set up by the Earl of Sutherland and money was awarded as follows: Captain Macallister received £70, Captain Gray received £70, Lieutenant Sutherland received £45 (which included funds for the parish of Clyne), Lieutenant (or Ensign) Hector Munro received £35, Ensign John Mackay received £50 for having made the initial attack and for securing the money, the men who made the attack in the Culmaily part of the battle received £264, Lieutenant John Mackay of Torrdaroch and Sergeant William Mackay each received £35 as they were volunteers from the independent companies. At the surrender, Cromartie also handed over two silver pistols to Lieutenant Hector Munro.

== Memorial ==
In April 2022, a memorial stone was unveiled at the site of the Battle of Littleferry in memory of those who died on both sides in the battle. The unveiling ceremony was attended by Ronald Munro Fergusson who is a descendant of Lieutenant Hector Munro of Novar who was in the Golspie militia on the Government side at the battle and by Margaret Openshaw who is a descendant of Ensign George Mackenzie who was in the Earl of Cromartie's force at the battle.

=== Pipe music ===
In 2022, a Highland bagpipes tune was composed to commemorate the battle by the Sutherland Schools Pipe Band who performed it at the unveiling of the memorial.

== Gallery ==
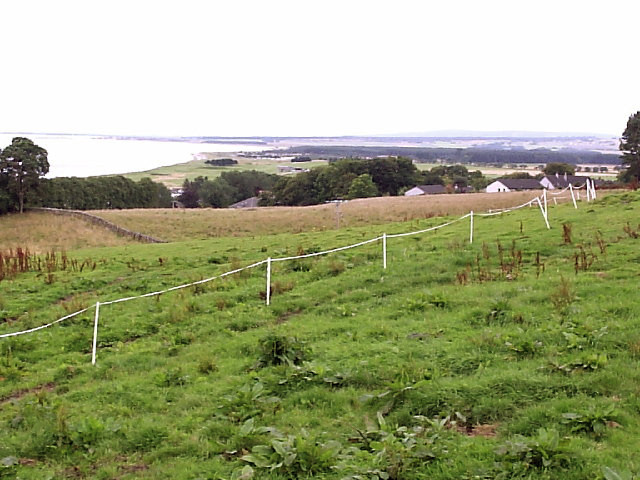
View from Rhives above Golspie looking south across the battlefield towards Littleferry and Loch Fleet

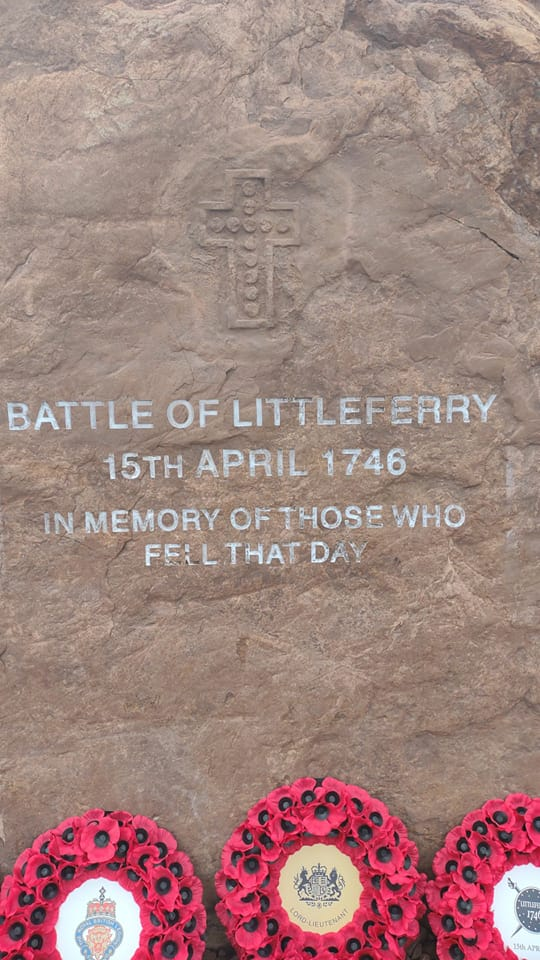
Memorial to the Battle of Littleferry 1746 unveiled in April 2022 with wreaths laid by the Royal British Legion Golspie branch and the Lord Lieutenant of Sutherland
