= George Mackay of Skibo =

Scottish lawyer, soldier and politician

George Mackay of Skibo (c. 1715 – 25 June 1782) was a Scottish lawyer, soldier and politician. He fought for the British Government during the Jacobite rising of 1745 and was later a Member of Parliament.

== Early life ==
Mackay was a younger son of George Mackay, 3rd Lord Reay and his third wife Mary Dowell. He was educated at the University of Aberdeen and became an advocate in 1737.

== Jacobite rising of 1745 ==
The Clan Mackay supported the British Government during the Jacobite rising of 1745. George Mackay was Captain of the 1st Mackay Independent Highland Company that was raised by Duncan Forbes, Lord Culloden to oppose the Jacobites. George Mackay took an active part in the Skirmish of Tongue in March 1746 when money and supplies that were destined for the Jacobites were captured from a French ship. He also led his independent company in the Raids on Lochaber and Shiramore. This led to a commission in the regular British Army, from which he retired in 1748.

== Member of Parliament ==
He was elected at the 1747 general election as the Member of Parliament (MP) for Sutherland, having unsuccessfully contested the seat in 1741. He was re-elected in 1754, and held the seat until 1761, when his younger brother Alexander was elected in his place.

In 1756, he was appointed Master of the Mint for Scotland in 1756.

== Skibo Castle ==
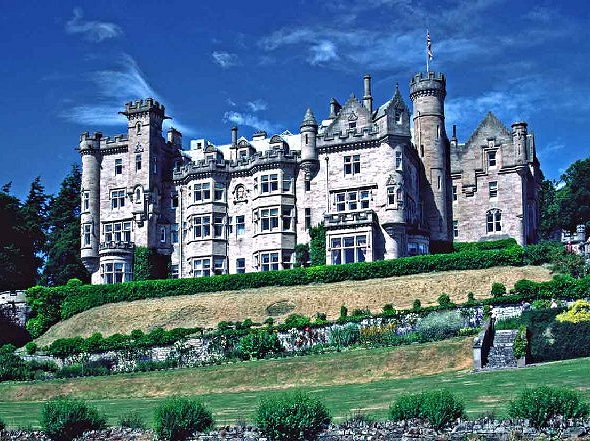
Skibo Castle in modern times

George Mackay came into possession of Skibo Castle through his maternal uncle, Patrick Doull of Winterfield. However it was already heavily burdened and continued that way while under Mackay's ownership but he later disposed of the property.

== Family ==
George Mackay married Anne Sutherland, daughter of Eric Sutherland, 4th Lord Duffus on 13 September 1766. They had the following children:

1. George Mackay (died in the East Indies in 1790).
2. Eric Mackay, 7th Lord Reay.
3. Alexander Mackay, 8th Lord Reay.
4. Donald Mackay (a Captain in the Royal Navy).
5. Patrick Mackay (died in infancy).
6. Elizabeth Mackay.
7. Mary Mackay.
8. Harriet Mackay.
9. Anne Mackay, married with Edward Hart, shipowner of Birmingham..

== Independent Company ==
The names of the men in George Mackay's Independent Highland Company during the Jacobite rising of 1745 were:

- Hugh Mackay (younger of Bighouse) (Lieutenant)
- Aneas Mackay (Ensign)
- William Mackay (Sergeant)
- Hugh Mackay (Sergeant)
- Donald Morison (Sergeant)
- Alexander Morison (Sergeant)
- Hugh Mackay (Corporal)
- Hugh Mackay (Corporal)
- William Morison (Corporal)
- John Polsone (Corporal)
- George MacLeod (Drummer and Piper)
- John Mackay (Drummer and Piper)
- John Aningtown (centinel)
- Alexander Beaton (centinel)
- Donald Forbes (centinel)
- Donald Fraser (centinel)
- Alexander Gun (centinel)
- Donald Gun (centinel)
- Andrew Gray (centinel)
- Robert Lebby (centinel)
- George Leith (centinel)
- Angus Mackay (centinel) (in Kylestrome)
- William Mackay (centinel) (in Kylestrome)
- Alexander Mackay (centinel) (in Glencoll)
- Hugh Mackay (centinel) (in Maldy)
- Donald Mackay (centinel) (in Skerray)
- Hugh Mackay (centinel) (in Huinleam)
- Donald Mackay (centinel) (in Eribol)
- George Mackay (centinel) (in Tongue)
- John Mackay (centinel) (in Kylestrome)
- Hugh Mackay (centinel) (in Ardachow)
- Finlay Mackay (centinel)
- Murdoch Mackay (centinel) (in Failliskard)
- William Mackay (centinel) (in Ardbeag)
- William Mackay (centinel) (in Skerray)
- Hector Mackay (centinel) (in Island Roan)
- Alexander Mackay (centinel) (in Borgie)
- John Mackay (centinel) (in Strathskerray)
- William Mackay (centinel) (in Torisdale)
- Neil Mackay (centinel) (in Borgie)
- Hugh Mackay (centinel) (in Brae Tongue)
- James Mackay (centinel) (in Torisdale)
- Donald Mackay (centinel) (in Sandwood)
- Hugh Mackay (centinel) (in Eribol)
- William Mackay (centinel) (in Farr)
- Hector Mackay (centinel) (in Scrabster)
- Donald Mackay (centinel) (in Oldshours)
- William Mackay (centinel) (in Mussol)
- James Mackay (centinel) (in Hopes)
- John Mackay (centinel) (in Strathmore)
- Hugh Mackay (centinel) (in Oldshoremore)
- Hugh Mackay (centinel) (in Oldshorebeagg)
- Murdoch Mackay (centinel) (in Scale)
- Donald Mackay (centinel) (in Strathmore)
- John Mackay (centinel) (in Eribol)
- Donald Mackay (centinel) (in Baddveoir)
- Donald Mackay (centinel) (in Durin)
- Charles Mackay (centinel)
- George Mackay (centinel) (in Sleisdaridh)
- Alexander Mackay (centinel) (in Cloionell)
- Alexander Mackay (centinel) (in Strathmelness)
- Roderick Mackay (centinel)
- Murdoch Mackay (centinel) (in Eriboll)
- Alexander Mackay (centinel) (in Farr)
- John MacLeod (centinel)
- Donald MacLeod (centinel) (in Tongue)
- Donald MacLeod (centinel) (in Arduchow)
- Angus MacLeod (centinel)
- William MacLeod (centinel)
- Hector MacLeod (centinel)
- Norman MacLeod (centinel) (in Strathmelness)
- Norman MacLeod (centinel) (in Sky)
- Alexander Mackenzie (centinel) (in Achfary)
- Alexander Mackenzie (centinel)(in Borgie)
- William Mackenzie (centinel) (in Rians)
- John Mackenzie (centinel)
- Hugh MacIntosh (centinel) (in Kylestrome)
- Hugh MacIntosh (centinel) (in Eribole)
- Hugh MacIntosh (centinel) (in Durness)
- Alexander MacIntosh (centinel)
- George MacIntosh (centinel)
- Donald McPhadrick (centinel)
- Donald MacLean (centinel)
- Hugh Morsion (centinel)
- William Morison (Elder) (centinel)
- William Morison (Younger) (centinel)
- Thomas Morison (centinel)
- Angus Morison (centinel)
- Donald Morison (centinel)
- Neil Morison (centinel)
- Neil Matheson (centinel)
- Donald Munro (centinel) (in Ribbigill)
- Donald Munro (centinel) (in Farr)
- Hugh Munro (centinel)
- Alexander Munro (centinel)
- William Munro (centinel)
- William Murray (centinel)
- William Ross (centinel) (in Crech)
- William Ross (Elder) (centinel)
- William Ross (Younger) (centinel)
- Lachlin Ross (centinel)
- Donald Ross (centinel)
- Hector Ross (centinel)
- David Ross (centinel)
- John Ross (centinel)
- Kenneth Sutherland (centinel)

== Bibliography ==
- Mackay, Angus, M.A. (1906). The Book of Mackay. (St Andrews University).
- MacLeod, Ruairidh. F.S.A. Scot. (1984). Transactions of the Gaelic Society of Inverness. Volume LIII.
- Simpson, Peter. (1996). The Independent Highland Companies, 1603 - 1760. ISBN 0-85976-432-X.

Parliament of Great Britain
Preceded by Hon. James St Clair	Member of Parliament for Sutherland; 1747–1761	Succeeded by Hon. Alexander Mackay
