= John Campbell, 4th Earl of Loudoun =

British Army officer (1705–1782)

General The Right Honourable The Earl of Loudoun FRS
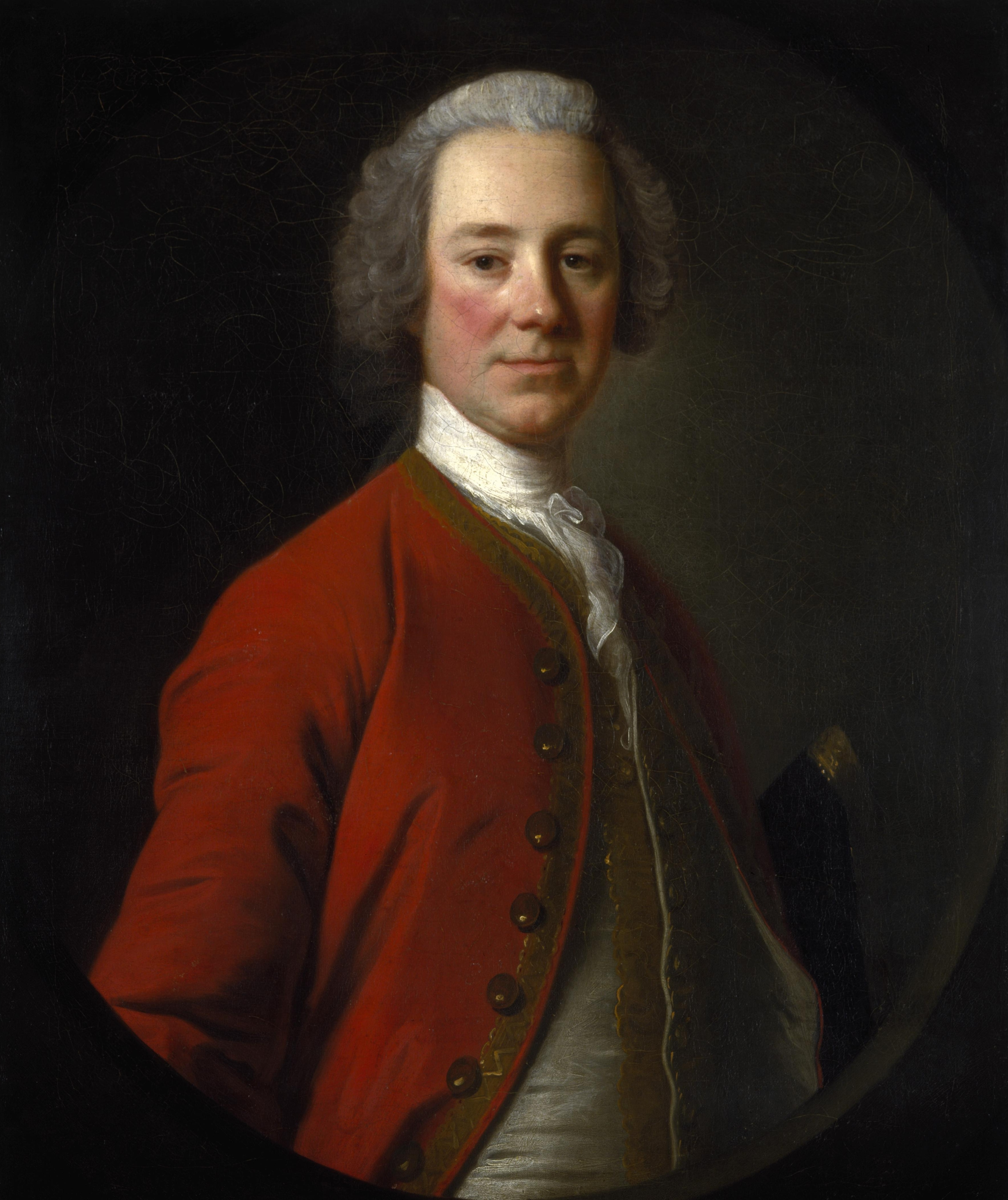
- Portrait by Allan Ramsay, c. 1747
- Born: 5 May 1705; Scotland
- Died: 27 April 1782 (aged 76); Great Britain
- Military career
- Allegiance: Great Britain
- Branch: British Army
- Service years: 1727–1782
- Rank: General
- Commands: Loudon's Highlanders
- Conflicts: Jacobite rising of 1745; Raids on Lochaber and Shiramore; Seven Years' War; French and Indian War; Spanish invasion of Portugal (1762)

General John Campbell, 4th Earl of Loudoun (5 May 1705 – 27 April 1782) was a British Army officer who served as Commander-in-Chief, North America from 1756 to 1757.

== Early life ==
Born in Scotland two years before the creation of Great Britain in which his father, Hugh Campbell, 3rd Earl of Loudoun, was a significant figure, Campbell enlisted in the British Army as a cornet in 1727 and inherited his father's estates and peerages in 1731, becoming Lord Loudoun. He raised a Highland regiment known as Loudon's Highlanders, which took part in the suppression of the Jacobite rising of 1745. The regiment consisted of twelve companies, with Loudoun as colonel and John Campbell as lieutenant colonel. The regiment served in several different parts of Scotland. Three of the regiment's companies, raised in the Scottish Lowlands, were captured by the Jacobite Army at the Battle of Prestonpans.

Eight companies, under Loudoun's personal command, were stationed in Inverness. Loudoun set out in February 1746 with that portion of his regiment and several Independent Highland Companies in an attempt to capture the Jacobite Army's commander-in-chief, Charles Edward Stuart. The expedition was met by a ruse of war by only four Jacobites, which suggested a large Jacobite force was protecting Stuart, and Loudoun returned to Inverness without engagement. That was later publicised as the Rout of Moy. Loudoun then fell back to join the Duke of Cumberland's army up and gave up the town of Inverness to the rebels. After the Battle of Culloden, Loudoun led his mixed force of regulars, militia and Highlanders in mopping-up operations against the remaining rebels.

== Seven Years' War ==
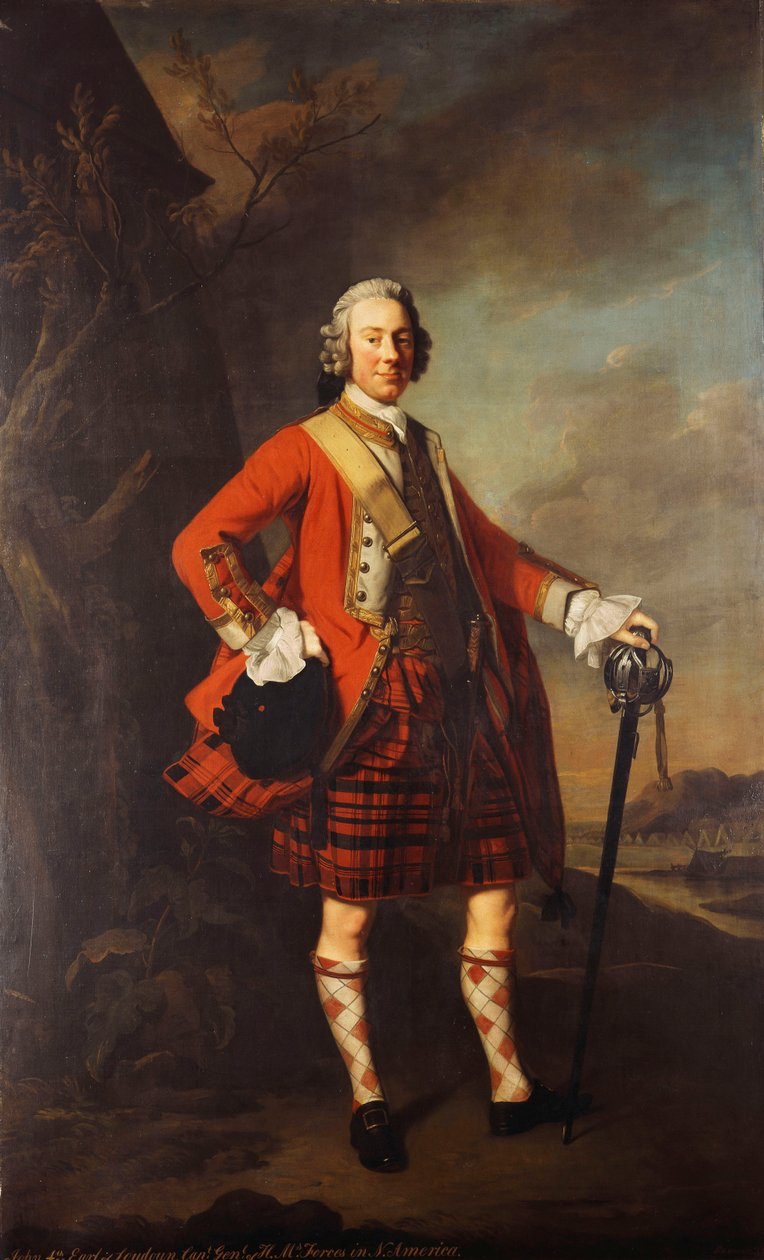
1747 portrait of Loudon by Allan Ramsay

=== North America ===
In 1756, Loudoun was sent to North America as Commander-in-Chief and Governor General of Virginia, where he was unpopular with many of the colonial leaders. When he learned that some colonial merchants were still trading with the French while he was trying to fight a war against them, he temporarily closed all American ports. Despite his unpopularity the County of Loudoun, formed from Fairfax in 1757, was named in his honour.

As Commander-in-Chief during the Seven Years' War, called the French and Indian War in the Thirteen Colonies, he planned an expedition to seize Louisbourg from the French in 1757 but he called it off when intelligence, possibly including a French deception, indicated that the French forces there were too strong for him to defeat. While Loudoun was thus engaged in Canada, French forces captured Fort William Henry from the British, and he was replaced by James Abercrombie and returned to London. Francis Parkman, a 19th-century historian of the Seven Years' War, rates Loudun's martial conduct of the affair poorly.

Many historians debate whether he played a fundamental part in the Seven Years' War. Arguably, he was an influential figure as he embarked on reforms for the army such as replacing the ordinary musket with the flintlock musket for greater accuracy. He made improvements by embarking on a road improvement programme and recognised the need to supply the army as he replaced the traditional supply line with army wagons. His focus was centralising the system of supplies and had built storehouses in Halifax and Albany and recognised the importance of waterways as a means of transport. Most notably, he integrated regular troops with local militias, and the irregulars were to fight a different kind of war from the linear European style of warfare in which the British had previously been trained.

=== Benjamin Franklin's anecdotes of Lord Loudon ===
Benjamin Franklin provides several first-hand anecdotes of Loudon's North American days in his Autobiography, none of which are complimentary. The following are excerpts:

(Loudon) set out for New York before me; and, as the time for dispatching the packet-boats was at his disposition, and there were two then remaining there, one of which, he said, was to sail very soon, I requested to know the precise time, that I might not miss her by any delay of mine. His answer was, "I have given out that she is to sail on Saturday next; but I may let you know, entre nous, that if you are there by Monday morning, you will be in time, but do not delay longer." By some accidental hindrance at a ferry, it was Monday noon before I arrived, and I was much afraid she might have sailed, as the wind was fair; but I was soon made easy by the information that she was still in the harbor, and would not move till the next day. One would imagine that I was now on the very point of departing for Europe. I thought so; but I was not then so well acquainted with his lordship's character, of which indecision was one of the strongest features. I shall give some instances. It was about the beginning of April that I came to New York, and I think it was near the end of June before we sail'd. There were then two of the packet-boats, which had been long in port, but were detained for the general's letters, which were always to be ready to-morrow. Another packet arriv'd; she too was detain'd; and, before we sail'd, a fourth was expected. Ours was the first to be dispatch'd, as having been there longest. Passengers were engaged in all, and some extremely impatient to be gone, and the merchants uneasy about their letters, and the orders they had given for insurance (it being war time) for fall goods; but their anxiety avail'd nothing; his lordship's letters were not ready; and yet whoever waited on him found him always at his desk, pen in hand, and concluded he must needs write abundantly.

Going myself one morning to pay my respects, I found in his antechamber one Innis, a messenger of Philadelphia, who had come from thence express with a packet from Governor Denny for the general. He delivered to me some letters from my friends there, which occasion'd my inquiring when he was to return, and where he lodg'd, that I might send some letters by him. He told me he was order'd to call to-morrow at nine for the general's answer to the governor, and should set off immediately. I put my letters into his hands the same day. A fortnight after I met him again in the same place. "So, you are soon return'd, Innis?" "Return'd! no, I am not gone yet." "How so?" "I have called here by order every morning these two weeks past for his lordship's letter, and it is not yet ready." "Is it possible, when he is so great a writer? for I see him constantly at his escritoire." "Yes," says Innis, "but he is like St. George on the signs, always on horseback, and never rides on."...

This daily expectation of sailing, and all the three packets going down to Sandy Hook, to join the fleet there, the passengers thought it best to be on board, lest by a sudden order the ships should sail, and they be left behind. There, if I remember right, we were about six weeks, consuming our sea-stores, and oblig'd to procure more. At length the fleet sail'd, the general and all his army on board, bound to Louisburg, with the intent to besiege and take that fortress; all the packet-boats in company ordered to attend the general's ship, ready to receive his dispatches when they should be ready. We were out five days before we got a letter with leave to part, and then our ship quitted the fleet and steered for England. The other two packets he still detained, carried them with him to Halifax, where he stayed some time to exercise the men in sham attacks upon sham forts, then altered his mind as to besieging Louisburg, and returned to New York, with all his troops, together with the two packets above mentioned, and all their passengers! During his absence the French and savages had taken Fort George, on the frontier of that province, and the savages had massacred many of the garrison after capitulation....

On the whole, I wonder'd much how such a man came to be intrusted with so important a business as the conduct of a great army; but, having since seen more of the great world, and the means of obtaining, and motives for giving places, my wonder is diminished.

=== Portugal ===
In 1762, he was sent to Portugal to counter the Spanish invasion of Portugal as second in command, and he became overall commander in 1763. Despite being unable to prevent the loss of Almeida, the British forces soon launched a counter-attack that drove the Franco-Spanish invaders back across the border.

== Later life ==
Back in Scotland, Loudon in 1763 was made Governor of Edinburgh Castle, a post that he held for the rest of his life. In 1770, he was promoted to general. Loudoun's interest in horticulture led to his estate being renowned for its landscaping. He collected willow species in particular from around the globe. On 23 January 1773, the town of Loudon, New Hampshire, was incorporated and named in his honor. Loudonville, New York, was also named after him as well as the unincorporated town of Loudon, Massachusetts, which was renamed to Otis upon its incorporation. Campbell remained a bachelor and on his death on 27 April 1782 was succeeded as earl by his cousin, James Mure-Campbell.

== Coat of arms ==
Coat of arms of John Campbell, 4th Earl of Loudoun
Coronet A coronet of an Earl Crest An eagle with two necks displayed gules in a flame of fire proper. Escutcheon Gyronny of eight ermine and gules. Supporters Dexter: an armed man bearing a pick on his shoulder proper; Sinister: a lady richly attired with a signet letter in her sinister hand proper. Motto l byde my tyme

== See also ==
- Loudoun
- Fort Loudoun (Tennessee)
- Loudonville, New York
- Loudon, New Hampshire
- Loudoun County, Virginia

Masonic offices
Preceded by The Viscount Weymouth	Grand Master of the Premier Grand Lodge of England; 1736–1737	Succeeded by The Earl of Darnley
Military offices
Preceded by William Shirley	Commander-in-Chief, North America; 1756–1757	Succeeded by James Abercrombie
Preceded by Humphrey Bland	Governor of Edinburgh Castle; 1763–1782	Succeeded by The Earl of Eglinton
Preceded by The Duke of Gloucester and Edinburgh	Colonel of the 3rd Regiment of Foot Guards; 1770–1782	Succeeded by The Duke of Argyll
Peerage of Scotland
Preceded by Hugh Campbell	Earl of Loudoun; 1731–1782	Succeeded by James Mure-Campbell
