= Independent Highland Companies =

Scottish militia units

The Independent Highland Companies were irregular militia raised from the Scottish clans of the Scottish Highlands by order of the Scottish (later British) government between 1603 and 1760 in order to help keep the peace and enforce the law in the Highlands and were recognized as such by the government. The officers of the Independent Highland Companies were commissioned as officers of the British Army but the independent companies were not recognized as official regiments of the line of the army. The Independent Highland Companies were the progenitors of the Highland Regiments of the British Army that began when ten Independent Highland Companies were embodied to form the Earl of Crawford's Highland Regiment that was numbered the 43rd Regiment of Foot in 1739.

== Early independent companies ==
The first independent companies are generally regarded to have been formed after the Union of the Crowns in 1603 when James VI of Scotland became James I of England. It was thought that firm rule from the centre was the only answer to the state of lawlessness that existed in the Highlands. The first policing company was known as the "King's Guard" and consisted only of mounted troops and performed a variety of tasks connected with keeping the law. The first of two notable actions carried out by the King's Guard was in 1605 when they were used in Lord Scone’s expedition to the Western Isles in order to bring in some order and to bring the local chiefs to heel in terms of tax payment. After further futile attempts by James to pacify the Highlands the King's Guard was used once more this time in 1608 led by Andrew Stewart, Lord Ochiltree and Andrew Knox, Bishop of the Isles in an attempt to obtain effective guarantees backed by royal authority.

In 1624, a meeting of the Privy Council of Scotland was called which included 36 landlord clan chiefs along with 21 members of the Privy Council in order to discuss troubles caused by the Clan Gregor such as cattle lifting, kidnapping and general mayhem that was taking place. The outcome of the meeting was to elect two Highland Captaincies from a number of contenders. The two elected were both Stewarts as were the commanders of the earlier King's Guard. The appointment of paid and professional soldiers was a major change in trying to control the law and was continued after the death of King James in 1625. During this early period up to the restoration of Charles II of England in 1660 was when most of the great Highland robbers were active. The activities of the Independent Companies was then considered of little significance when compared with the battles and extraordinary feats of the forces under James Graham, 1st Marquis of Montrose during the Scottish Civil War in 1644–1645. Even before the restoration of 1660 the Cromwellians under General George Monk had to resort to local clan watches to try and resolve situations. For example, even the Clan Cameron who had been the most staunch supporters of the Stewarts formed an Independent Company to help General Monk subdue the Clan MacDonell of Glengarry.

== The restoration period ==
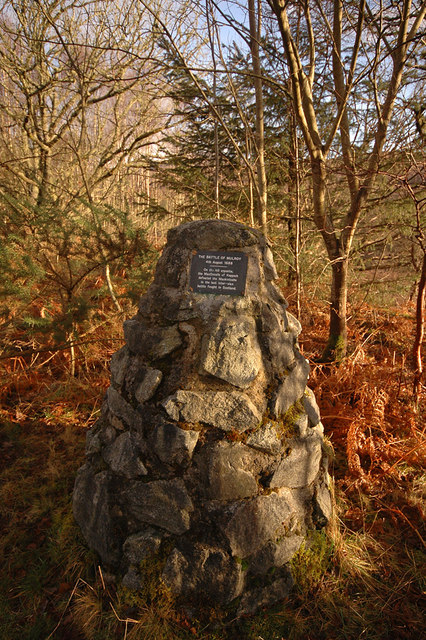
Cairn marking the site of the Battle of Mulroy where Kenneth Mackenzie of Suddie was killed leading his Independent Highland Company

After the restoration King Charles II raised several Independent Highland Companies. In 1666 he allowed the Earl of Argyll to raise a company or "watch" of 60 men for one year for the purpose of guarding his territory. In the following year Charles gave a warrant to the Earl of Atholl to raise a force of Highlanders to keep the peace in the Highlands and to "keep watch upon the braes". Over the next 70 years a number of Independent Highland Companies were raised and then disbanded as was the demand by the political and military situation. Some of the commanders such as the Earl of Argyll and the Earl of Caithness used the companies almost exclusively for their own needs. Charles later decided that he could not afford to maintain these two Independent Companies and that they should be disbanded. They were in fact added to the Earl of Mar’s regular regiment, the 21st foot (which later became the Royal Scots Fusiliers). These two companies now under the Earl of Mar’s regiment were captained by Kenneth Mackenzie of Suddie and Alexander Cairnes. Kenneth Mackenzie of Suddie was later killed whilst leading his Independent Company of government troops by order of the Privy Council at the Battle of Mulroy in 1688 in support of the chief of Clan Mackintosh against the Clan MacDonald of Keppoch and the Clan Cameron. Following on from Mulroy, King James II of England (VII of Scotland) made a decision to secure peace throughout both the Scottish Highlands and Scottish Lowlands. The main chiefs were asked to supply a certain number of men each and their composition is given in the following table.

Commander	Soldiers	Lieutenants	Ensigns	Sergeants	Pipers
John Murray 2nd Earl of Atholl	200	4	4	8	4
James Drummond, 4th Earl of Perth	50	1	1	2	1
Laird of Weem (Clan Menzies)	50	1	1	2	1
Laird of Gairntullie (Stuart)	50	1	1	1	1
John Campbell, 1st Earl of Breadalbane and Holland	100	2	2	4	2
Clan Robertson and Clan MacFarlane	48	1	1	2	1
James Graham, 4th Marquess of Montrose	20	1	-	1	-
William Graham, 8th Earl of Menteith	50	-	1	1	1
Alexander Stuart, 5th Earl of Moray	25	-	1	-	-
Earl of Mar	100	1	1	2	1
George Gordon, 1st Duke of Gordon	(unknown)	-	-	-	-
Colonel Patricke Grahame	(unknown)	-	-	-	-

The period between the restoration of Charles II in 1660 and the Glorious Revolution of 1688 was amongst the most unruly and unlawful in the history of the Scottish Highlands. Many men lost land that they had previously farmed and if they were not accepted into another clan they were forced into a life of crime, including robbery and violence. There is no doubt that the Independent Companies helped to maintain order but they were never fully backed by the Privy Council. The Council tended to switch between using the Independent Companies and the clans themselves. The companies were not numerous enough and did not have enough men in each company to deal with the fierce inter-clan rivalries. A start had been made in having paid troops, in local dress, speaking the same language as the native clansmen and who were keeping the peace to some extent.

== The revolution period ==
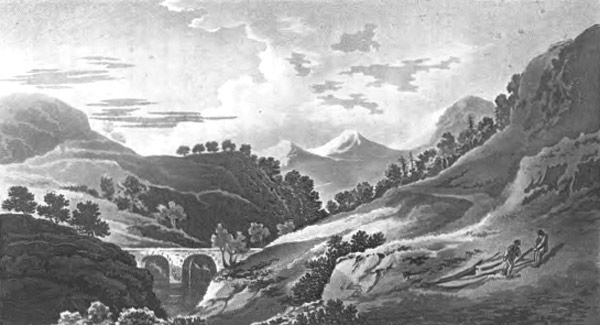
The pass of Killiecrankie. An Independent Highland Company from the Clan Menzies fought at the Battle of Killiecrankie in 1689, but did not become an accredited Independent Company until 26 days after the battle when William III sent the Menzies chief a commission after hearing of his coolness and bravery at the battle.

Scotland followed England in dethroning King James II (VII of Scotland) and replacing him with William III of Orange, whose wife was a Stuart princess, in what was known as the Glorious Revolution of 1688. A Jacobite rising in favour of James broke out in 1689 led by John Graham, 1st Viscount Dundee who had scraped together an army of 1000 men, mainly from the Highland clans such as Clan Cameron, Clan MacGregor, Clan MacDonald of Keppoch, Clan MacDonald of Sleat, Clan MacDonald of Clanranald, MacDonald of Glencoe, Clan MacLean and the Clan MacNeacail. He was opposed by General Hugh Mackay who was himself a Highlander and a Gaelic speaker. Mackay had gained considerable military experience on the continent in the Scots Brigade in Dutch Service. Mackay's force consisted of one battalion from each of the three regiments of the Dutch Brigade as well as Hasting's Leven's regiment which later became the 25th Regiment of Foot and then renamed the King's Own Scottish Borderers. Aside from these regular troops Mackay also had the support of an Independent Highland Company from the Clan Menzies which was led by their clan chief, Captain Robert Menzies. In the ensuing Battle of Killiecrankie, Mackay's forces were defeated and there are various reasons and accounts given to this by different historians. The Menzies Independent Company was later present at the Battle of Cromdale in 1690 where the Jacobites were defeated.

Troops from England and the Scottish Lowlands did not like serving in the Scottish Highlands and in view of this five Independent Highland Companies were raised over a twenty-month period from February 1691. The first of which began mustering in February of that year was commanded by Major George Munro, 1st of Newmore and included two lieutenants, one ensign, six non-commissioned officers and 100 sentinals. The second company was commanded by Major George Wishart and also included 100 sentinals. His lieutenant was Alexander Ross. The third company was commanded by Lieutenant-Colonel Robert Lumsdaine. The fourth was commanded by Hugh Mackaye and the fifth by Archibald Murray. These companies were used until 1694 and were attached to regular units.

== 18th century ==
At the beginning of the 18th century, there was a split within the clan system. Some clans had Jacobite tendencies while others favoured "Whig" principles and supported the Government. Lawlessness was still a problem, with many clans believing that it was quite righteous to steal or to "drive a spreaigh". Many chiefs had the spirit of adventure and saw it as excellent training for more war-like activities. Due to poor harvests, crime sometimes went beyond the normal cattle rustling, and people were killed or kidnapped for money and attacks were made on large houses. As a result, in 1701, two Independent Highland Companies were formed; one from Clan Campbell, commanded by Captain Alexander Campbell of Fonab and the other from Clan Grant, commanded by Captain William Grant. Both companies were ordered to assist the courts of justice in preventing thefts and to apprehend guilty persons. The Independent Companies were not numerous enough in terms of men and patrols to be effective in monitoring and controlling widespread trouble. Seeing this problem, the Earl of Tullibardine offered to raise a company of 800 men but said that he would not let anyone by the name of Campbell serve in it and as a result his offer was turned down. A third company of just over 50 men was eventually raised in 1704, commanded by Duncan Mackenzie. The three companies are recorded on the army strength from 1705 up until 1707, when the Acts of Union 1707 was passed. However, the acts had little effect on how the companies were paid, and they continued to form some defence against lawlessness and in preventing others from joining the Jacobite cause. King William died in 1702 which evoked much political turmoil with France and James Francis Edward Stuart’s claim for the British throne. In the meantime, the Independent Highland Companies were kept busy trying to stop cattle lifting on a mass scale. In 1708, Fraser, Lord Lovat, claimed that the companies had managed to control most of the robbery. In 1707, the Grant Independent Company was ordered to watch the north-east coast for James's expected landing but that did not take place so they returned to their normal duties of law-keeping in the Highland areas.

=== Jacobite rising of 1715 ===
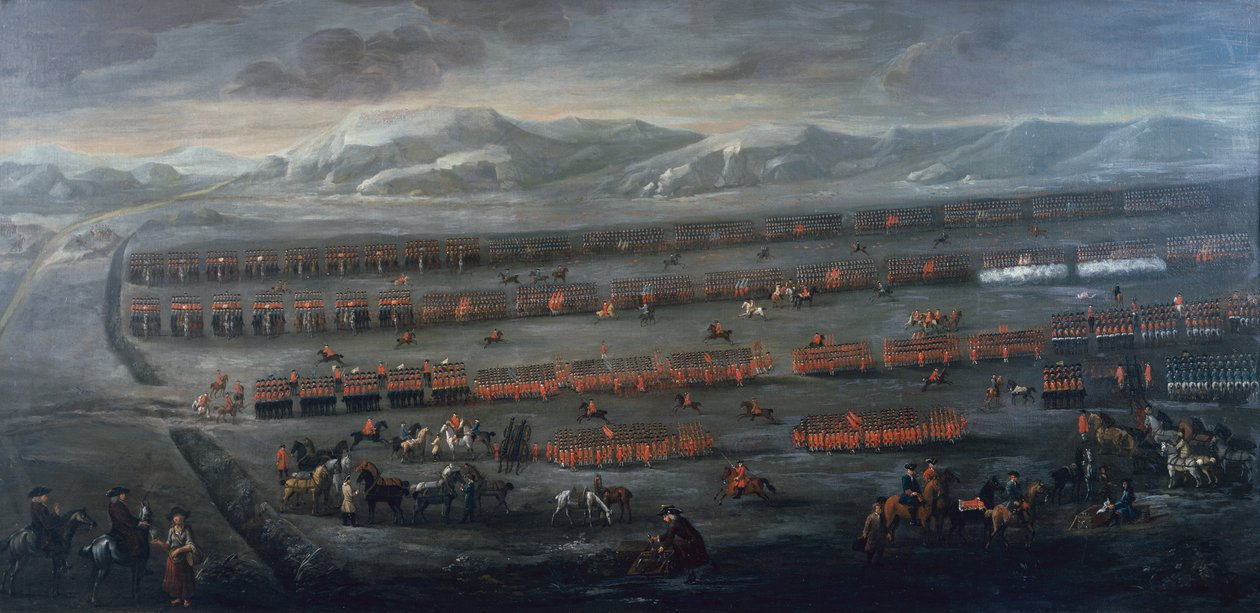
The Battle of Sheriffmuir, which Independent Highland Companies fought in

By 1715, the names of the commanders of the three Independent Highland Companies were recorded as Colonels Campbell, Grant, and Munro (Colonel Munro having replaced Duncan Mackenzie). It is not known exactly how the Independent Companies featured in the rising of 1715; however, there are unsubstantiated reports that a portion of the Grant and Munro companies actually fought at the Battle of Sheriffmuir. It is clear, however, that the Independent Companies played an active part before and after the battle. Colonel Sir Robert Munro, 6th Baronet was for a time governor of Inverness, and forced the rebel Mackenzies to give up their arms at Brahan Castle. Munro along with parties of Grants, Rosses, and Mackays also forced the surrender of the Earl of Seaforth. Colonel Grant played a lesser role; he established a garrison at Brahan and captured Gordon Castle, holding it until he was relieved by regular troops. Colonel Sir Robert Munro along with his younger brother Captain George Munro of Culcairn also accepted arms given up at Blair Atholl, while the Grant company disarmed clansmen at Ruthven in Badenoch.

=== Jacobite rising of 1719 ===
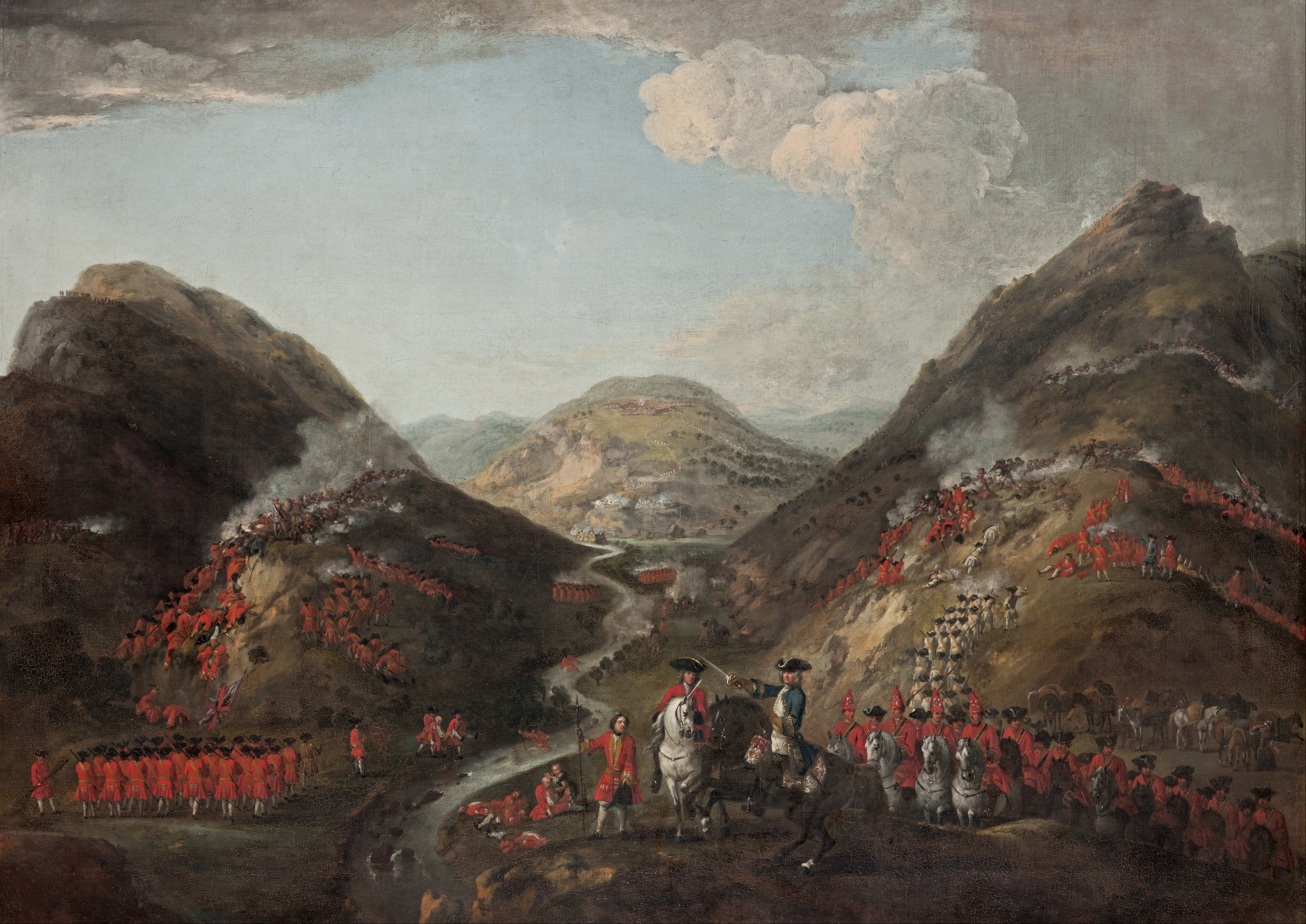
Independent Highland Companies of the Clan Munro and Clan Grant fought at the Battle of Glen Shiel in 1719.

After 1717, the Independent Highland Companies were reduced and security in the Highlands was left to regular troops who were garrisoned at Fort William, Fort Augustus and Ruthven Barracks. Highland soldiers were mixed in with the regular troops to act as guides and to maintain the peace. They were also tasked with making sure that Highlanders did not rise in arms again. These soldiers did not form Independent Companies in any sense and the sentinels were often drawn from various sources including "broken" clans. In 1719, James Stuart had gained the support of Spain, and 330 regular Spanish soldiers made it to Scotland where they joined the Clan Cameron, Clan MacGregor under Rob Roy MacGregor, Clan Mackenzie, and some Atholl men. They faced government forces under Major-General Wightman, who had fought at Sheriffmuir. He had under his command 850 regular infantry, 120 dragoons, and some hastily mustered Independent Company men drawn from the Clan Grant and Clan Munro. The Munros were a very staunch "Whig" clan and their Independent Company under the command of George Munro of Culcairn guided the government forces through the mountains and up the slopes of Glen Shiel. The Battle of Glen Shiel took place on 10 June 1719 and lasted for three hours, but the superior fire power of the government grenadiers and the aggressive forays of the Munros won the day for the Hanoverian government. The Munro Independent Company proved again how important it was to know the land and how to fight effectively against their own countrymen.

==== Aftermath ====
In 1724, Simon Fraser, 11th Lord Lovat, wrote to George I of Great Britain stating that the disbandment of the Independent Highland Companies in 1717 had encouraged the lawless situation to run riot. He also stated that the Disarming Act 1715 had left the clans loyal to the government virtually defenceless against pillage and robbery. Whig clans had conformed to the act but Jacobite clans had either chosen to ignore it or hand in weaponry which was obsolete, broken, or of little use.

In 1725, Field Marshal George Wade was appointed Commander of the Forces of North Britain and he gave instructions to re-establish the Independent Highland Companies. These instructions had come from King George I to raise six companies, which took place through 1729. The first three companies were commanded by William Grant of Ballindalloch; Simon Fraser, 11th Lord Lovat; and Sir Duncan Campbell of Lochnell. These three companies each had 100 men. The next three companies only had 75 men each and were commanded by Alexander Campbell of Finab, John Campbell of Carrick, and George Munro of Culcairn. Wade tightened up the discipline and training of the Independent Companies and warned the captains that any breach of financial dealings, which had previously been reported, would be severely dealt with.

=== Formation of the Earl of Crawford's Highland Regiment ===
In 1738, Wade reviewed the six Independent Highland Companies who by this time were known as Am Freiceadan Dubh or Black Watch. It has been suggested that this name came from their sombre dress which distinguished them from Lowland and English soldiers who were known as Seidaran Dearag (Red Soldiers). In 1739, a further four companies were added and the ten companies together were embodied to form the Earl of Crawford's "Highland Regiment", numbered 43rd in the line, (a regiment of the line).

=== Jacobite rising of 1745 ===
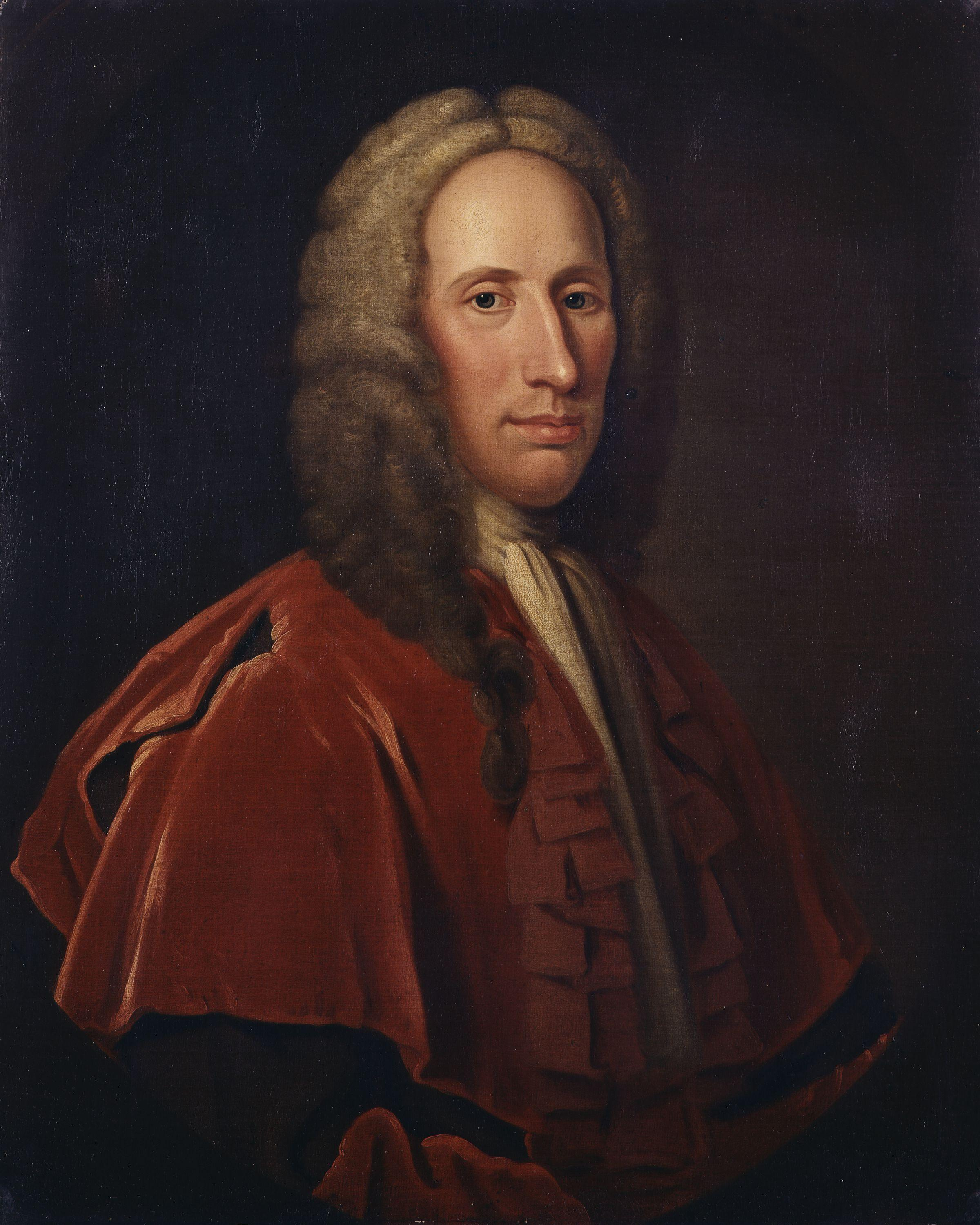
Duncan Forbes, 5th of Culloden raised the 18 Independent Highland Companies in 1745 - 1746.

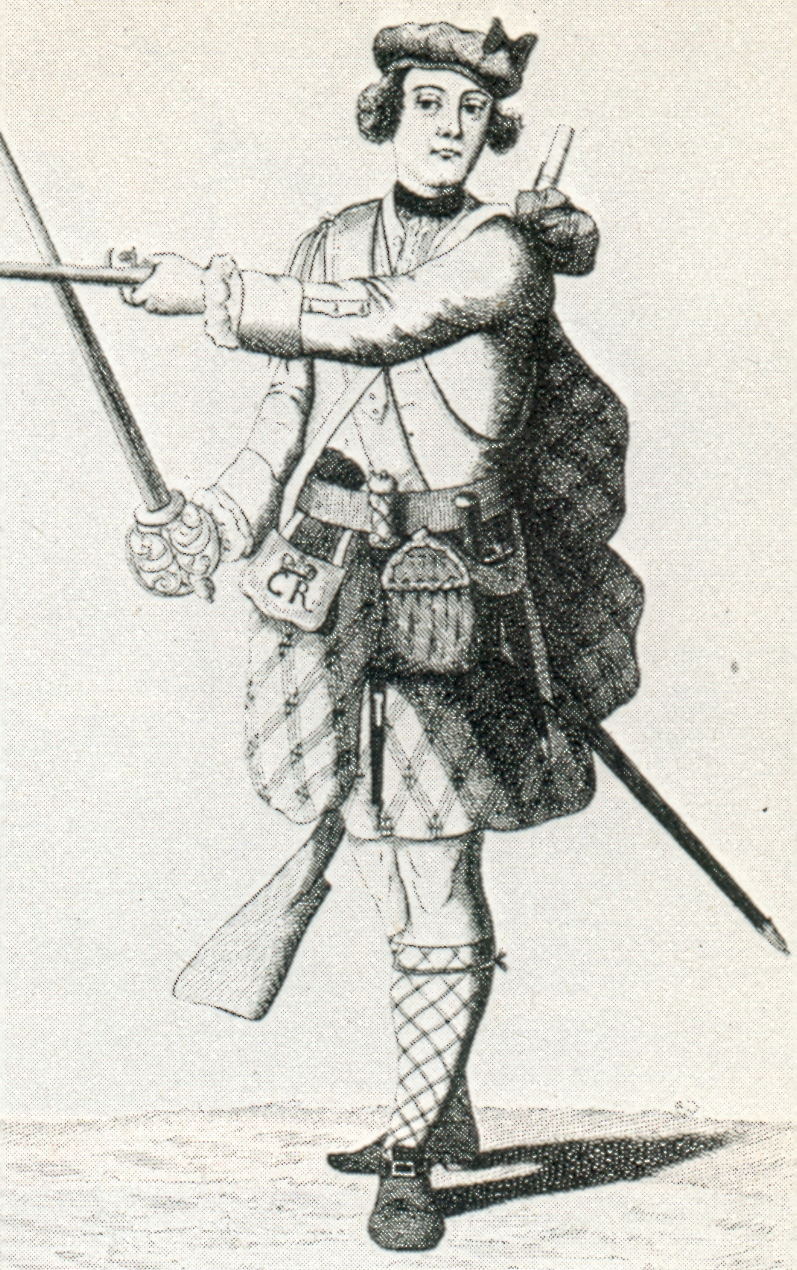
An officer of the "Black Watch" in 1743. By 1738 the Independent Highland Companies were known as Am Freiceadan Dubh or Black Watch

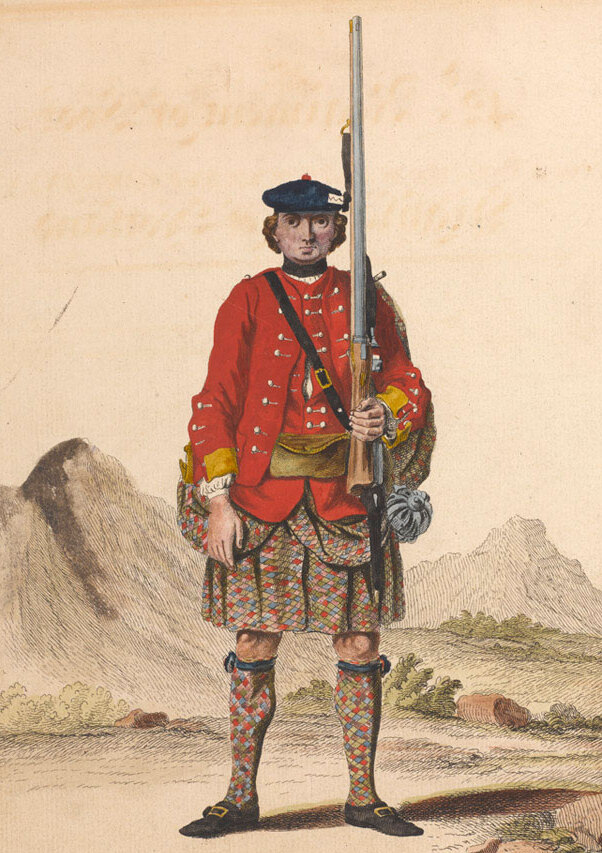
c. 1742 engraving of a private of the 43rd Regiment of Foot, which had been formed from the Independent Companies in 1739.

In September 1745, Duncan Forbes, 5th of Culloden, a staunch "whig", was given a commission to raise twenty new Independent Highland Companies to oppose the Jacobite rising of 1745. He succeeded in raising a total of eighteen Independent Highland Companies. The men were drawn from the respective clans of their commanders. Many clansmen although not related to their chief adopted the chief's surname as their own. For example, 59 out of 93 men listed by David Dobson in George Munro of Culcairn's company in 1745, had the surname Munro. The commanders of each of the 18 Independent Highland Companies are given in the table below in order of the company's completion. In some of the companies not all of the officers are of the clan name of their company. This table does not include regular regiments of the line who were also drawn from the Highlands at this time such as Loudon's Highlanders and the Earl of Crawford's Highland Regiment. The semi-professional independent companies are also often confused with the non-professional local militia companies who also supported the Government but who were less cohesively organized.

==== List of Independent Companies raised 1745–46 ====
Clan	Captain	Lieutenant	Ensign	Date of completion
Clan Munro	George Munro	Adam Gordon^{[A]}	Hugh Monro	23 October 1745
Clan Sutherland (1st company)	Alexander Gunn^{[B]}	John Gordon	Kenneth Sutherland	25 October 1745
Clan Grant	Patrick Grant	William Grant	James Grant	3 November 1745
Clan Mackay (1st company)	George Mackay	John Mackay	James Mackay	4 November 1745
Clan Sutherland (2nd company)	Peter (or Patrick) Sutherland^{[C]}	William Mackay	John Mackay	8 November 1745
Clan MacLeod (1st company)	John MacLeod^{[D]}	Alexander MacLeod	John MacAskill	15 November 1745
Clan MacLeod (2nd company)	Norman MacLeod	Donald MacLeod	John MacLeod	15 November 1745
Clan MacLeod (3rd company)	Norman MacLeod	John Campbell	John MacLeod	15 November 1745
Clan MacLeod (4th company)	Donald MacDonald	William MacLeod	John MacLeod	15 November 1745
Town of Inverness	William Mackintosh^{[E]}	Kenneth Mathisom	William Ballie	18 November 1745
Clan MacLeod of Assynt	Hugh MacLeod (of Geanies)	George Monro	Roderick MacLeod	28 November 1745
Clan Mackenzie^{[F]} (1st company)	Alexander Mackenzie	John Mathison	Simon Morchison	10 December 1745
Clan Mackenzie (2nd company)	Colin Mackenzie	Alexander Campbell	John Mackcrae	10 December 1745
Clan Macdonald of Sleat^{[G]} (1st company)	James MacDonald	Allan MacDonald	James MacDonald	31 December 1745
Clan Macdonald of Sleat (2nd company)	John MacDonald	Allan MacDonald	Donald MacDonald	31 December 1745
Clan Mackay (2nd company)	Hugh Mackay	John Mackay	Angus Mackay	6 January 1746
Clan Ross	William Ross	Charles Ross	David Ross	8 January 1746
Clan Mackenzie (3rd company)	Colin Mackenzie	Donald Mackenzie	Kenneth Mackenzie	2 February 1746

==== The 1745 campaign ====
The task of raising the above Independent Highland Companies had been made difficult in that the Secretary of War had said that three companies should be raised from the Clan Munro due to their loyalty. Forbes however ignored this and only raised one Munro company while raising three from the Clan Mackenzie and four from the Clan MacLeod of Skye, two clans who had supported the Jacobite cause in both the 1715 and 1719 risings but who now showed firm allegiance to the Hanoverian Government. The Clan Sinclair had Jacobite sympathies, and as a result were not offered a company.

The Independent Highland Companies took a very active part in the Jacobite rising of 1745. One of their first actions was when 600 men of the Grant, two Sutherland, Munro and Mackay companies fought in the Siege of Fort Augustus (December 1745). The fort was liberated from the Clan Fraser of Lovat who by this time were largely Jacobites. In 1740, Simon Fraser, 11th Lord Lovat had been stripped of his Independent Company of Frasers by Wade, and he later said that this was the main reason why he had joined the Jacobites.

On 23 December 1745, Norman MacLeod, chief of the Clan MacLeod led 500 men of the MacLeod Independent Highland Companies at the Battle of Inverurie (1745) where they were defeated by a numerically superior Jacobite force. The following February the Siege of Inverness (1746) took place where the Grant and Ross Independent Highland Companies surrendered Inverness Castle, again to a numerically superior Jacobite force. On 20 March 1746 Loudon's Highlanders regiment along with the MacLeod Independent Highland Companies were routed by a surprise Jacobite attack coordinated by James Drummond, 3rd Duke of Perth at Dornoch. 300 of Loudon's regiment were taken prisoner but the majority, 900 in all, escaped to the Isle of Skye including the commanders; John Campbell, 4th Earl of Loudoun, Duncan Forbes and Norman MacLeod. There they were reinforced by Alexander MacDonald of Sleat and the 3rd Mackenzie Independent Company, bringing their total number of men to 1300. Others of Loudon's regiment escaped to the lands of the Mackays in the far north of Sutherland.

On 25 March 1746, the 1st Mackay Independent Company under Captain George Mackay, 2nd Mackay Independent Company under Captain Hugh Mackay, one of the Sutherland Companies and some refugees of Loudon's Highlanders regiment had a notable success at the Skirmish of Tongue, where money and supplies destined for the Jacobite cause were captured from a French ship, and 156 Jacobites were taken prisoner. In response the Jacobite commander, Charles Edward Stuart, sent a large Jacobite force north under the command of George Mackenzie, 3rd Earl of Cromartie. They arrived too late to be of any use and were attacked by surprise by the 2nd Sutherland Company under the command of Ensign John Mackay and also the 2nd Mackay Company. This was known as the Battle of Littleferry where the Jacobite force was completely defeated, losing about 100 dead, and was prevented from providing much needed support to the Jacobites at the Battle of Culloden that took place the next day and which they would have been late for anyway.

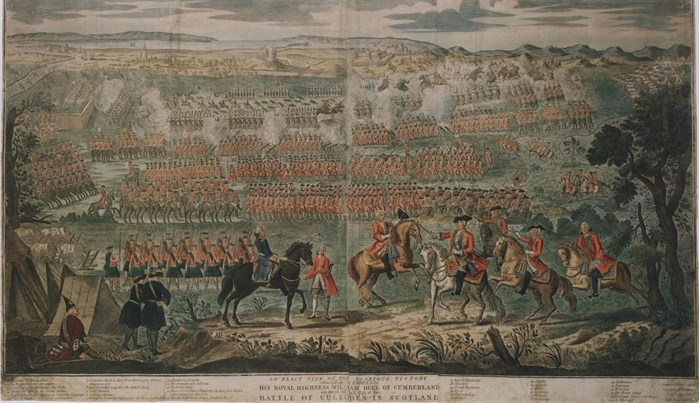
Painting by David Morier of the Battle of Culloden first published just six months after the battle in October 1746, showing in the foreground British red coat soldiers wearing kilts who were probably the Independent Highland Companies that were kept in reserve at the battle, as described by I. H Mackay Scobie. William Sutherland, 17th Earl of Sutherland who raised two Independent Highland Companies for the Government was present at the battle.

On 14 April 1746, two days before the Battle of Culloden, the Munro Independent Company and the 1st Sutherland Independent Company joined up with Prince William, Duke of Cumberland at Nairn. These two companies had been fighting with groups of Highlanders who were trying to join up with Prince Charlie at Inverness. During the Battle of Culloden, on 16 April the Independent Highland Companies (1st Sutherland) were kept in reserve, and the Munro company had already returned north. Eight companies of other Highland infantry did take part in the fighting at Culloden for the Government; 4 from the Campbell of Argyll Militia, 3 from Loudon's Highlanders under the command of Lieutenant-Colonel John Campbell and one from the Earl of Crawford's Highland Regiment under the command of Captain Dugald Campbell of Auchrossan. According to Scobie, only a small group of the Independent Highland Companies took part when they joined the Argyll militia in delivering devastating musket fire on the flank of the Jacobite right. According to Pollard it was a company from Loudon's Highlanders regiment that had joined the Campbell of Argyll militia in delivering the flanking musketry fire.

In the aftermath of the Battle of Culloden some of the MacLeod and MacDonald Independent Highland Companies were sent to capture Prince Charlie but failed to do so and it was later reported that they were not too anxious to find him either. Much of the "mopping up" work after Culloden was left to the Argyll militia and the Independent Companies who are said to have committed atrocities against their own relations and fellow clansmen. However, many other reports deny this saying that the Independent Companies did not have the stomach for crushing the embers of rebellion. By June 1746 the Independent Highland Companies had been reduced significantly and within six months after the Battle of Culloden they had been disbanded completely.

=== The 1760s ===
In 1760, commissions were given to raise five Independent Highland Companies under the following Captains: Colin Graham of Drainie, James Cuthbert of Milncraigs, Peter Gordon of Knockespick, Ludovic Grant of Rothiemurchus and Robert Campbell of Ballivolin. They were recruited up to strength and remained in training in Perth until the end of 1761 when they were added to the Keith and Campbell Highlanders regiment. In 1762 another Highland regiment of 600 men was raised, and named the 101st Johnstone Highlanders. It was due to go to Portugal to fight under John Campbell, 4th Earl of Loudoun but peace negotiations prevented this.

During the Seven Years’ War a number of unidentified Independent Highland Companies were raised but were almost immediately sent south to the Scottish Lowlands or to England as new recruits and could scarcely be regarded as true Independent Companies but were more like a recruitment agency for the British Army. There were no more Independent Highland Companies formed after 1763 but from those that had been before emerged the world-famous Highland regiments during the remainder of the 18th century.

== Notes ==
- A Adam Gordon of Ardoch who was the nephew of George Munro of Culcairn.
- B Alexander Gunn was the chief of the Clan Gunn whose lands were in Sutherland.
- C Peter or Patrick Sutherland who was a brother of Alexander Sutherland of Kinminitie and a cadet of the Sutherland of Duffus family.
- D John MacLeod was the son of Norman MacLeod, chief of Clan MacLeod.
- E William Mackintosh was acting under the command of Angus Mackintosh, chief of Clan Mackintosh, who was a captain in the Black Watch Regiment (43rd Highlanders).
- F The chief of the Clan Mackenzie in 1745 was Kenneth Mackenzie, Lord Fortrose who supported the British Government and raised three Independent Highland Companies. However, a large part of the Clan Mackenzie followed his relation George Mackenzie, 3rd Earl of Cromartie who fought for the Jacobites.
- G The Clan Macdonald of Sleat were the only branch of the Clan Donald who supported the British Government in 1745 and did not fight for the Jacobites.

== Bibliography ==
- Atholl, John James Hugh Henry Stewart-Murray (1908). Chronicles of the Atholl and Tullibardine Families. Vol. I. Edinburgh: Privately printed at the Ballantyne Press.
- Bulloch, John Malcolm (1906). The Families of Gordon of Invergordon, Newhall, also Ardoch, Ross-shire and Carrol, Sutherland. Dingwall: Ross-shire Printing and Publishing.
- Dobson, David (2007). Scottish Highlanders on the Eve of the Great Migration, 1725–1775: The Northern Highlands. Baltimore: Clearfield. ISBN 978-0-8063-5363-0.
- Fraser, Sarah (2012). The Last Highlander: Scotland's Most Notorious Clan Chief, Rebel & Double Agent. London: HarperCollins. ISBN 9780007229499.
- Fraser, William (1892). The Sutherland Book. Vol. 1. Edinburgh.
- Gregory, Donald (1836). History of the Western Highlands and Isles of Scotland, from 1493 to 1625; with an introductory sketch, from A.D. 80 to ... 1493. Edinburgh: William Tait.
- Groves, John Percy (1893). History of the 42nd Royal Highlanders – "The Black Watch" now the first battalion "The Black Watch" (Royal Highlanders) 1729–1893. Edinburgh: W. & A.K. Johnston.
- Jamieson, John (1825). Supplement to the Etymological Dictionary of the Scottish Language. Vol. 1. Edinburgh: William Tait.
- Jamieson, John (1841). Scottish Dictionary and Supplement. Vol. III. Edinburgh: William Tait.
- Keay, John; Keay, Julia (1994). Collins Encyclopaedia of Scotland. London: HarperCollins. ISBN 0002550822.
- Mackay, Angus, M.A (1906). The Book of Mackay. Edinburgh: Norman MacLeod.
- Macdonald, Angus; Macdonald, Archibald (1900). The Clan Donald. Vol. III. Inverness: The Northern Counties Publishing Company, Ltd.
- Mackenzie, Alexander (1884). History of the Camerons, with genealogies of the principal families of the name. Inverness: A. & W. Mackenzie.
- MacLeod, Ruairidh. H. F.S.A. Scot (1984). Transactions of the Gaelic Society of Inverness. Vol. LIII.
- Marriott, Patrick (2022). The Battle of Littleferry - A History and Trail Guide. Sutherland: Golspie Heritage Society.
- Oliver, Neil (2010). A History of Scotland. London: Phoenix Books. ISBN 9780753826638.
- Pollard, Tony (2009). Culloden: The History and Archaeology of the last Clan Battle. South Yorkshire: Pen and Sword Books. ISBN 978-1-84884-020-1.
- Scobie, I. H Mackay (1941). "The Highland Independent Companies 1745–47". Journal of the Society for Army Historical Research. Vol. 20. Society for Army Historical Research. pp. 5–37. JSTOR 44219908.
- Simpson, Peter (1996). The Independent Highland Companies, 1603–1760. Edinburgh: John Donald Publishers. ISBN 0-85976-432-X.
- Way, George of Plean; Squire, Romilly of Rubislaw (1994). Collins Scottish Clan & Family Encyclopedia. Glasgow: HarperCollins (for the Standing Council of Scottish Chiefs). ISBN 0-00-470547-5.

== See also ==
- 43rd Regiment of Foot - formed from the ten Independent Highland Companies (Black Watch) in 1739 and renumbered the 42nd in 1748.
- Black Watch (Royal Highland Regiment) - regiment formed in 1881 from the 42nd/43rd Highlanders Regiment until 2006.
- Black Watch - the 3rd Battalion of the Royal Regiment of Scotland formed in 2006.
- Loudon's Highlanders - Highland regiment formed in the 18th century.
- John Campbell, 4th Earl of Loudoun - founder of the above regiment.
- Duncan Forbes, 5th of Culloden - responsible for raising Independent Highland Companies in 1745 - 1746.
- Scottish clan - Kinship groups from which the men of the Independent Highland Companies were drawn from.
- Privy Council of Scotland - advisory body to the king that was responsible for raising the early Independent Highland Companies.
- Campbell of Argyll Militia - similar militia unit raised in the south-west Scottish Highlands.
