= Donald Murchison =

Jacobite, Scottish-born military commander (c.1687–1727)

Colonel Donald Murchison
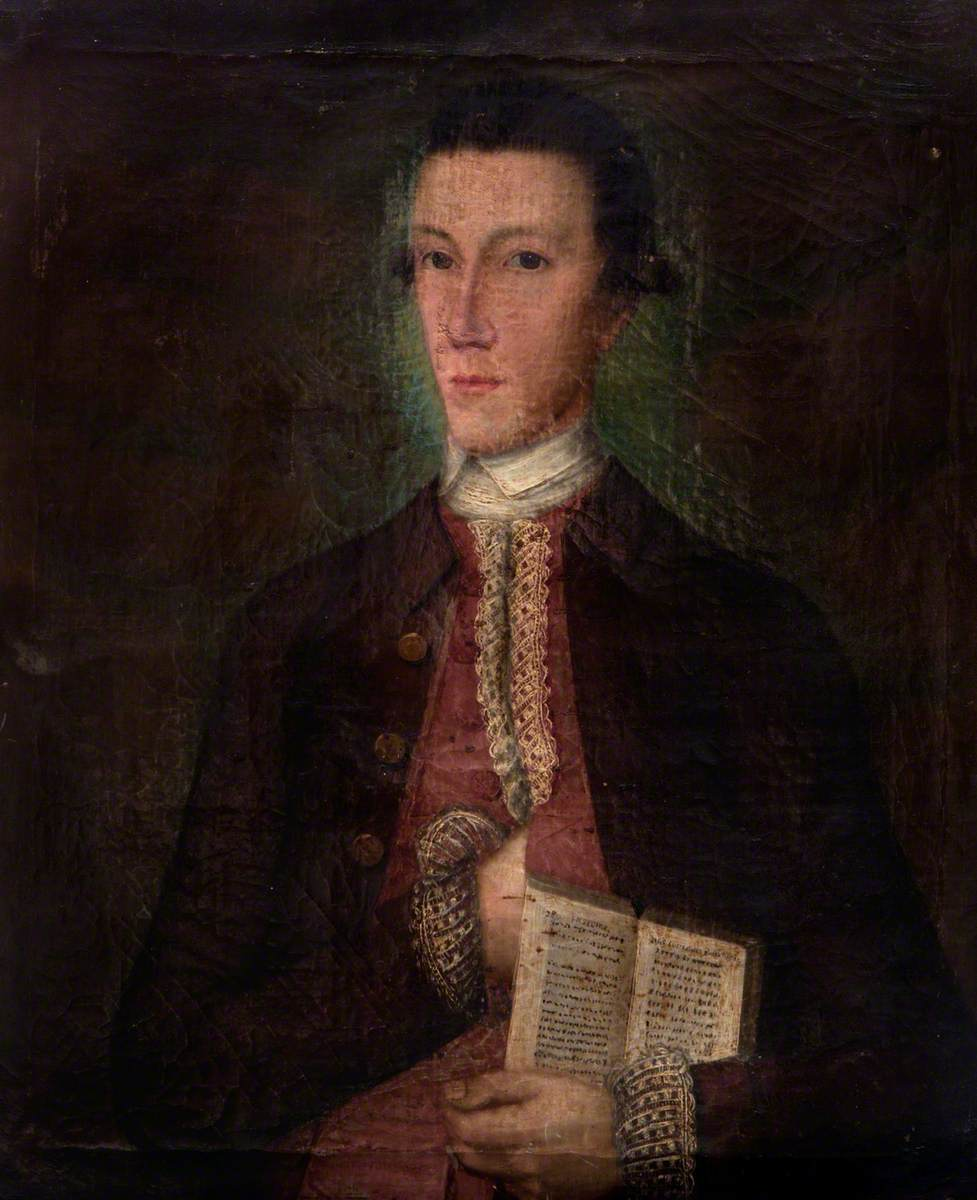
- Born: c. 1687; Bundalloch, Loch Long, Scotland
- Died: 1727 (aged 39–40)
- Burial place: Urray, Scotland
- Known for: Battle of Sheriffmuir, Battle of Glen Shiel, Battle of Glen Affric, Battle of Coille Bhan
- Relatives: Roderick Murchison

Signature
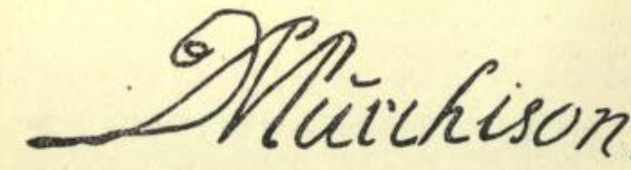

Donald Murchison (c.1687–1727) was a Scottish born military commander, a Jacobite and chamberlain to the exiled Earl of Seaforth. He led Jacobite forces at the Battle of Sheriffmuir, the Battle of Glen Shiel, the Battle of Glen Affric and the Battle of Coille Bhan.

== Early life ==
Murchison was born at the crofting township of Bundalloch, Loch Long, Scotland in c. 1687, the eldest of four children. He was educated in the classics and then studied law in Edinburgh.

For a short time before the Jacobite rising of 1715 Murchison acted as factor to Sir John Preston 4th baronet of Preston Hall in Midlothian.

== Jacobite years ==
Murchison became a tenant of Auchtertyre, and chamberlain to William Mackenzie, 5th Earl of Seaforth.

=== The Jacobite rising and the Battle of Sheriffmuir ===
When the Earl of Seaforth rallied his clansmen to the Stuart standard for the Jacobite rising of 1715 he chose Donald Murchison to be his Lieutenant Colonel and Murchison commanded Seaforth's troops during the ensuing Battle of Sheriffmuir. According to Murchison family tradition the commission which gave Donald Murchison the rank of Colonel was sent to him by the Pretender in a "quaint large ivory 'snuff-mull' inscribed with the words JAMES REX. FORWARD AND SPARE NOT". (Note: The snuff box is now in the collection of the National Museum of Scotland but the connection with the Pretender has not been substantiated. It also features on Landseer's painting "Rent-day in the Wilderness".)

Soon after the Jacobite forces retreated from Sheriffmuir, Seaforth fled to France and from then until 1726 Murchison was the military leader of the Mackenzies, Maclennans, and M’Raes in the Jacobite opposition to government forces.

=== Eilean Donan Castle and the Battle of Glen Shiel ===
Murchison raised troops for Seaforth when he briefly returned to Scotland during the Jacobite rising of 1719 and he gave tactical advice for the short campaign. Murchison is said to have been "responsible for blowing up the castle of Eilean Donan" to prevent it from falling into the hands of Government forces. (Note: The exact meaning of this is ambiguous. Captain Charles Boyle of the HMS Worcester recorded in the ship's logs for 12 May 1719 that "At 3 pm sent across 16 barrels of powder to blow up the castle. At 9 the westermost part of the castle blew up." The wording of the ship's log does not explicitly state that the explosion was initiated by government forces but it is clear that they intended to destroy the castle so the Jacobites would have little to gain by blowing it up at this point. However, another source, in which it is simply stated that "the Castle was blown up" goes on to tell that "The Flamborough went up Loch Duich in search of another magazine which had been formed near the head of the loch, under a guard of 80 Spaniards, who blew it up as she approached" and that "this magazine was beside the small fresh-water lake called Loch nan Corr, close to where the Manse of Kintail now stands". The ships logs also mention a similar incident which took place on the previous day (11 May): "We had intelligence by a Spanish deserter who came over to us that there was a house there with several barrels of powder in it. Upon the Flamborough appearing near the House, the rebels set fire to a great quantity of powder and other ammunition." Murchison's roll might have involved one of these other magazines.) The castle was destroyed in mid-May and on 10 June the two forces faced one another at the Battle of Glen Shiel. The Jacobites had some brief success during the initial engagements but by the end of the day they were overwhelmed and escaped the scene. Seaforth had been wounded in the knee by a musket ball and he returned to exile in France.

After the Battle of Glen Shiel, Seaforth lost his title and lands under the Crown Lands (Forfeited Estates) Act 1715. The Commissioners for the Forfeited Estates were charged with determining the location and value of forfeited estates and arranging their sale by auction to the highest bidder. In 1720 the Commissioners appointed two men of the Clan Ross - William Ross, 6th of Easter Fearn (ex-Provost of Tain) and his brother Robert Ross (Baillie of Tain) - as factors, to serve as their estate managers on-the-ground for the estates of Mackenzie of Seaforth. The factors started by sending out notices to the various tenants, then in February 1721 officers were sent to the district but they were seized and robbed of their papers, money, and arms.

At the same time, in defiance of the government, Murchison was acting as Seaforth's factor and collecting the Seaforth rents. A proportion of the funds he collected were used to keep on foot a party of about sixty armed Highlanders, to defend the Seaforth estates against any of George I's troops who might be sent to Kintail, the rest were delivered to Seaforth in Paris, on occasions by Murchison himself.

=== The Battle of Glen Affric ===
The next substantive step taken by the Ross factors involved embarking from Inverness on 13 September 1721 with a party of thirty soldiers and some armed servants of their own in order to enforce submission to their legal claims. En route, at Knockfin, near Tomich, Lieutenant Brymer from Bernera joined the party with fifty additional soldiers.

The party set out at 4:00am on Monday 2 October with Brymer's men first, and the factors in the rear. As they approached Loch Affric Ross's party was "ambushed" by men under Murchison's command, after a series of skirmishes they advanced a few miles further and reached Ath nam Muileach (anglicized as Athnamulloch), "about a hundred yards from the end of Loch Affric" where a larger party of Murchison's men were positioned along with Murchison himself. Some casualties were incurred but Murchison's party prevailed and the Rosses agreed to return home, promising never again to officiate as factors and handed their commissions to Murchison.

=== The Battle of Coille Bhan ===
After the Battle of Glen Affric a Court of Inquiry was held in Inverness in November 1721, primarily to establish, or confirm, the identities of the Jacobite perpetrators. The witnesses named several individuals and also confirmed the presence of the factor for the Earl of Seaforth who they named variously as Donald Murchison or Daniel Murchison. With this information another attempt was made to implement the forfeiture and this time it was to be a purely military operation. A force of 160 soldiers left Inverness under the command of a Captain McNeil who had previously served in the Highland Watch regiment. They met the Jacobites, led by Murchison, in August 1722, at the Battle of Coille Bhan. The government forces defeated an advance Jacobite position commanded by Kenneth Murchison but when McNeil heard of a larger group of Jacobites led by Colonel Murchison he withdrew his forces and returned to Inverness. No further attempts were made to enforce the forfeiture of Seaforth's lands.

General Wade reporting to George I in 1725 wrote that "the rents [of the Seaforth lands] continue to be collected by one Donald Murchison, a servant of the late Earl's, who remits or carries the same to his master into France. . . . The last year this Murchison marched in a public manner to Edinburgh to remit £800 to France, and remained fourteen days there unmolested. I cannot omit observing to your Majesty that this national tenderness the subjects of North Britain have one for the other is a great encouragement for rebels and attainted persons to return home from their banishment."

It has been written that Murchison "acted under a sense of right which, though unfortunately defiant of acts of parliament, was still a very pure sense of right".

== Death, legacy and descendents ==
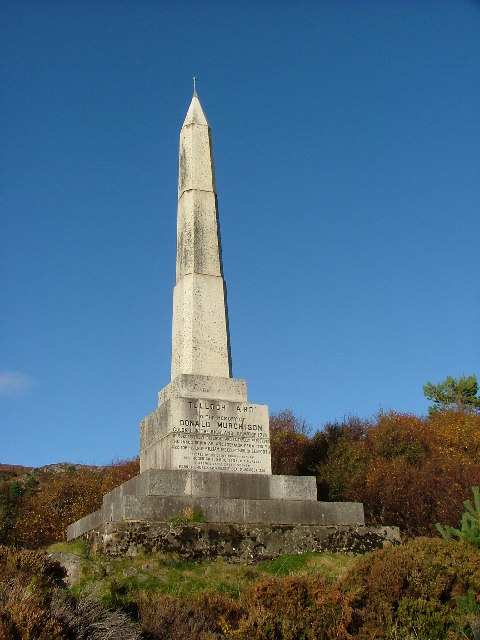
Donald Murchison's Monument, Loch Alsh

Murchison died in March 1727 and is buried in Urray, Scotland.

His brother, Murdoch Murchison, outlived him and was wounded at Culloden in 1746.

Murchison and his actions were celebrated in verse and a monument to him was erected on the shores of Loch Duich in 1863 by one of his descendents, the geologist Sir Roderick Impey Murchison. Another descendent, Kenneth Murchison Massie Cox Murchison, arranged for the monument to be rebuilt after it was demolished by a lightning strike in 1927.

The inscription on the monument describes Roderick Murchison as the great-grandnephew of Donald Murchison but the exact relationship between the two may be more distant. Archibald Geikie, who was Roderick Murchison's biographer as well as being a close friend and professional colleague, wrote that "His grandfather was a third cousin of the Colonel".

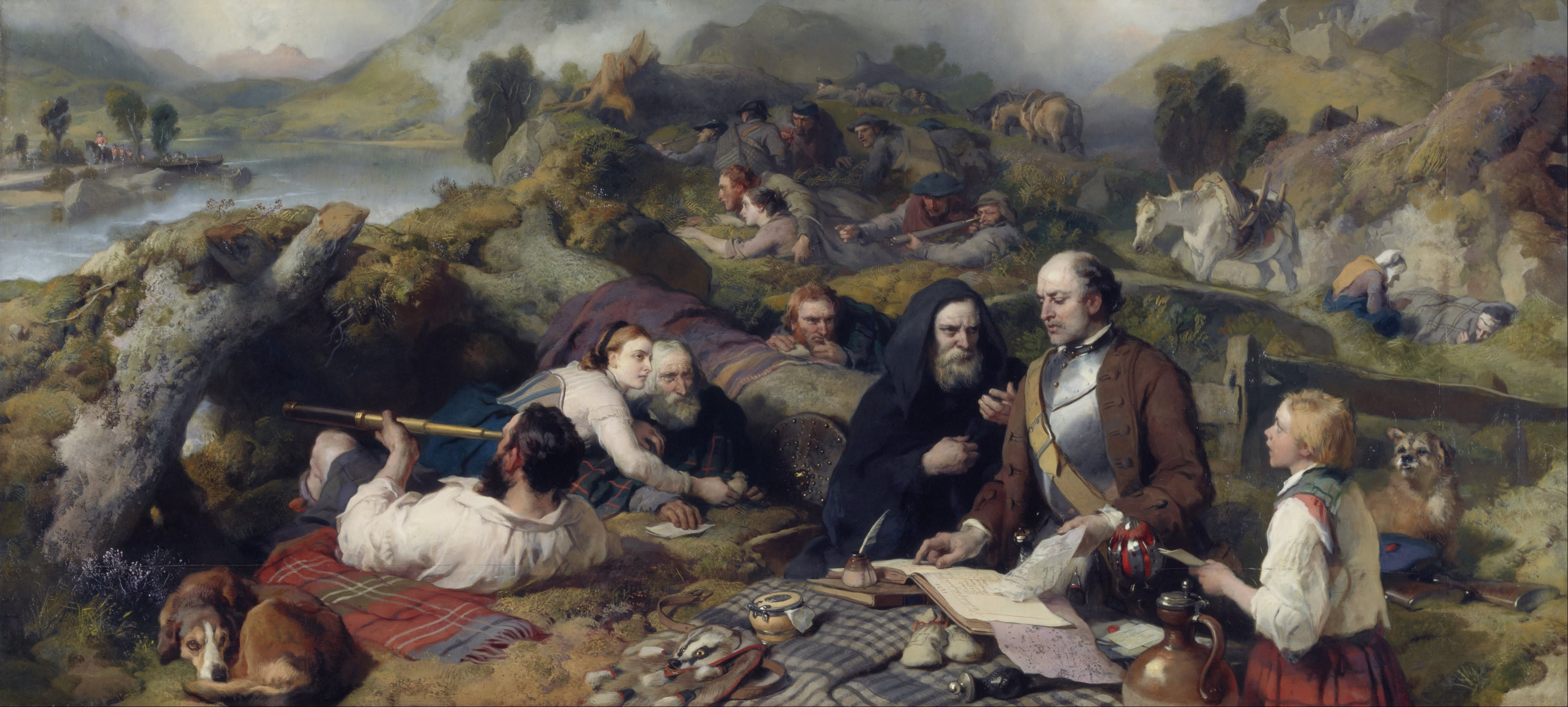
Rent Day in the Wilderness by Sir Edwin Landseer

Roderick Murchison also commissioned the painting, Rent Day in the Wilderness by Sir Edwin Landseer which shows Donald Murchison wearing a breastplate whilst collecting rents and includes the 'snuff-mull' in which the Pretender allegedly enclosed Murchison's commission as Colonel.

== See also ==
- Murchison (sept)
