= Murchison (sept) =

Minor Scottish clan

The Murchison family of Loch Alsh, Ross-shire, Scotland were a minor Scottish clan, and a sept of the larger Clan Mackenzie. In modern times the Murchison surname is still considered a sept of the Clan Mackenzie by the Clan Mackenzie Society of Scotland & the UK.

== History ==
=== Origins ===
The Murchison sept are descended from Murdoch or Murcha (Gaelic: Murchadh) who in 1362 received a charter for lands in Kintail from David II of Scotland. It is supposed that the Murchisons were long governors of Eilean Donan Castle. In 1563 a dispute arose between the Macraes and the MacLennans over who should hold the honorable post of constable of the castle, and the Mackenzie laird ultimately gave it to the priest John MacMhurchaidh Duhibh (Murchison). This did not suit the MacLennans who later shot Murchison in the buttocks with an arrow. Padraic MacGiolla-Domhnaigh says that the name was also anglicised as Morrow, MacMorrow and Morrowson.

=== 18th century and Jacobite risings ===
Following the Jacobite rising of 1715, William Mackenzie, 5th Earl of Seaforth was exiled in France. However his factor, Colonel Donald Murchison, continued to collect the rents from his tenants and send them to his master in France. This led to action by the Mackenzie's rivals, the Clan Ross, who supported the British Government, resulting in the Battle of Glen Affric in 1721, where Donald Murchison led the Clan Mackenzie in defeating the forces loyal to the government. This was followed by the Battle of Coille Bhan in 1722 where Donald Murchison, along with his relative Kenneth Murchison, again led the Clan Mackenzie in successfully holding their lands from the government.

During the Jacobite rising of 1745 the Mackenzie chief, Kenneth Mackenzie, Lord Fortrose, supported the British-Hanoverian Government, raising three Independent Highland Companies in support of the government, and Simon Morchison (Murchison) was an ensign of one of those companies.
