= Da Loria Norman =

American artist (1872–1935)

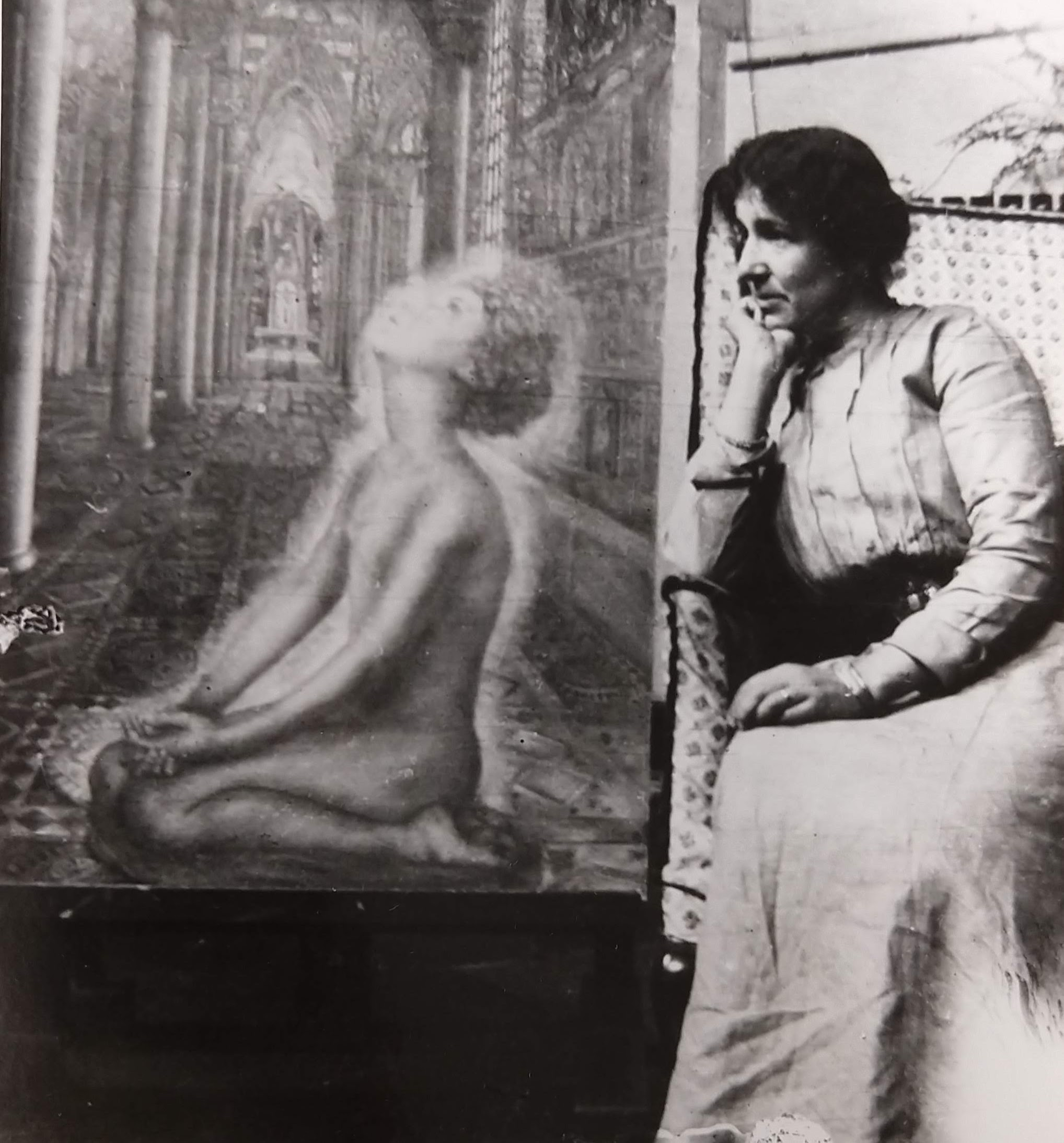
da Loria Norman seated with painting "Child of the Ages", c. 1929.

Da Loria Norman (1872–1935) was an American artist. Norman was noted for painting and for her illumination of books and images, and partnered with leading English artists such as Walter Crane. One of her most significant commissions was the illumination of "Ecclesiastes and the Song of Solomon", a Ballantyne Press vellum edition designed by Charles Ricketts, for the Spencer Bequest of the New York Public Library. Norman's work is held in the Smithsonian American Art Museum, among other collections.

== Biography ==
Born Belle Mitchell in Kansas, she moved to England during her childhood, where she married, had children, and began her artistic career. Belle's marriage was not a happy one, and she left her husband several times with her children to live with her friend Adah Franks. After her divorce, she changed her name to da Loria, and embraced a life of art and mysticism. Inspired by 15th-century manuscript illumination, a contemporary review of her work noted that the "quality of her illumination is unquestionable, her technique truly remarkable". She became a member of the London branch of the Theosophical Society in 1914.

At the outbreak of World War I, Norman returned to the United States in 1914, where she lived in Old Lyme, Connecticut, and New York City. She died in New York City in 1935.

== Exhibition history ==
- "Symbolical and Mysterical Paintings by Mrs. da Loria Norman." MacBride Atelier (New York City.) Jan. 15 – Feb. 15, 1917.
- "Exhibition of oil and water color paintings, illuminated vellums, and books by Mrs. da Loria Norman." Rosenbach Galleries. Nov. 16–17, 1920.
- "Exhibition of paintings For the Fatherless Children of France." American Art Association–Anderson Galleries. Feb. 26, 1921.

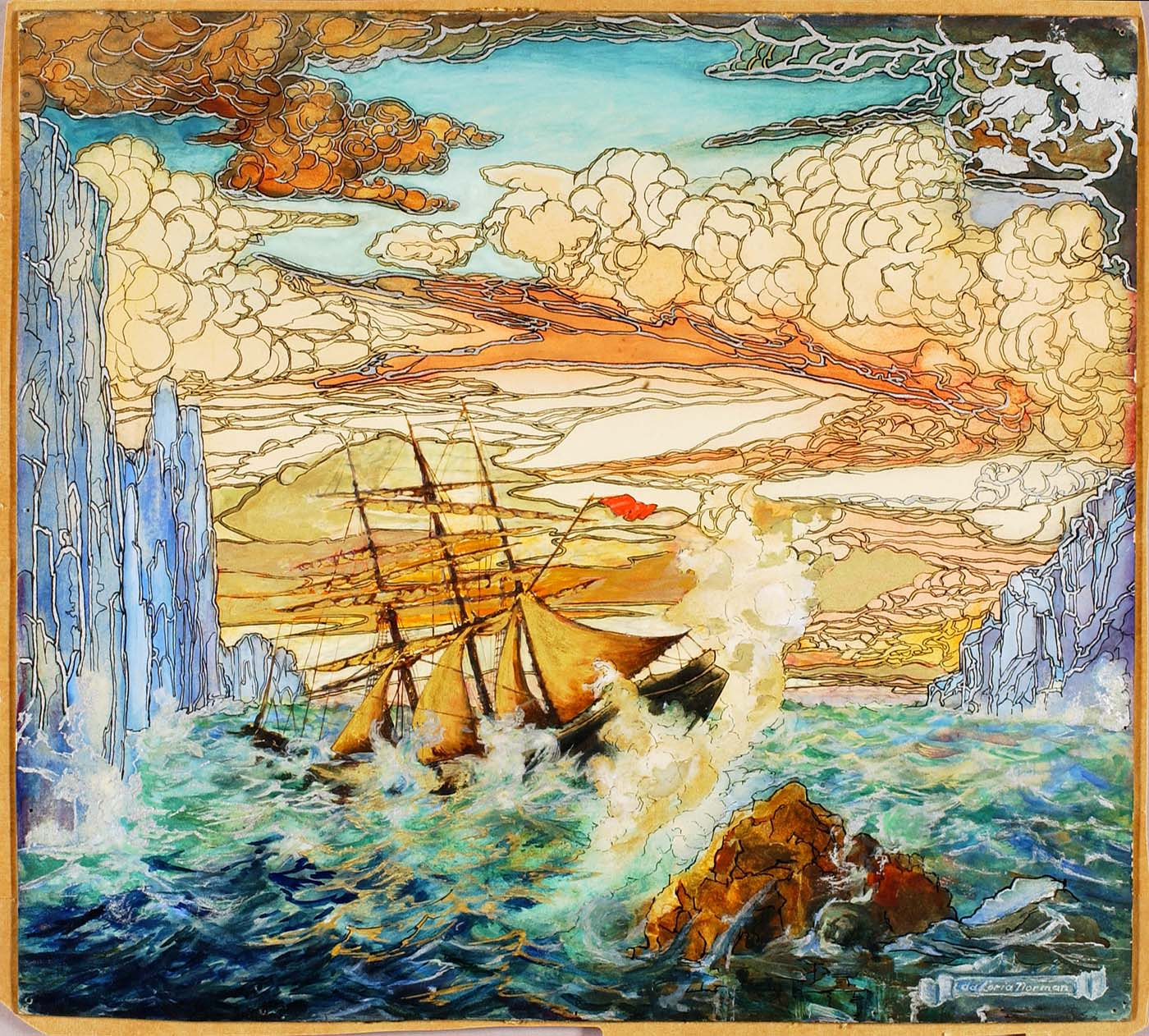
Da Loria Norman, Shipwreck, ca. 1920, pen and ink and watercolor on paperboard, Smithsonian American Art Museum, Gift of Cynthia A. Norman, 1979.139

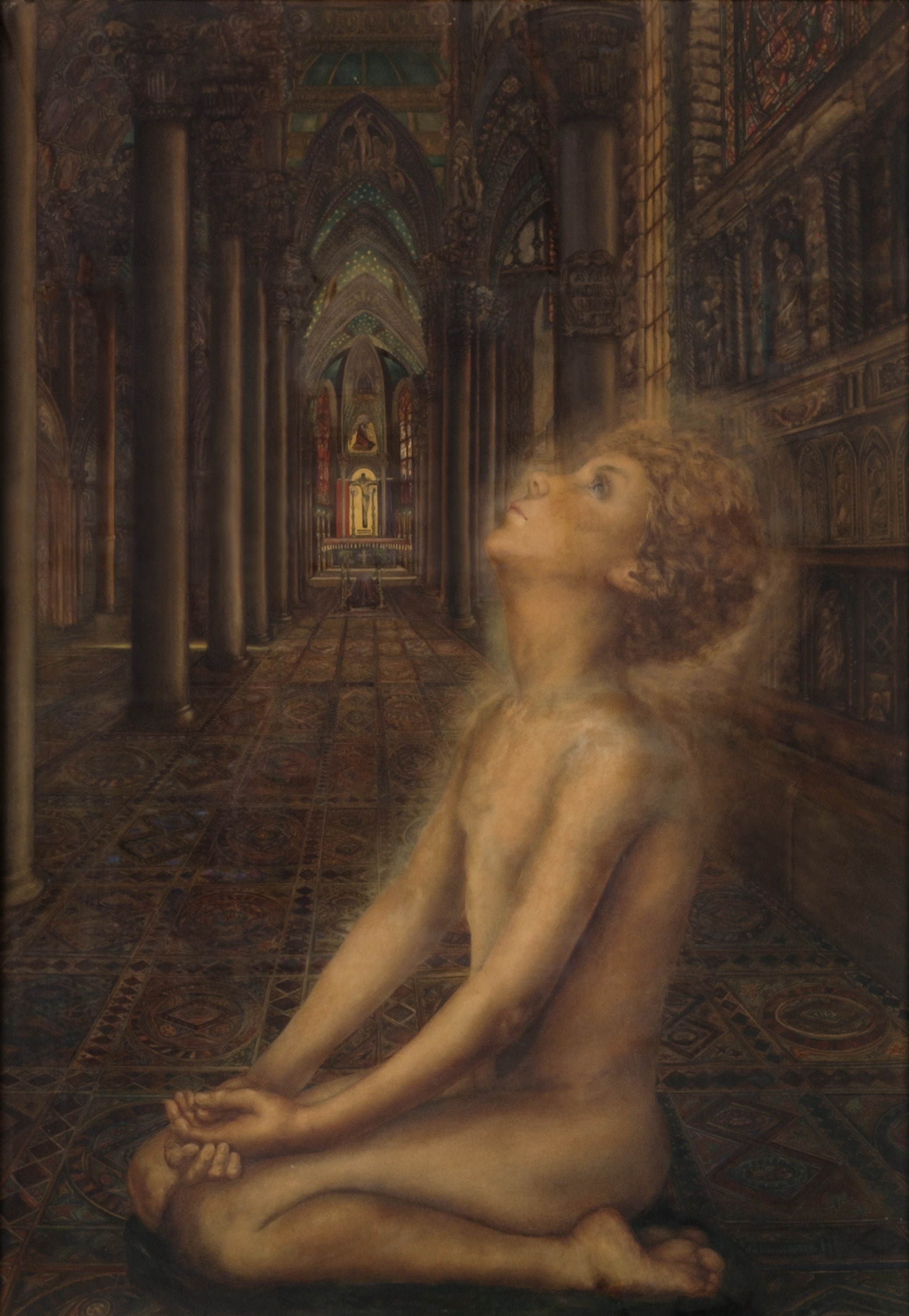
Da Loria Norman 'Child of the Ages' ca. 1914 pastel, watercolor, and gold paint on paperboard, Smithsonian American Art Museum Gift of Mrs. Sherwood Norman
