= Tait's Edinburgh Magazine =

British publication (1832–1861)

Tait's Edinburgh Magazine was a monthly periodical founded in 1832. It was an important venue for liberal political views, as well as contemporary cultural and literary developments, in early-to-mid-nineteenth century Britain.

The magazine was founded by William Tait (1792–1864), the son of a builder and an inheritor of a large fortune. Tait was an "independent radical" in politics; he strongly favored the Whig party. 1832 was a time of great political ferment, with the first Reform Bill the dominant subject of discourse. Tait's periodical was intended as a "Radical riposte" to "the politically revanchist but culturally avant-garde Blackwood's Edinburgh Magazine." Tait's welcomed many new and unknown writers like Robert Nicoll, as well as established voices like John Galt, James Henry Leigh Hunt, and figures of future fame like Harriet Martineau and John Stuart Mill.

From 1833 on, Tait's Magazine was a regular venue for the essays of Thomas De Quincey. De Quincey's series of biographical essays on the Lake Poets (later collected as Recollections of the Lake Poets) were featured in Tait's between 1834 and 1840. Tait published a range of other selections by De Quincey, including, somewhat surprisingly, "A Tory's Account of Toryism, Whiggism and Radicalism" (December 1835, January 1836). That article, however, was supplied with many sarcastic footnotes disagreeing with its points — "objecting foot-notes from the pen, presumably, of Tait himself."

In 1834 Tait's Magazine was combined with Johnstone's Edinburgh Magazine, a liberal periodical started two years earlier by husband and wife John Johnstone and Christian Isobel Johnstone. She was an early feminist who wrote extensively for Tait's in the following years, becoming the magazine's "chief contributor and director" under William Tait himself. Christian Johnstone was "the first woman to serve as paid editor of a major Victorian periodical," to which she brought "fresh life and popularity." In the same year Alexander Bailey Richmond took the magazine's London agents to court, for reviewing a work calling Richmond a government spy: the defence was successful.

Christian Johnstone died in 1857; Tait's Magazine ceased publication in 1861.
