= Alexander Bailey Richmond =

British government spy

- Occupation: Weaver

Alexander Bailey Richmond (fl. 1809–1834) was a British government spy.

== Biography ==
Richmond was by trade a weaver. In early life he lived in Ireland, where the distress of the people made a lasting impression on him. Between 1809 and 1812, when living at Pollockshaws in Renfrewshire, he took a leading part in an agitation for the raising of wages in the weaving trade. In January 1812, at a conference in the Glasgow council chamber between representatives of the masters and the operatives, Richmond was the chief spokesman of the latter. During these meetings, according to Richmond's account, the first overtures were made to him on behalf of government by Kirkman Finlay, a leading Glasgow capitalist. The Glasgow conference proved fruitless, and Richmond and the operatives, by the advice of their counsel, Jeffrey and Henry Cockburn, vainly applied to the law courts to put pressure on the magistrates to fix wages in accordance with an existing statute. At the end of 1812 a strike was resolved on and was conducted by Richmond with great ability; it was for several weeks general throughout the Scottish weaving trade; but in February 1813 it suddenly collapsed. In December 1812 Richmond was arrested on a charge of instigating the strike, and sent to Paisley gaol, but liberated on bail after an eight hours' examination. He undertook to arrange a compromise, and dissuaded the strikers from violence. Nevertheless, on 9 March 1813, Richmond and other strike leaders were prosecuted for combination and conspiracy. Under the advice of Jeffrey and Cockburn, Richmond did not appear and was outlawed. He fled by way of Lancashire to Dublin, but returned to Scotland early in 1814, after being assured that he should be let alone if he kept quiet. The outlawry was not reversed. In March 1815 he surrendered to the sheriff of Renfrewshire, and on 26 June, having pleaded guilty to the bulk of the indictment, was sentenced to a month's additional imprisonment pro forma.

In the spring of 1816, with capital lent him by Jeffrey, Cockburn, and others, he set up in Glasgow a warehouse for the sale of cotton and silk goods, and at the end of the year was introduced by Kirkman Finlay, the sitting member for Glasgow, to Robert Owen of New Lanark. The latter offered him the post of assistant schoolmaster, but retracted the offer when he became aware of Richmond's political opinions. In the meantime Richmond claimed to have been employed by Finlay in suppressing in Glasgow an alleged "reform" conspiracy against the government. In December 1816, while he rejected an offer from the government of "a respectable and permanent situation," he promised, on condition that no publicity were ever given to his action, to prevent any outbreak on the part of the Glasgow conspirators. On 22 February 1817 all the members of the reform committee were suddenly arrested, without his having been consulted. Richmond, according to his own account, was indignant, and offered to give evidence for the defence. A suspicion got abroad that he had manufactured the whole plot.

In May 1818 he refused the government's offer, made to him through Finlay, of a grant of land at the Cape and an outfit in return for his services. In February 1821 he accepted a sum of money, and, owing to the universal feeling against him in Glasgow, removed to Edinburgh. In 1824 Richmond published an able defence of his conduct, which, according to Cockburn, has "a general foundation of truth in it." A second edition appeared next year. In 1825 Hugh Dickson, a Glasgow weaver, held him up to derision as a contemptible informer in a pamphlet which was embodied in 1833 in "An Exposure of the Spy System in Glasgow, 1816–1820." "Tait's Edinburgh Magazine" noticed the "Exposure" favourably, and Richmond prosecuted for libel Tait's London agents, Simpkin & Marshall. The trial took place on 20 and 22 December 1834 in the court of exchequer, Guildhall, before Baron Pack and a special jury. Richmond, who claimed 5,000l. damages, conducted his own case. He described himself as a London parliamentary agent. In the previous year, he declared, he had served as a soldier at Antwerp. He spoke for four hours with some ability, but was nonsuited. Notwithstanding the issue of the trial, Jeffery and Cockburn still expressed approval of Richmond's conduct, and the latter spoke of his "gentleness and air of melancholy thoughtfulness." Talfourd, who was counsel for the defence, told Cockburn he hated Richmond "the spy" equally with "the English courts, Tam Campbell and Brougham" (Cockburn, Circuit Journeys, p. 33).

A portrait is prefixed to the "Exposure".
