= Christian Isobel Johnstone =

Scottish journalist and author

- Born: 12 June 1781
- Died: 26 August 1857
- Other name: Margaret Dods
- Occupations: Editor, writer

Christian Isobel Johnstone (1781–1857) was a prolific journalist and author in Scotland in the nineteenth century. She was a significant early feminist and an advocate of other liberal causes in her era. She wrote anonymously, and under the pseudonym Margaret Dods. She is highlighted as one of the first paid female editors of a (Victorian) journal.

== Life ==
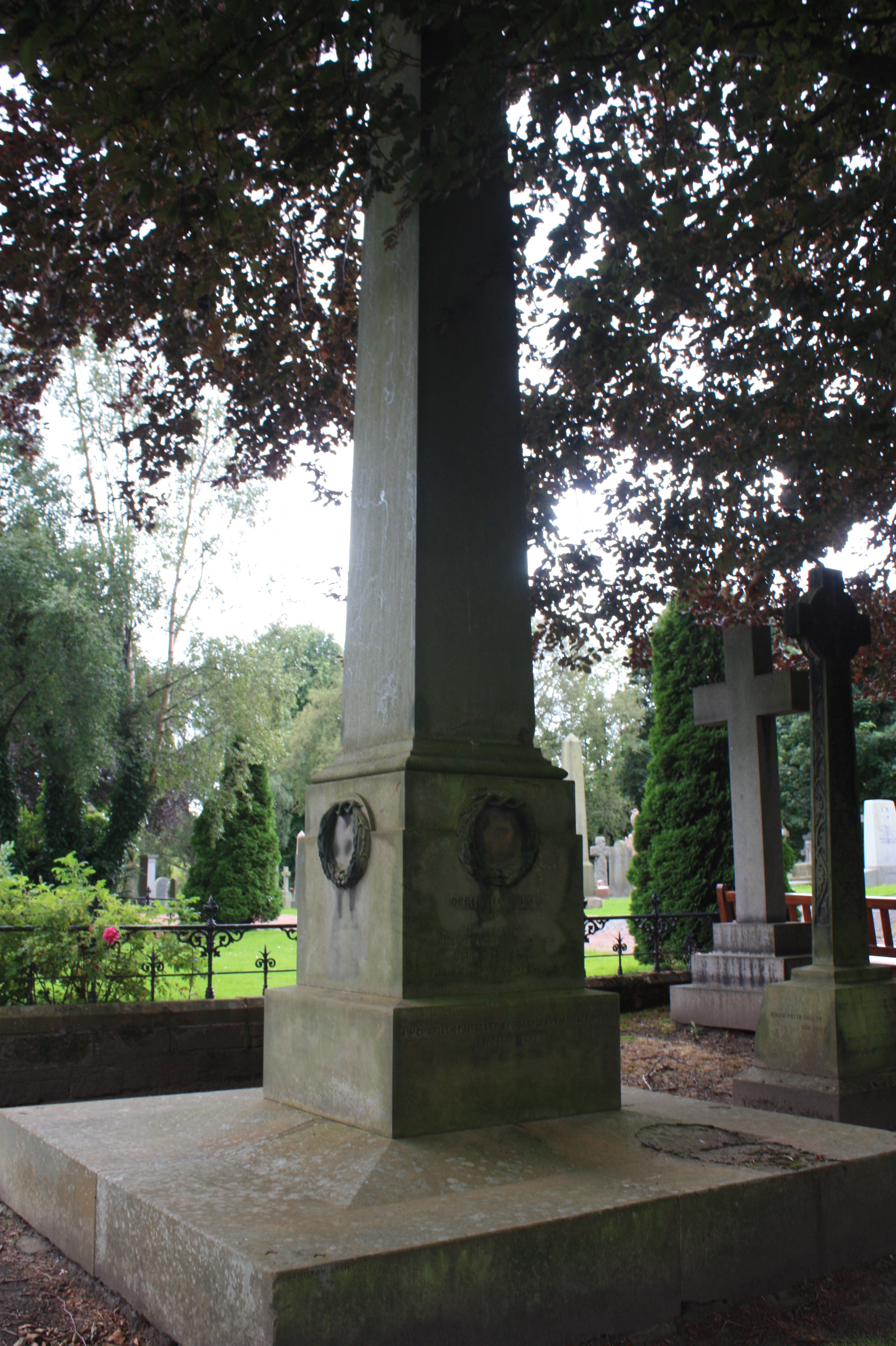
The grave of Christian Isobel Johnstone, Grange Cemetery, Edinburgh

She is thought to be the Christian Todd who was born on 12 June 1781 in the Edinburgh parish of St. Cuthbert. She married at the age of sixteen, to an Edinburgh printer named Thomas McCleish; they separated in 1805, and she divorced him in 1814. Christian then remarried: to John Johnstone, a former Dunfermline schoolmaster, who had come to Edinburgh as a printer and engraver. They married in June 1815.

Christian Isobel Johnstone wrote a number of popular fiction works in three and four volumes, for adults and juvenile readers. Her novel Clan-Albin: A National Tale (1815) was perhaps her best-known work; she also wrote The Saxon and the Gaël (1814), and "her best novel," Elizabeth de Bruce (1827), among other titles. Johnstone also wrote non-fiction books on a range of subjects, like Scenes of Industry Displayed in the Beehive and the Anthill (1827) and Lives and Voyages of Drake, Cavendish, and Dampier (1831). These books, like most of Johnstone's volumes, were printed anonymously. Her The Cook and Housewife's Manual (1826) was issued under the pseudonym Margaret Dods. This use of Margaret Dods mirrored the character name of Margaret Dods, the hostess of the Cleikum Inn in Walter Scott's novel Saint Ronan's Well (1823). Later praised by Abraham Hayward in The Quarterly Review. The cookbook is written from the perspective of Scott's character, and includes an introduction written by Scott that mentions other characters from the novel. It was only late in her life, as with The Edinburgh Tales (1846), that she was identified by name on her title pages.

She and her second husband started and ran several periodicals – The Schoolmaster, The Edinburgh Weekly Magazine, and others. In 1832, the year of the first Reform Bill, the Johnstones founded Johnstone's Edinburgh Magazine as a voice for the causes they favoured. The periodical struggled financially, and in 1834 it was combined with another new journal, Tait's Magazine. (The Johnstones insisted that the cover price of Tait's be cut by more than half, to 1 shilling per copy, to make the magazine available to the widest possible audience.) Isobel Johnstone continued as a major contributor to Tait's, and in effect served as the magazine's editor under publisher William Tait; she was "the first woman to serve as paid editor of a major Victorian periodical...."

She lived at 7 Park Street in Edinburgh.

She died on 26 August 1857. She is buried beneath a huge obelisk midway along the main eastern path of Grange Cemetery in southern Edinburgh. Her husband died a few months later and is buried with her.

== See also ==
- 1815 in literature
