= 101st Regiment of Foot (1760) =

101st Regiment of Foot (Johnston's Highlanders)
- Active: 1760–1763
- Country: Kingdom of Great Britain
- Branch: British Army
- Type: Line Infantry
- Size: One battalion

The 101st Regiment of Foot, or Johnston's Highlanders, was an infantry regiment of the British Army, formed in 1760 and disbanded in 1763. The regiment was raised in 1760 by the regimentation of independent companies of infantry raised in Argyll and Ross-shire; in 1761 it was moved into England, and its other ranks drafted to the 87th and 88th Foot.

The officers were returned to Perth to assemble another six companies in 1762, but after these were assembled the regiment was disbanded due to the end of hostilities. The unofficial title "Johnston's Highlanders" was adopted from its first Major-Commandant, Sir James Johnston of Westerhall.
