= Battle of Coille Bhan =

Battle at the height of the 1719 Jacobite Rising

- Part of the aftermath of the Jacobite rising of 1719
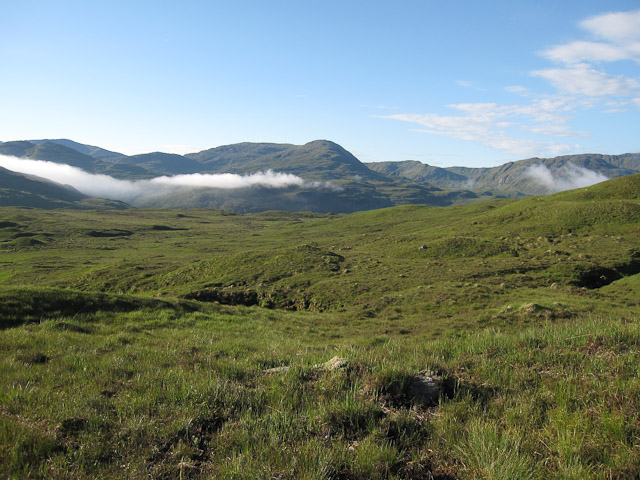
- Attadale Forest
Date	August 1722
Location	Attadale, Scotland, Great Britain
Result	see Aftermath

Belligerents
(Kingdom of Great Britain) British Army	Rebel Highlanders

Commanders and leaders
Captain McNeil	Donald Murchison

Strength
Unknown	160 men

Casualties and losses
Unknown	1 killed

The Battle of Coille Bhan (Scottish Gaelic for White Wood) was fought in August 1722 near Attadale, in the county of Ross in the Scottish Highlands in the aftermath of the Jacobite rising of 1719. It was fought between a British government force against Highlanders of the Clan Mackenzie.

== Background ==
The Battle of Coille Bhan followed on from the Battle of Glen Affric in 1721 when government forces had failed to take the lands of Mackenzie of Seaforth. The taxes being collected by Mackenzie's factor, Donald Murchison were being sent to Mackenzie himself who was living in exile in France for his part in the Jacobite rising of 1715, rather than the taxes going to the British crown. It was decided that a second attempt should be made to seize the estates of Mackenzie of Seaforth.

This time 160 soldiers of Colonel Kirk's regiment left Inverness under the command of Captain McNeil who had previously served in the Highland Watch regiment. Unlike their predecessors who had been ambushed in Glen Affric, McNeil took a longer but easier route, from to Inverness to Dingwall, Strath-garve, and Loch Carron.

Mackenzie's force were led by Colonel Donald Murchison who had been in command at the previous conflict in Glen Affric. Donald Murchison marched his main force to the top of Mam Attadale while a relative of his, Kenneth Murchison went forward with 13 men, all armed with muskets to prepare for an ambush at Coille Bhan (White Wood).

== Battle ==
Captain McNeil with 18 men of his government force advanced on Kenneth Murchison's position. They received fire in which several of the government troops were wounded and one was killed. However, McNeil persisted in attacking his enemy and eventually he defeated them and Kenneth Murchison's men withdrew, as they were unable to resist any further.

However, although Captain McNeil had defeated this advance force, he soon heard of the larger group of Mackenzies waiting at Attadale under the command of Donald Murchison. As a result, McNeil and his men returned to Inverness.

== Aftermath ==
No further attempts were made on Mackenzie of Seaforth's lands.

General George Wade, in his report to the King in 1725, stated that the Mackenzie of Seaforth tenants, who were formerly reputed to be the richest of any in the Highlands, had now become poor, by neglecting their business, and applying themselves to the use of arms. "The rents" he says, "continue to be collected by one Donald Murchison, a servant of the late Earl's, who annually remits or carries the same to his master in France. The tenants, when in a condition, are said to have sent him free gifts in proportion to their circumstances, but are now a year and a-half in arrear of rent".

William Mackenzie, 5th Earl of Seaforth did not return from exile in France to Scotland until 1726.
