= Jacobite rising of 1719 =

Failed attempt to restore the House of Stuart to the British throne

Jacobite Rising of 1719
- Part of Jacobite risings and War of the Quadruple Alliance
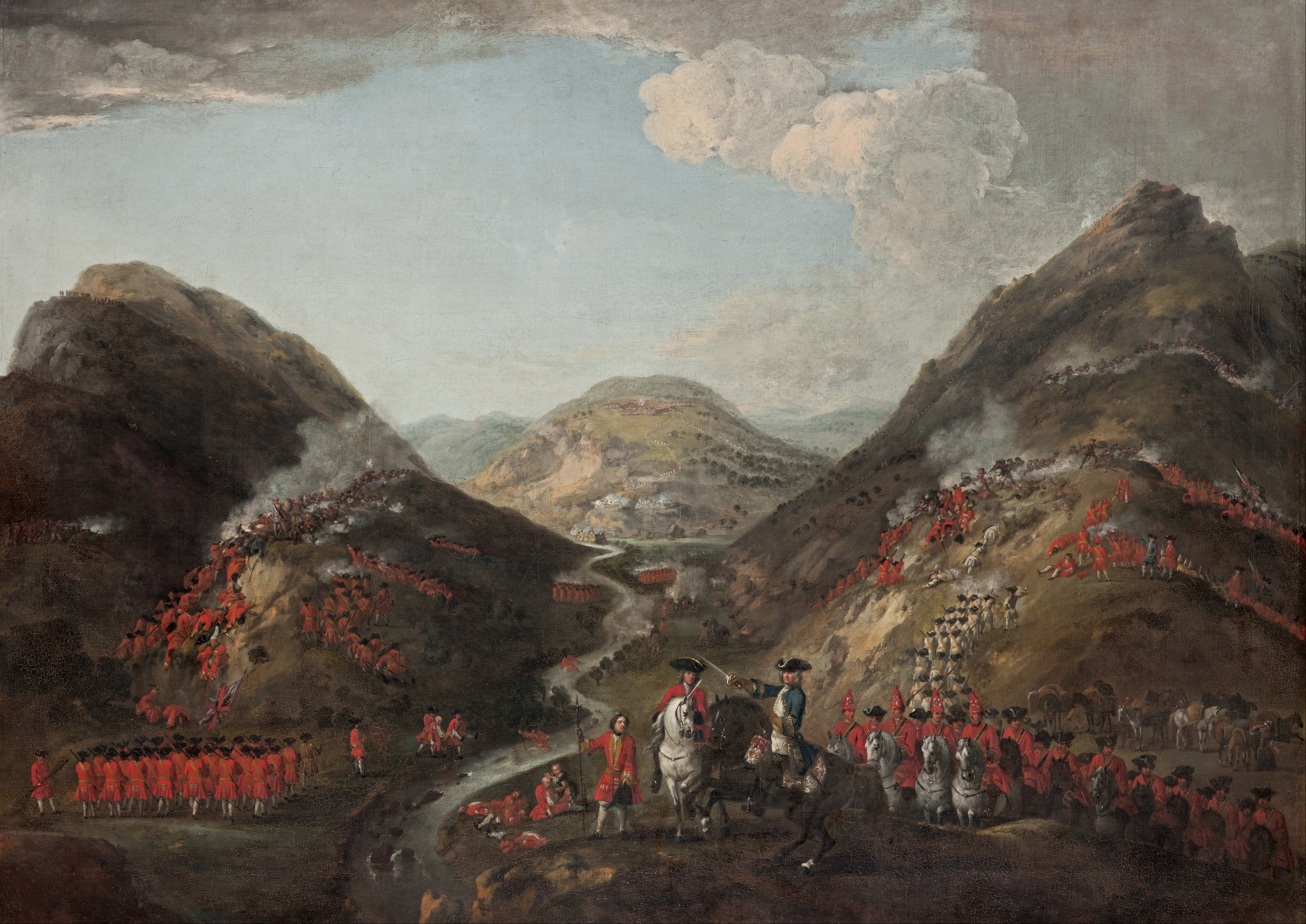
- The Battle of Glenshiel 1719, Peter Tillemans
Date	1719
Location	Scottish Highlands, Kingdom of Great Britain
Result	Government victory

Belligerents
Jacobites Spain	(Kingdom of Great Britain) British Government

Commanders and leaders
George Keith; William Murray; Earl of Seaforth; Nicolás Bolaño (surrendered)	Joseph Wightman; Chester Boyle; Donald Murchinson; Kenneth Murchinson

The Jacobite Rising of 1719 was a failed attempt to put the exiled James Francis Edward Stuart on the throne of Great Britain. Part of a series of Jacobite risings between 1689 and 1745, it was supported by Spain, then at war with Britain during the War of the Quadruple Alliance.

The main part of the plan called for 5,000 Spanish troops to land in South West England, with a subsidiary landing in Scotland by an expeditionary force, led by Charles XII of Sweden. To facilitate this, Scottish Jacobites would capture the port of Inverness; however, Charles' death in November 1718 ended Swedish involvement, and rendered the Scottish operation largely irrelevant.

Despite this, in late March, a small force of Spanish marines and Jacobite exiles landed in Stornoway. Learning that the invasion of England had been cancelled when the Spanish invasion fleet was severely damaged by storms, they decided to march on Inverness as planned. They were intercepted and defeated at the Battle of Glen Shiel in June, ending the Rising in Scotland.

Jacobite leaders felt the failed revolt had so undermined the Stuart cause that it had ended any real prospects for their restoration. Over the next few years, senior exiles including Henry St John, 1st Viscount Bolingbroke, and the William Mackenzie, 5th Earl of Seaforth, accepted pardons and returned home. Others, such as James and George Keith, ended active participation in Jacobite plots and took employment with other states.

== Background ==
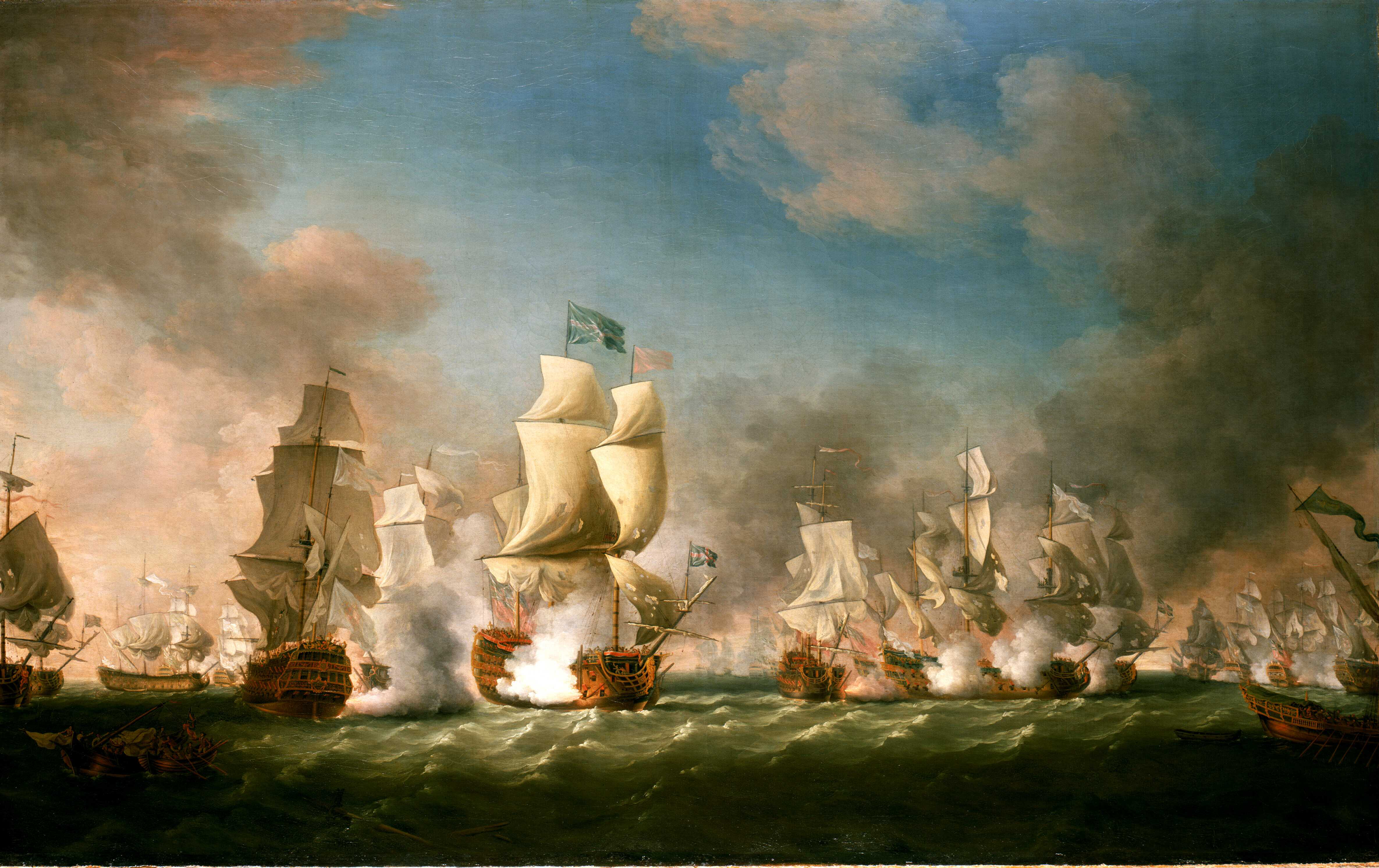
The Battle of Cape Passaro, August 1718; Spanish defeat in the Mediterranean prompted Alberoni's support for the 1719 Rising

When the War of the Spanish Succession ended in 1713, Spain lost its Italian possessions of Sicily and Sardinia. Their recovery was a priority for Giulio Alberoni, the new Chief Minister, and Sardinia was reoccupied in 1717. When Spanish troops landed on Sicily in July 1718, the Royal Navy destroyed the Spanish fleet at the Battle of Cape Passaro, beginning the War of the Quadruple Alliance.

After the death of Louis XIV in 1715, the 1716 Anglo-French Treaty expelled the Stuarts from France and permitted a smooth succession by George I. The 1715 Jacobite Rising showed they retained significant support, and Alberoni sought to use this to divert British resources from the Mediterranean. He devised a plan whereby 5,000 Spanish troops under the exiled James Butler, 2nd Duke of Ormonde would land in South-West England, march on London and restore James Stuart.

Ormonde added another element, based on his involvement in peace talks between Sweden and Russia. Charles XII of Sweden was then in dispute with Hanover over territories in Germany, an example of the problems caused by George I's being ruler of both Hanover and Britain. A small Scottish force would secure Inverness, allowing a Swedish expeditionary force to disembark; Charles' death in November 1718 ended Swedish participation, and the entire purpose of the Scottish rising.

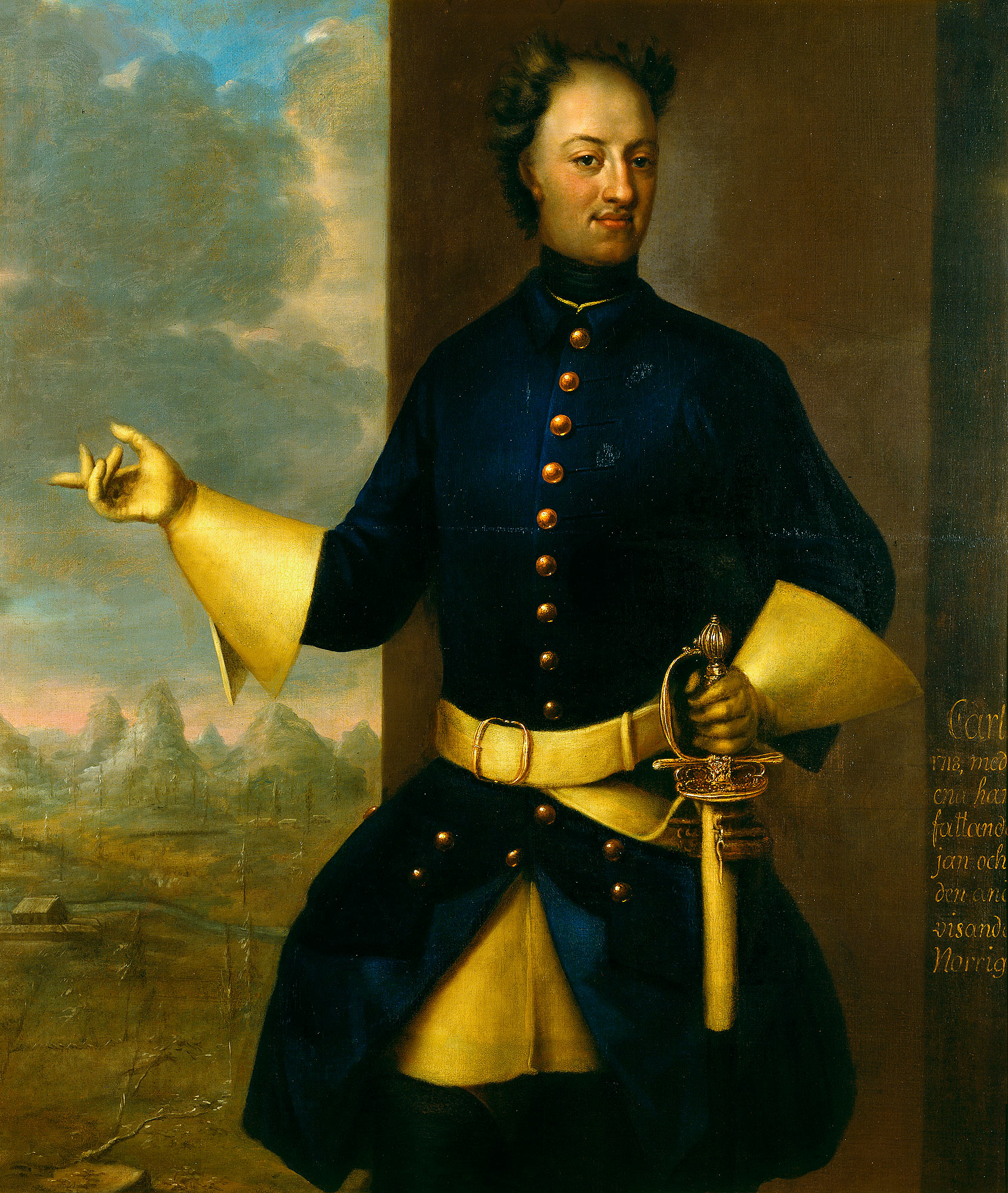
Charles XII of Sweden; his death in November 1718 ended Swedish participation, and the purpose of the Scottish rising

Preparations were carried out in Cádiz, while Ormonde and James waited in Coruña. A Royal Navy squadron took up station outside Cádiz, watching the Spanish fleet; as the delays continued, Ormonde wrote a series of increasingly pessimistic letters to Alberoni, telling him the plan was no longer viable. Unlike many of his contemporaries, Alberoni had direct experience of amphibious operations, and historians question whether he ever intended to follow through with the invasion plan. In any case, it was only part of a far more ambitious plan to reshape Europe; this included partitioning the Ottoman Empire, and replacing Philippe II, Duke of Orléans, then Regent of France, with Philip V of Spain.

Cape Passaro demonstrated the Royal Navy's power in far less favourable circumstances, making it unlikely the Spanish fleet would even reach England, let alone be allowed to disembark large numbers of troops. As the French demonstrated on numerous occasions, a threatened invasion was as useful in occupying the Royal Navy and far less risky, which would explain Alberoni's apparent lack of concern at the delays. The fleet left Cádiz in late March, but was severely damaged by a two-day storm off Cape Finisterre. It put into Coruña on 29 March, where it remained.

The Scottish landing was commanded by George Keith, who left Pasajes on 8 March, accompanied by 300 Spanish marines aboard two frigates. They landed at Stornoway in the Isle of Lewis, where they were joined by a group of exiles from France; these included the Earl of Seaforth, James Keith, the Marquess of Tullibardine, Lord George Murray and John Cameron of Lochiel. Britain later complained about the French allowing them free passage; one suggestion is they did so hoping to reduce expensive pensions granted by Louis XIV to Jacobite exiles.

Tullibardine wanted to wait until they heard from Ormonde, while Keith urged capturing Inverness before the garrison was warned. His view prevailed; on 13 April, they landed at Lochalsh in Mackenzie territory, and set up base in Eilean Donan. Here they learned of Ormonde's failure; as commander of Jacobite land forces, Tullibardine recommended retreat, which Keith prevented by ordering the frigates back to Spain. Left with few options, the Jacobites prepared to march on Inverness, with around 1,000 men, including 400 Mackenzies, 150 Camerons, the Spaniards and other small groups. Having brought arms and ammunition for 2,000, the excess was stored at Eilean Donan, guarded by 40 Spanish marines. By mid April, 2,500 Dutch soldiers had also arrived in Britain. The Dutch Republic had sent these men in support of the British Government, although only a few of them would see action.

== Rising ==
=== Capture of Eilean Donan Castle ===
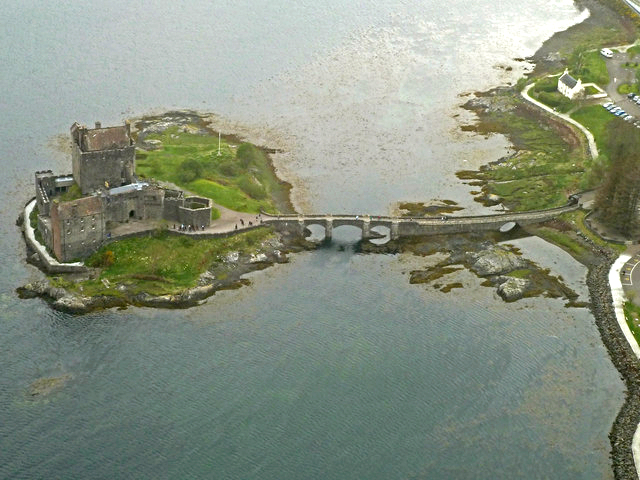
Eilean Donan, modern day

After hearing of the landing in Stornoway, five ships of the Royal Navy arrived in the area at the beginning of May. Since they were unaware the Spanish frigates had already left, this was a substantial force which included the 50-gun fourth-rates HMS Assistance, Worcester, Dartmouth and Enterprise plus the 24-gun sloop, Flamborough. While Assistance and Dartmouth patrolled the waters around Skye, Worcester, Enterprise and Flamborough anchored off Eilean Donan on the north side of Loch Duich early in the morning of Sunday 10 May. Seeing this, Tullibardine marched inland; their options were limited since they could not escape by sea while a government force under Joseph Wightman was advancing towards them from Inverness.

In the evening, a landing party captured the castle under cover of an intense cannonade and the prisoners were taken by Flamborough to Edinburgh. Captain Boyle of Worcester recorded them as 'an Irish captain, a Spanish lieutenant, a Spanish sergeant, thirty-nine Spanish soldiers and a Scots rebel.' After blowing up the castle, the ships remained in Loch Duich for the next two weeks, searching for rebels, while raiding the nearby town of Stromeferry and the island of Raasay.

=== Battle of Glen Shiel ===
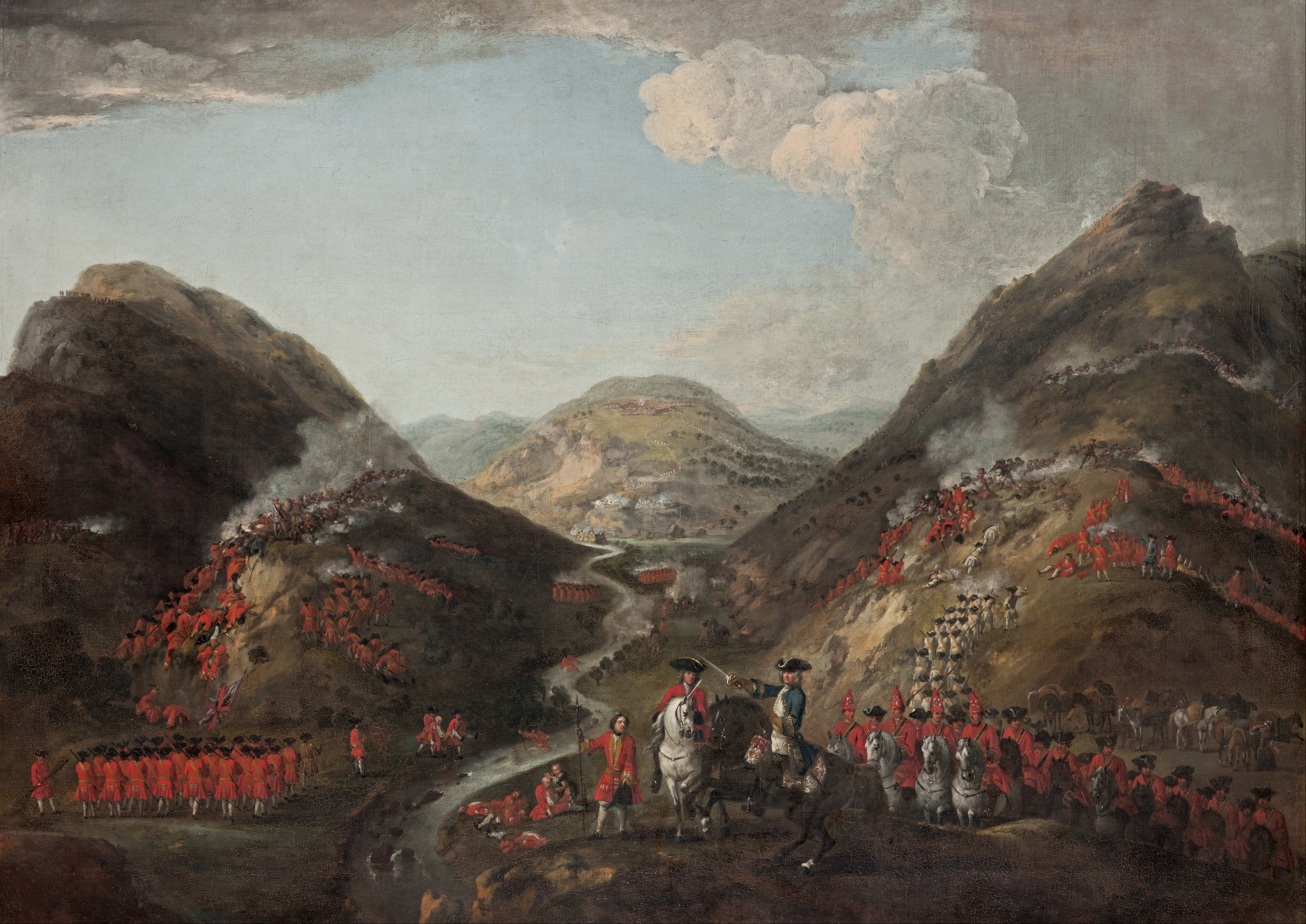
The Battle of Glen Shiel 10 June 1719

General Joseph Wightman left Inverness on 5 June for Glen Shiel with around 1,000 men and four Coehorn mortars. They reached Loch Cluanie on 9 June, less than 8 miles (13 km) from the Jacobite camp. Tullibardine blocked the pass running through the Five Sisters hills, with the Spanish in the centre and the Highlanders on the flanks behind a series of trenches and barricades.

Wightman's force arrived about 4:00 pm on 10 June, and began the attack an hour later by firing their mortars at the Jacobite flanking positions. This caused few casualties but the Scots had not encountered mortars before, allowing Wightman's infantry to advance up the hill to their lines, then use grenades to bomb them out of their positions. The Spanish stood their ground but had to withdraw up the mountain as their flanks gave way.

The battle lasted until 9:00 pm; several accounts claim the heather caught fire, and smoke combined with failing light enabled the bulk of the Scots to disappear into the night. The 274 Spaniards under Bolano surrendered next morning, whilst Lord George Murray, Seaforth and Tullibardine were wounded, but the Jacobite leaders also managed to escape. Despite the strength of the defensive positions, Wightman's victory was due to skilful use of mortars, superior firepower, and the aggression shown by his infantry.

Lord Carpenter, commander in Scotland, advised the government pursuing the rebels was impractical and that it was best to let them go. In a letter of 16 June 1719 to the Earl of Mar, Tullibardine provides a description of the battle and states 'it bid fair to ruin the King's Interest and faithful subjects in these parts.'

== Aftermath ==
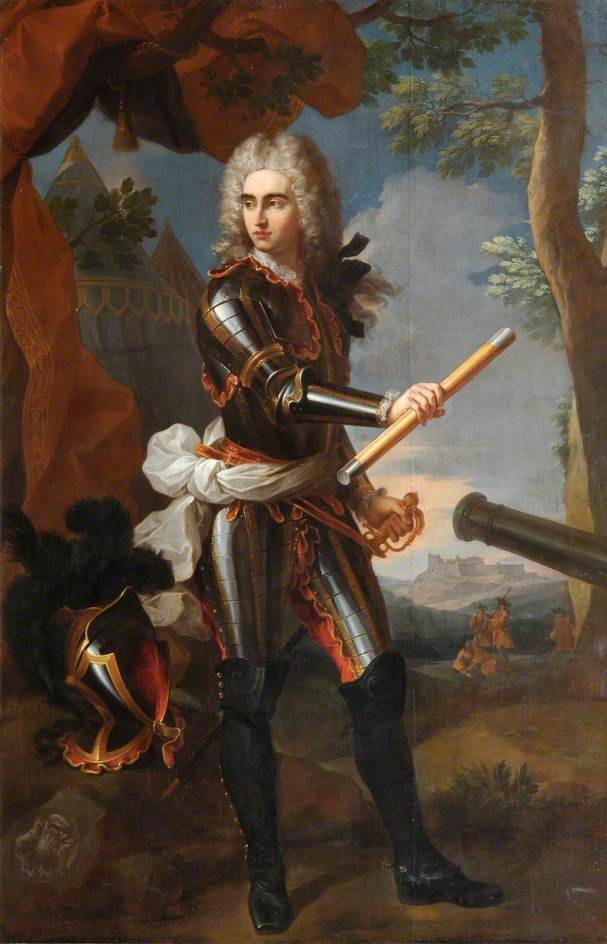
George Keith, 10th Earl Marischal, one of many senior Jacobites who thereafter pursued a career with other European powers

The captured Spanish were sent to Edinburgh Castle where they were imprisoned for four months. Then from Leith they sailed back to Spain for release. In October 1719, a British naval expedition captured the Spanish port of Vigo, held it for ten days, destroyed vast quantities of stores and equipment, then re-embarked unopposed, with huge quantities of loot. This demonstration of naval power led to Alberoni's dismissal, and ended Spanish support for the Jacobites.

The government followed Carpenter's recommendation, and largely left the Highland levies alone, but Seaforth's tenants continued paying rents to him even in exile. The Mackenzies twice defeated attempts by the Commission of Forfeited Estates to collect them, first at Glen Affric, then Coille Bhan. This showed the Highlands could not be governed without the co-operation of the clan chiefs, and only Seaforth's return from exile in 1726 restored government control in the Mackenzie territories.

Many exiles accepted pardons, including Viscount Bolingbroke and George Murray, while others took service elsewhere; George and James Keith both became Prussian generals. Ormonde lived quietly in Spain and Avignon until his death in November 1745; he was buried in Westminster Abbey in May 1746. Tullibardine remained in exile, took part in the 1745 Rising, and died in the Tower of London in July 1746. Despite swearing allegiance to George II, Murray also joined the '45, and died in the Dutch Republic in October 1760.

However, new laws actively discriminated against Non-Juring clergy, i.e. those who refused to swear allegiance to the Hanoverian regime. In 1690, more than half of the clergy were Non-Jurors and in theory deprived of their livings but many were protected by the local gentry. In 1673, Michael Fraser was appointed minister at Daviot and Dunlichty; despite being evicted in 1694, and joining the 1715 and 1719 Risings, he was still there when he died in 1726.

Previous attempts to reintegrate ministers like Michael Fraser by measures such as the 1712 Toleration Act had been resisted by the Kirk's General Assembly. After 1719, toleration changed to persecution, and many conformed as a result; Non-Juring Episcopalianism became a mark of Jacobite commitment and often associated with powerful local leaders, since their congregations required political protection for survival. A high percentage of both Lowlanders and Highlanders who participated in the 1745 Rebellion came from this element of Scottish society.

== Sources ==
- Black, Jeremy (2005). "Hanover and British Foreign Policy 1714-60". The English Historical Review. 120 (486): 303–339. doi:10.1093/ehr/cei117.
- Campbell, Peter R (2007). Perceptions of conspiracy in Conspiracy in the French Revolution. Manchester University Press. ISBN 978-0719074028.
- Dhondt, Frederik (2015). Balance of Power and Norm Hierarchy: Franco-British Diplomacy After the Peace of Utrecht. Brill - Nijhoff. ISBN 978-9004293748.
- Dickinson, HT, ed. (2006). Eighteenth Century Britain (Blackwell Companions to British History). John Wiley & Sons. ISBN 978-1405149631.
- Handley, Stuart (2006). "Butler, James, second duke of Ormond". Oxford Dictionary of National Biography (online ed.). Oxford University Press. doi:10.1093/ref:odnb/4193. (Subscription, Wikipedia Library access or UK public library membership required.)
- Harcourt-Smith, Simon (1944). Cardinal of Spain: The Life and Strange Career of Alberoni. Knopf.
- Historic Environment Scotland. "Battle of Glenshiel (BTL10)".
- Lenman, Bruce (1980). The Jacobite Risings in Britain 1689-1746. Eyre Methuen. ISBN 978-0413396501.
- Mackenzie, Alexander (1894). History of the Mackenzies: With Genealogies of the Principal Families of the Name. ISBN 9781976157844.
- Mackinnon, Donald (1954). The Clan Ross. W & A K Johnston.
- Ormonde, James Butler (1895). Dickson, William Kirk (ed.). The Jacobite Attempt Of 1719 Letters Of James Butler, Second Duke Of Ormonde (2015 ed.). Sagwan Press. ISBN 978-1296882174.
- Pittock, Murray GH (2006). "Murray, Lord George". Oxford Dictionary of National Biography (online ed.). Oxford University Press. doi:10.1093/ref:odnb/19605. (Subscription, Wikipedia Library access or UK public library membership required.)
- Simms, Brendan (2007). Three Victories and a Defeat: The Rise and Fall of the First British Empire, 1714-1783. Penguin. ISBN 978-0140289848.
- Simpson, Peter (1996). The Independent Highland Companies; 1603-1760. John Donald. ISBN 978-0859764322.
- Smout, C. T., ed. (1992). Scotland and the Sea; Jacobitism and Scottish Seas 1689-1791. John Donald Publishers Ltd. ISBN 978-0859763387.
- Szechi, Daniel (1994). The Jacobites: Britain and Europe, 1688-1788. Manchester University Press. ISBN 978-0719037740.
- Szechi, Daniel; Sankey, Margaret (2001). "Elite Culture and the Decline of Scottish Jacobitism 1716-1745". Past & Present (173).
- Spiers, Crang & Strickland; A Military History of Scotland (Edinburgh University Press, 2012);
- Strong, Rowan (2002). Episcopalianism in Nineteenth-Century Scotland: Religious Responses to a Modernizing Society. OUP Oxford. ISBN 978-0199249220.
- Wills, Rebecca (2001). The Jacobites and Russia, 1715-1750. Tuckwell Press Ltd. ISBN 978-1862321427.
- Oates, Jonathan (2007). "DUTCH FORCES IN EIGHTEENTH-CENTURY BRITAIN: A BRITISH PERSPECTIVE". Journal of the Society for Army Historical Research. 85 (341): 20–39.
- Oates, Jonathan (2020). Battles of the Jacobite Rebellions, Killiecrankie to Culloden. Pen & Sword Books.

== Bibliography ==
- Lynch, Michael, ed. (2011). Oxford Companion to Scottish History. OUP. ISBN 9780199693054.
- Spiers, Edward M; Crang, Jeremy; Strickland, Matthew (2012). A Military History of Scotland. Edinburgh University Press Series. ISBN 9780748633357.
