= William Tait (publisher) =

19th-century Scottish publisher

William Tait (1793–1864) was a 19th century Scottish publisher, based in Edinburgh. He was best known for Tait's Magazine.

== Life ==
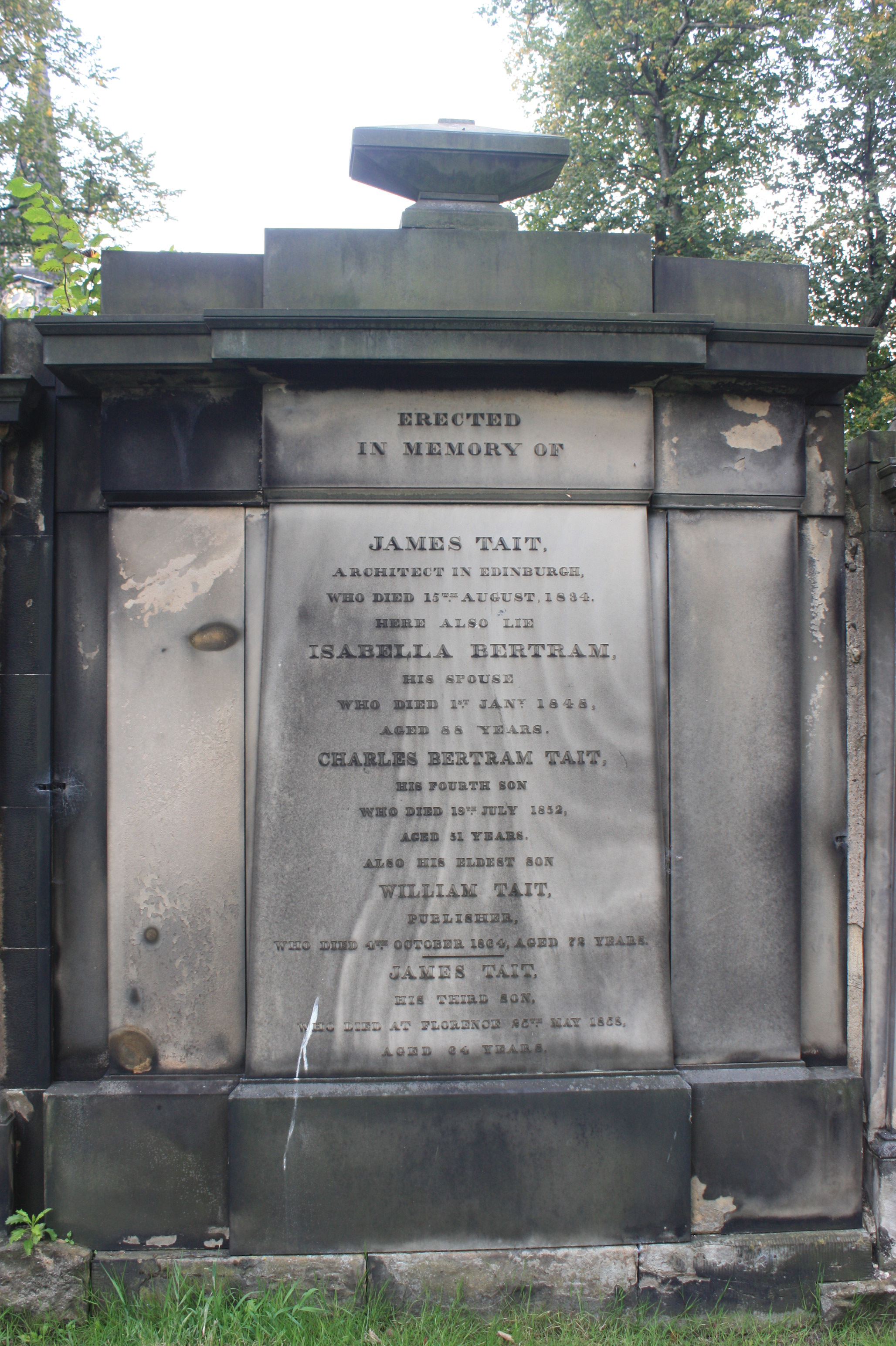
The grave of William Tait, St Cuthberts Churchyard, Edinburgh

The eldest son of Isabella Bertram and her husband, James Tait (1762–1834), an architect in Edinburgh, he was born there on 11 May 1793. After a short time at the University of Edinburgh, he was articled to a writer to the signet. Giving up on a legal career, by 1818 he had opened a bookshop at 78 Princes Street, Edinburgh with his brother Charles Bertram Tait, and shortly afterwards began publishing.

In 1833, Tait was elected to the first reformed town council of Edinburgh, and in the same year was sent to gaol for four days on 10 August for refusing to pay church rates, which were then a target in radical circles. His shop was a meeting-place and it is told that Sir Walter Scott and Thomas Carlyle were present at the same time without managing to meet. At this time he lived at 2, Walker Street in Edinburgh's West End.

In 1837, Tait was part of a group who helped create the Political Martyrs' Monument at Old Calton Burial Ground.

Tait retired from business in 1848, and bought the estate of Prior Bank, near Melrose, where he died on 4 October 1864. He is buried with his parents in St Cuthbert's Churchyard in Edinburgh at the west end of Princes Street. The grave lies on an outer wall of the southern extension.

== Works ==
Tait's major publications were: Thomas Brown's Philosophy of the Human Mind; Thomas Carlyle's German Romance; the collected edition of Jeremy Bentham's works, and Patrick Fraser Tytler's History of Scotland.

Tait's Edinburgh Magazine appeared in April 1832, and was issued monthly until December 1864. It was a literary and political magazine, its radical politics being its special feature, and giving it influence in Scotland, where it had for some time a larger circulation than any of its competitors. In 1834, it was reduced in price from 2s/6d (12.5p) to 1s (5p). At first, Tait was editor, but from 1834, when his magazine incorporated Johnstone’s, he used Christian Isobel Johnstone. Contributors included Thomas De Quincey, Leigh Hunt, Harriet Martineau, John Stuart Mill, and politicians such as Richard Cobden and John Bright who sympathised with the opinions of the magazine.
