= Ballantyne Press =

The Ballantyne Press was founded in 1799 by James Ballantyne and his brother John Ballantyne. James was particularly noted for his friendship with Sir Walter Scott who partially financed the printer after he moved his press to Edinburgh in 1803.
