= Easter Fearn =

Coordinates: 57°51′00″N 4°17′02″W

Easter Fearn is a small settlement in the Ross-shire area of the Highland council area in Scotland, on the A836 and B9176 roads it is 3 miles from Ardgay and is 6 miles from the A9. Easter Fearn is on the Dornoch Firth and is home to Strudie Hill. Easter Fearn is adjacent to Wester Fearn, Fearn Lodge and Mid Fearn, the Latter of which had a railway station.

The area around the settlement is wetlands and there are many hiking trails in the area including the aforementioned Strudie Hill. The Far North line railway passes through the settlement but it doesn't have nor ever had a station.
