= 87th Regiment of Foot (Keith's Highlanders) =

Scottish regiment

1760 portrait of a regimental captain

The 87th Regiment of Foot (Keith's Highlanders) was a line infantry regiment of the British Army. It was raised in 1759 at Perth, Scotland as Keith's Highlanders by Robert Murray Keith, who formed the regiment from three companies which had been detached from the 42nd Regiment of Foot in August 1759. In 1760 the regiment was numbered as the 87th Regiment of Foot and sent to Germany, where it fought at the Battle of Warburg on 31 July 1760 and the Battle of Villinghausen in July 1761. The regiment was sent home in late 1761 and was deployed to the Dutch Republic in November 1762. It returned to Scotland in December 1762 and was disbanded at Perth in July 1763.
