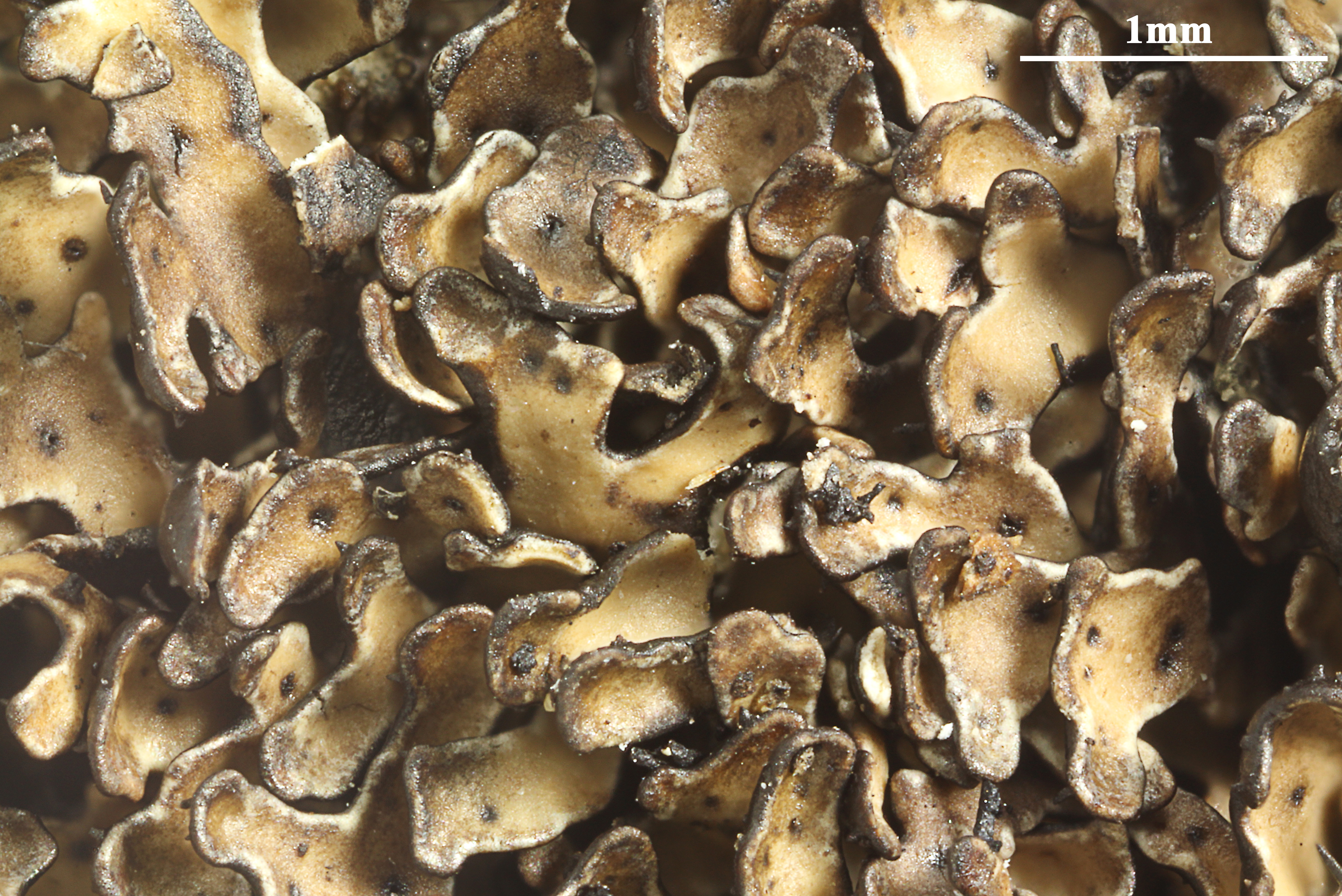
- Closeup of thallus surface; scale bar = 1 mm

Scientific classification
- Kingdom: Fungi
- Division: Ascomycota
- Class: Lecanoromycetes
- Order: Lecanorales
- Family: Parmeliaceae
- Genus: Parmelia
- Species: P. pinnatifida

Binomial name
- Parmelia pinnatifida Kurok. (1976)

Synonyms
- Parmelia omphalodes subsp. pinnatifida (Kurok.) Skult (1984)

= Parmelia pinnatifida =

Species of lichen

Parmelia pinnatifida is a species of foliose lichen in the family Parmeliaceae, first recognised as a distinct species in 1976. Originally classified as a variety of P. omphalodes in 1803, it is characterised by its small, circular body (thallus) with narrow, highly branched, overlapping lobes, and its grey to brown upper surface contrasting with a black underside. While its status as a separate species has been debated, modern genetic studies support this classification, though some uncertainty remains. The lichen typically grows on siliceous (silicon-rich) rocks, and occasionally on moss, plant debris, or tree bark, showing a preference for humid environments. It has been documented across Europe, North America, and Antarctica, with populations in mountainous regions, though its reported presence in the Southern Hemisphere requires further verification.

== Taxonomy ==
Parmelia pinnatifida was originally described as Parmelia omphalodes var. panniformis by Erik Acharius in 1803. However, its unique characteristics led Syo Kurokawa, in 1976, to recognise it as a distinct species. Kurokawa's reclassification was based on detailed studies of the lichen's morphology and chemistry, which revealed differences from closely related taxa such as P. omphalodes and P. discordans. The specific epithet pinnatifida highlights the species' hallmark repeatedly branched lobes, which form narrow, overlapping lobules.

Within the genus Parmelia (in the strict sense), P. pinnatifida belongs to a monophyletic group known as the P. saxatilis group. This clade includes several closely related species such as P. discordans, P. ernstiae, P. hygrophila, P. imbricaria, P. mayi, P. omphalodes, P. saxatilis, P. serrana, P. submontana, and P. sulymae. The group has its centre of diversity in temperate regions of the Northern Hemisphere but has achieved a cosmopolitan distribution.

The taxonomic status of P. pinnatifida has been subject to debate over the years. In 1987, Mason Hale, in his monograph of the genus Parmelia, treated it as a synonym of P. omphalodes, suggesting the morphological differences were insufficient to warrant species status. However, this classification was later challenged by molecular studies. Modern phylogenetic analyses, using both ITS (internal transcribed spacer) and β-tubulin gene sequences, have definitively demonstrated that P. pinnatifida and P. omphalodes are genetically distinct taxa, supporting Kurokawa's original classification as separate species. The development of molecular phylogenetic techniques has been crucial in resolving relationships within the P. saxatilis group, though some taxonomic uncertainties remain. While the status of P. pinnatifida as a distinct species is supported by a combination of morphological, chemical, and molecular evidence, some authors still consider P. pinnatifida to be merely a subspecies of P. omphalodes. This taxonomic uncertainty, combined with its morphological similarity to P. omphalodes, has historically led to P. pinnatifida being overlooked or misidentified in field surveys, potentially affecting our understanding of its true distribution.

== Description ==
Parmelia pinnatifida is characterised by a small, orbicular thallus that attaches loosely to its substrate. The thallus can vary in growth form from flat to cushion-forming. The species displays a grey to brown upper surface and a contrasting black lower surface. The thallus features narrow, highly branched lobes that are imbricate (overlapping like roof tiles) and somewhat ascending. These lobes measure 1–2 mm in width, with lobules measuring 0.1–0.3 mm in width.

The species lacks both soredia and isidia, reproductive structures common in many other lichens. The upper surface of the thallus has pseudocyphellae, small pore-like structures, which are white and linear to branched in form. These pseudocyphellae are predominantly located along the margins of the lobes, distinguishing it from P. omphalodes, where pseudocyphellae are found both marginally and laminally (on the flat upper surface).

The rhizines, root-like structures on the underside of the thallus, are simple or forked and help anchor the lichen to its substrate. Internally, the lichen has a white medulla. The chemical composition of P. pinnatifida includes several characteristic substances. The major lichen products are atranorin, salazinic acid, and consalazinic acid, while protolichesterinic acid is present as a minor substance. Some populations have been reported to contain trace amounts of galbinic and fumarprotocetraric acid, though these compounds are not consistently present across all specimens. These chemical compounds, particularly the combination and concentrations of different acids, help differentiate P. pinnatifida from other species in the P. omphalodes group. Thin-layer chromatography of P. pinnatifida reveals fatty acids similar to those in Parmelia expallida and Parmelia grayana.

== Similar species ==
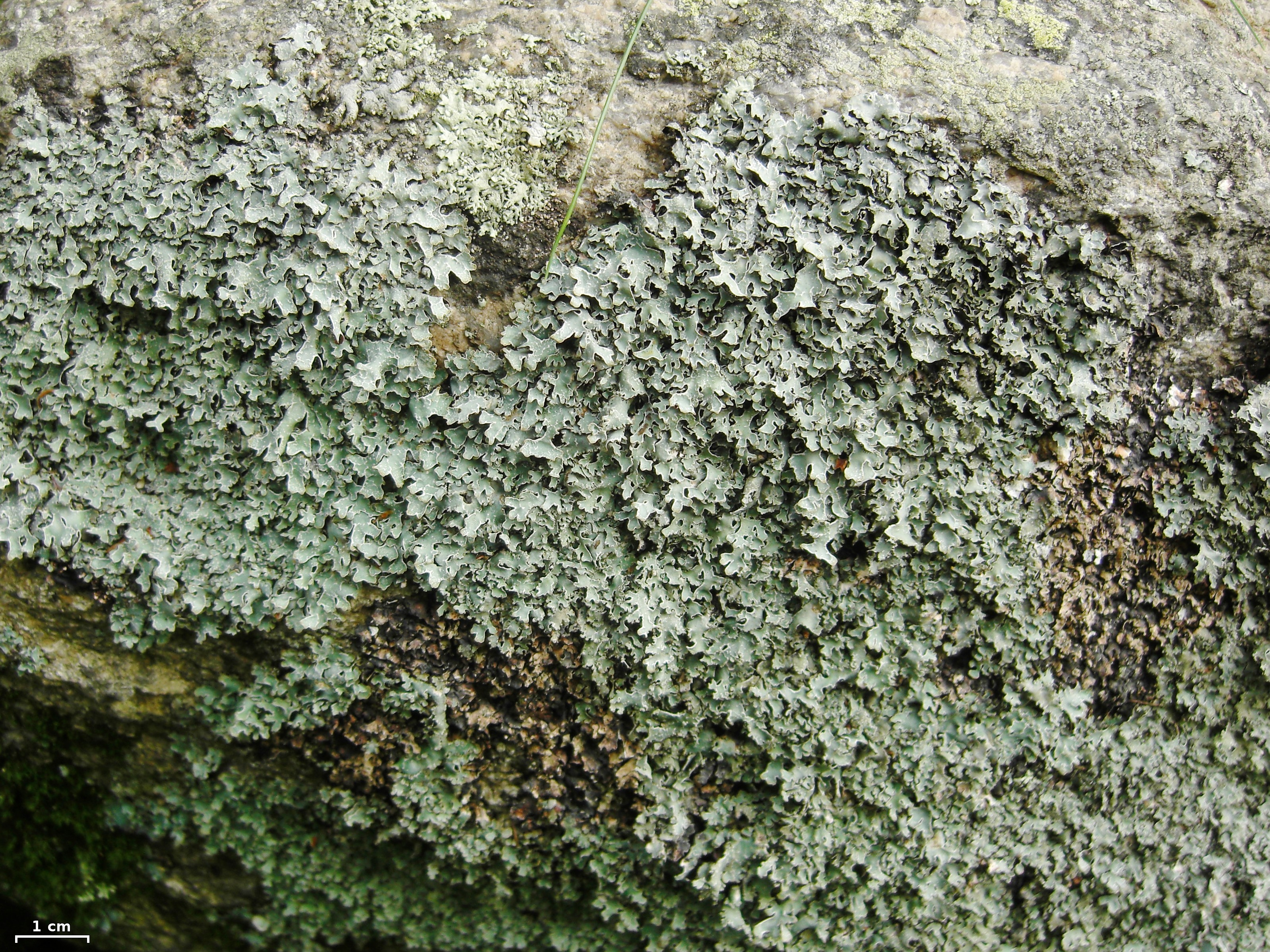
Parmelia omphalodes growing on rock, showing its broader, less densely branched lobes compared to P. pinnatifida

Parmelia pinnatifida can be confused with several morphologically similar species within the genus. P. discordans appears superficially similar but can be distinguished by its chemical composition, particularly the presence of protocetraric and lobaric acids, which are absent in P. pinnatifida.

Parmelia omphalodes shares some morphological features but differs in several key characteristics. While both species have pseudocyphellae, in P. omphalodes these structures occur both on the margins and across the upper surface (laminally), whereas in P. pinnatifida they are primarily marginal. The lobe structure also differs significantly between the two species, with P. pinnatifida having much narrower, more extensively branched lobes that are distinctively imbricated (overlapping) in multiple layers. This creates a more complex, layered appearance compared to P. omphalodes. Additionally, P. omphalodes lacks the distinctive marginal lobules characteristic of P. pinnatifida and contains lobaric acid as part of its chemical profile. Despite these morphological differences, recent phylogenetic analyses using ITS sequence data have been unable to clearly separate P. pinnatifida and P. omphalodes as distinct evolutionary lineages. This suggests that their taxonomic relationship may be more complex than previously thought and might require genome-wide data to fully resolve.

The arctic species P. skultii presents another challenge for identification, as it shares similar morphological and chemical traits with P. pinnatifida. However, P. skultii can be distinguished by its broader lobes, which can reach up to 8 mm in width, compared to the narrower lobes of P. pinnatifida. Furthermore, P. skultii has a distinctive chemical signature, containing equal concentrations of norstictic and salazinic acids, a feature not found in P. pinnatifida.

== Habitat and distribution ==
Parmelia pinnatifida has been recorded in various parts of Europe, including Sweden, Germany, and Switzerland. The species has also been documented in Austria, Finland, Norway, Romania, Slovakia, and Spain. Beyond Europe, it occurs in North America, with populations confirmed in Canada, Greenland, and the United States. While the species has been documented in Antarctica with molecular confirmation, its reported presence in southern South America and New Zealand requires additional studies to verify these distributions. The species was first discovered in Italy in 2019, where it was found in Val Brandet, a narrow secondary valley in north-western Val Camonica in the Orobic Alps. Prior to this discovery, the species was only known from the French and Austrian Alps.

The species shows a strong preference for siliceous rocks, making it primarily an epilithic lichen. While it predominantly colonises rock surfaces, specimens have been found growing on bryophytes and plant debris. In rare instances, it has been documented growing on tree bark, with one notable record on Norway spruce (Picea abies). In its Italian location, the species was found growing on a schist boulder at the edge of a pathway in a shady, moist and cool montane coniferous forest near a stream, demonstrating its preference for humid microhabitats.

In mountainous regions, P. pinnatifida can be particularly scarce. For example, in Poland, where it was first documented in 2016, the species is found exclusively in the Carpathian Mountains and the Świętokrzyskie Mountains, where it maintains small, isolated populations.
