= Parmelia neodiscordans =

Scientific classification
- Kingdom: Fungi
- Division: Ascomycota
- Class: Lecanoromycetes
- Order: Lecanorales
- Family: Parmeliaceae
- Genus: Parmelia
- Species: P. neodiscordans

Binomial name
- Parmelia neodiscordans Hale (1987)

Species of lichen-forming fungus

Parmelia neodiscordans is a species of saxicolous (rock-dwelling) foliose lichen in the family Parmeliaceae. Described in 1987 from Acadia National Park in Maine, this lichen has a limited distribution in eastern North America, occurring primarily at high elevations in the southern Appalachian Mountains but found near sea level in New England, with rare occurrences extending to the Yukon and parts of Canada. The species forms whitish-grey growths up to 8 cm (3 in) across on exposed siliceous rocks and is distinguished by its densely lobulated surface covered with small standing projections, as well as by its chemical composition, which differs from the similar-looking Parmelia discordans with which it was historically confused.

== Taxonomy ==
Parmelia neodiscordans was described by Mason Hale in 1987 from rock-dwelling material collected on Deer Mountain, Acadia National Park, Maine (holotype: M.E. Hale 37496, housed at the United States National Herbarium). Hale noted that early collections had been misidentified as P. discordans because of an erroneous spot test; correct chemistry showed a different profile. He separated the new species from P. discordans by its consistently whitish thallus (not darkening deep brown) and from P. omphalodes (another pale Parmelia found in the Appalachian Mountains) by its smaller size and densely, uniformly lobulate surface.

== Description ==
The thallus of P. neodiscordans is adnate to loosely attached on rock, whitish gray (sometimes browning with age) and 5–8 cm (2–3 in) across. Lobes are more or less linear, crowded and overlapping, 1–2 mm wide. The upper surface is flat but strongly lobulate along the margins and partly on the faces; the small lobules are 1–2 mm wide and 0.5–3.0 mm long and tend to stand slightly erect. Pale pores (pseudocyphellae) are inconspicuous, appearing as a narrow whitish rim along the lobe edges. The undersurface is jet black with sparse to moderate rhizines that are coarse, simple, and to 1 mm long. Asexual structures are uncommon: pycnidia are rare (about 90 μm in diameter) and produce cylindrical conidia 6–7 μm long. Apothecia have not been seen in this species. The chemistry is characterised by atranorin and fumarprotocetraric acid, with additional unidentified fatty acids.

== Habitat and distribution ==
A rock-dwelling (saxicolous) species, P. neodiscordans occurs at high elevations, more than 1,500 m (4,900 ft), in the southern Appalachian range but approaches near sea level in New England. Confirmed records include Maine (the type locality), New York, and West Virginia; within this region it inhabits exposed, humid sites on siliceous rock. It is rare in western North America, with three records from the Yukon. In Canada, it is also considered rare, with a few collections from Ontario and Quebec.
