= Parmelia marmariza =

Scientific classification
- Kingdom: Fungi
- Division: Ascomycota
- Class: Lecanoromycetes
- Order: Lecanorales
- Family: Parmeliaceae
- Genus: Parmelia
- Species: P. marmariza

Binomial name
- Parmelia marmariza Nyl. (1890)

Synonyms
- Parmelia submarmariza Asahina (1953); Parmelia marmariza f. angustifolia Asahina (1951)

Species of lichen-forming fungus

Parmelia marmariza is a species of corticolous (bark-dwelling) foliose lichen in the family Parmeliaceae. Originally described from Japan in 1890, this lichen is widespread across East Asia, occurring in Japan, Taiwan, Nepal, and parts of China, where it grows in humid temperate to subtropical forests. The species forms whitish to greenish-grey crusty growths closely attached to tree bark, characterised by lobes with conspicuous black-rimmed margins and numerous small pale pores that often merge into a network of ridges. It is distinguished from related Asian species by its dense covering of small raised pores and its chemical composition, which includes several diagnostic compounds detectable through standard lichen chemistry tests.

== Taxonomy ==
Parmelia marmariza was described by William Nylander in 1890 from material collected in Japan by Sigfrid Almquist. Later names, Parmelia marmariza f. angustifolio (1951), and Parmelia submarmariza (1953), published by Yasuhiko Asahina, were based on minor morphological variations and are now treated as synonyms of Parmelia marmariza. Mason Hale, in his 1987 Parmelia monograph, regarded this taxon as a distinct Asian member of Parmelia, differing from related species such as P. adaugescens by its smaller, more crowded pseudocyphellae and slightly smaller ascospores.

== Description ==
Parmelia marmariza forms firm, closely attached thalli on bark, typically 8–12 cm across, coloured whitish to greenish mineral grey. Lobes are somewhat linear to somewhat lobate, 2–8 mm wide, overlapping and sometimes short, with a smooth to faintly wrinkled upper surface that is shiny and continuous. The margins are conspicuously black-rimmed, and the upper cortex bears numerous raised pale pores (pseudocyphellae) that are 0.2–0.5 mm long, occurring both on the lobe margins and surfaces, often merging to form a network of ridges.

The lower surface is black and densely covered with rhizines that are simple to forked, 1–2 mm long. Pycnidia are common, producing cylindrical conidia 6–8 micrometres (μm) long. Apothecia (fruiting bodies) are somewhat sessile and 5–12 mm in diameter, with a dark brown disc that becomes flat and split with age; the thalline margin is wrinkled (rugose) and marked by pseudocyphellae. The hymenium is 55–60 μm tall, and ascospores measure 8–9 × 12–14 μm, with a wall about 1 μm thick.

Chemically, P. marmariza contains atranorin, chloroatranorin, salazinic acid, and consalazinic acid. The species is distinguished from related Asian Parmelia species by its dense, small pseudocyphellae and relatively thick, rugose thalline margins.

== Habitat and distribution ==
Parmelia marmariza is an Asian species that grows on tree bark in humid temperate to subtropical forests. It is widespread in Japan, where it occurs in several provinces, and is also found in Taiwan and Nepal. Reports from Anhui and Shaanxi provinces in China confirm its broader East Asian range.

The species is most common in areas with high rainfall and moderate temperatures, often in coastal or montane environments where humidity remains steady throughout the year. It typically colonises smooth-barked trees and occasionally other woody substrates. Specimens from different parts of its range show minor variation in the density of pseudocyphellae and spore size, likely reflecting environmental influences rather than taxonomic differences.
