= Parmelia isidiiveteris =

Scientific classification
- Kingdom: Fungi
- Division: Ascomycota
- Class: Lecanoromycetes
- Order: Lecanorales
- Family: Parmeliaceae
- Genus: Parmelia
- Species: †P. isidiiveteris

Binomial name
- †Parmelia isidiiveteris Poinar, E.B.Peterson & Platt (2000)

Species of lichen

Parmelia isidiiveteris is a fossilised species of foliose lichen in the family Parmeliaceae. It was found in Dominican amber and described as a new species in 2000. It was tentatively placed in the genus Parmelia although its true generic placement is difficult to determine with only a single specimen available for analysis.

== Taxonomy ==
The fossil was discovered in Dominican amber and formally described as a new species in 2000 by George Poinar Jr., Eric Peterson, and Jamie Platt. The holotype specimen (Poinar AF9-17B) is kept at the University of Oregon.

Because of its resemblance to modern-day members of Parmelia, the fossil lichen has been placed provisionally in that genus, although the authors acknowledge that without sacrificing more of the single available specimen for analysis, it is impossible to assert this definitively. Although the authors noted "striking resemblance" to some members of Hypotrachyna, they chose to tentatively group the fossil taxon in Parmelia because of the mostly simple (i.e., unbranched) rhizines, a trait characteristic of that genus. Some later authors have opined, however, that this taxon, and another fossil lichen described concurrently, Parmelia ambra, do not belong to the genus concept of the Parmelia as presently circumscribed, although there is agreement that the Parmeliaceae is the appropriate family.

Based on what types of organisms are used for dating, Dominican amber dates from 15–20 million years ago (based on foraminifera fossils), to 30–45 million years (based on coccolith fossils). Because lichens are scarce in the fossil record, specimens like this are often used as calibration points for molecular clock analyses to improve understanding of lichen evolution.

== Description ==
The fossil lichen has a thallus comprising dichotomously branched lobes with a smooth, slightly convex. The lobes measure 1.0–1.35 mm wide at the internode. The upper thallus surface is shiny and greenish in colour, lacking pseudocyphellae (tiny pores). Isidia are unevenly scattered on the thallus surface. The underside of the thallus is black with dark rhizines measuring 0.3–0.7 mm long. Neither apothecia nor pycnidia are apparent on the fossil. The isidia are 300–500 μm high and 40–50 μm in diameter, and leave pits on the surface of the cortex where they have been broken off. The specimen also has light-coloured squamules (scales) similar to those found in genus Cladonia.
