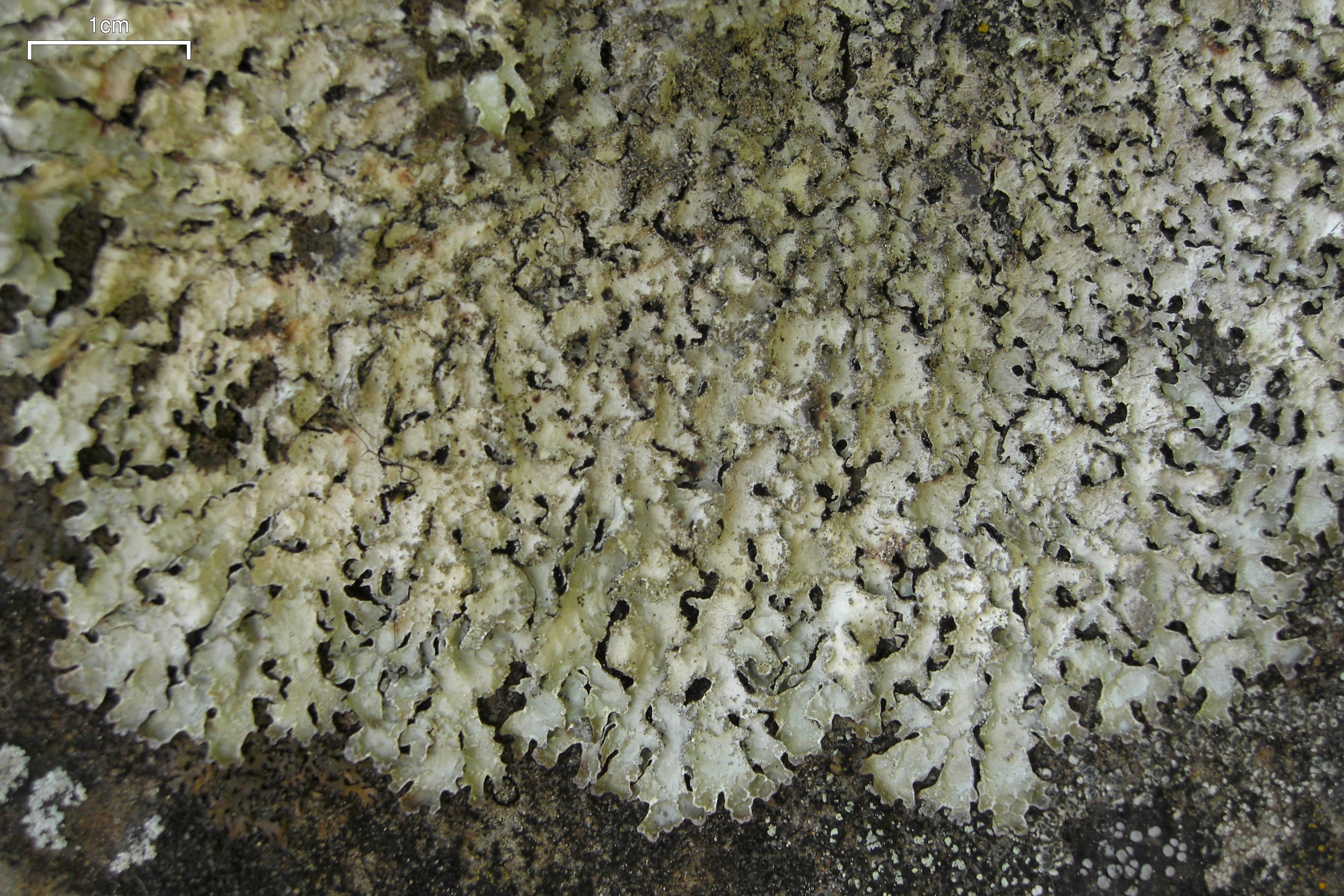
- in Wells Gray region, British Columbia, Canada

Conservation status
- Secure (NatureServe)

Scientific classification
- Kingdom: Fungi
- Division: Ascomycota
- Class: Lecanoromycetes
- Order: Lecanorales
- Family: Parmeliaceae
- Genus: Parmelia
- Species: P. fraudans

Binomial name
- Parmelia fraudans (Nyl.) Nyl. (1869)

Synonyms
- Parmelia saxatilis * fraudans Nyl. (1861)

= Parmelia fraudans =

Species of lichen

Parmelia fraudans is a species of foliose lichen in the family Parmeliaceae. It is found in Europe and North America, where it grows on rocks.

== Taxonomy ==
The lichen was originally named as a subspecies of Parmelia saxatilis by William Nylander in 1861. He noted its occurrence on rocks among mosses in North Savo as well as in Kajaani. Nylander promoted it to species status in 1869.

Molecular phylogenetic analysis shows that Parmelia fraudans is a member of the Parmelia sulcata species group, and it is estimated to have begun diversification during the Pliocene, about 3.3 million years ago.

== Description ==
The foliose (leafy) thallus of Parmelia fraudans is tightly attached to its substrate, typically measuring 4–16 cm (1.6–6.3 in) in diameter. The brittle, flat lobes that comprise the thallus range from contiguous to overlapping, and are 1–4 mm wide, with truncated tips. The colour of the upper thallus surface is grey to yellowish grey, while texturally it is smooth to delicately pitted, with pseudocyphellae and soredia. The soredia, which somewhat resemble isidia, are abundant and are concentrated along the margins of the thallus. The medulla is white. The thallus undersurface is black in the centre, becoming brown towards the margins. Numerous black rhizines (both branched and unbranched) act as holdfasts. Apothecia are rarely observed; when present, they measure 2–4 mm in diameter and have a dark brown disc, with soredia typically on the apothecial margin. The ascospores have an ellipsoid shape and measure 10–12 by 5–6 μm.

The expected results of standard chemical spot tests on Parmelia fraudans are cortex K+ (yellow), C−, KC−, P+ (yellow); medulla K+ (yellow becoming deep red), C−, KC−, and P+ (orange). Secondary compounds found in the lichen are atranorin and chloroatranorin in the cortex (and sometimes usnic acid in the soralia), and salazinic acid as a major component of the medulla, with minor amounts of consalazinic acid and protolichesterinic acid. The yellowish tone of the soralia caused by usnic acid is unique in the genus Parmelia.

== Habitat and distribution ==
Parmelia fraudans occurs in Europe and North America, where it grows on rocks. Its North American distribution extends from Alaska south to Mexico. Although it is generally rare in Eastern Canada, it was reported as new to Nova Scotia in 2022. In Europe, it has been recorded from the Czech Republic, Estonia, France, Finland, Greenland, Norway, Russia, Sweden, and Slovakia. In the 2019 red list of Estonian lichens, it was classified as a critically endangered species due to a reduction of its range and a decrease in population size (compared to its 2008 assessment).
