= Parmelia skultii =

Scientific classification
- Kingdom: Fungi
- Division: Ascomycota
- Class: Lecanoromycetes
- Order: Lecanorales
- Family: Parmeliaceae
- Genus: Parmelia
- Species: P. skultii

Binomial name
- Parmelia skultii Hale (1987)

Species of lichen

Parmelia skultii is a species of terricolous and saxicolous (soil- and rock-dwelling) foliose lichen in the family Parmeliaceae. Described from Alaska in 1987, this lichen is primarily a high-latitude species of the North Pacific–Arctic region, occurring from the Aleutian Islands through Alaska and across to Greenland, Svalbard, and Russia, with a disjunct population discovered in Montana's Bitterroot Range extending its range about 2,500 km southward. The species forms fragile rosette-shaped growths 6–10 cm across, typically growing among mosses or on rocks in windswept locations, and is distinguished by its broader lobes with marginal pores, a white frosty coating that often develops with age, and its distinctive chemistry that includes norstictic acid—features that help separate it from the related Parmelia omphalodes.

== Taxonomy ==
Parmelia skultii was described as a new species by Mason Hale in 1987. The epithet honors Henrik Skult, who had earlier drawn attention to a northern population within the Parmelia omphalodes complex that contained norstictic acid and differed consistently in morphology. Skult described this taxon, collected from the Northwest Territories, as the subspecies Parmelia omphalodes subsp. glacialis. Hale designated a holotype from the west wall of a pass at Anaktuvuk Pass, Alaska (on soil over rocks; G. A. Llano 299a, housed at the United States National Herbarium). He separated P. skultii from typical P. omphalodes by its broader lobes with marginal pseudocyphellae and the frequent presence of a frosty (pruinose) coating, together with the distinctive chemistry. Hale also discussed Skult's arctic material (described as Parmelia omphalodes subsp. glacialis in 1985), arguing that the combination of traits supports recognition at species rank.

== Description ==
The thallus of Parmelia skultii usually grows on soil among mosses or on rocks and is rather fragile, forming rosettes 6–10 cm across. Its lobes are more or less linear and fairly short, 2–4 mm wide, crowded and overlapping, and often develop small secondary lobules (laciniae). The upper surface is plane, smooth to finely wrinkled, commonly becoming white-pruinose with age; the lobe margins bear pseudocyphellae (narrow, pale breaks in the cortex that aid gas exchange) that are more or less continuous but inconspicuous, and laminal pseudocyphellae are rare. The lower surface is black and shiny with sparse to moderate rhizines (root-like holdfasts) that are simple to forked and 0.5–2 mm long. Apothecia do not occur in this species. Pycnidia are uncommon (about 90–110 μm in diameter) and produce cylindrical, rod-shaped conidia 6–8 μm long. The medullary chemistry includes atranorin and salazinic acid together with norstictic acid, often in amounts equal to or greater than salazinic; consalazinic, protolichesterinic, fumarprotocetraric, and stictic acids may be present in trace to minor amounts, along with a few unidentified substances.

== Habitat and distribution ==
Hale considered P. skultii a high-latitude species, especially near oceanic coasts. Records span the North Pacific–Arctic region from the Aleutian Islands east and north to Alaska and west to Novaya Zemlya. It grows on soil (often among mosses) as well as on rock, consistent with the holotype habitat at Anaktuvuk Pass. In eastern North America, it occurs south to about 60° N. A disjunct occurrence of the lichen was found in Montana, extending the range about 2,500 km (1,600 mi) to the south of the nearest Alaskan sites. The disjunct record is from the Bitterroot Range, Ravalli County, at the upper Bear Creek Canyon overlook on a subalpine, windswept granitic knob at 2,165 m (7,103 ft) elevation, above a glaciated canyon; the area has a somewhat oceanic climate owing to Pacific influence across northern Idaho and northwest Montana. In Europe, P. skultii has been recorded from Greenland, Russia, and Svalbard.
