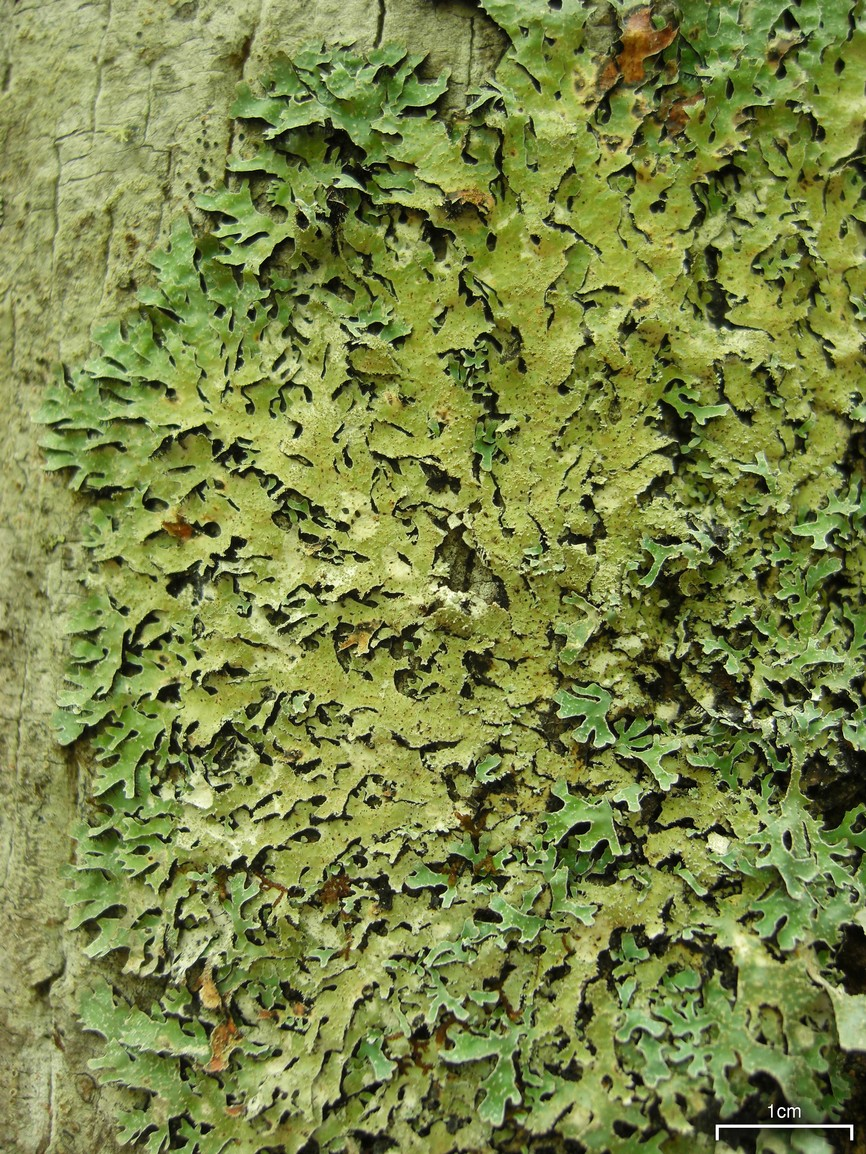
- on young Liriodendron trunk in open regenerating forest

Conservation status
- Least Concern (IUCN 3.1)

- Secure (NatureServe)

Scientific classification
- Kingdom: Fungi
- Division: Ascomycota
- Class: Lecanoromycetes
- Order: Lecanorales
- Family: Parmeliaceae
- Genus: Parmelia
- Species: P. squarrosa

Binomial name
- Parmelia squarrosa Hale (1971)

= Parmelia squarrosa =

Species of lichen-forming fungus

Parmelia squarrosa, commonly known as the bottlebrush shield lichen, is a species of foliose lichen in the family Parmeliaceae. It occurs in east Asia, Europe, and eastern North America, where it typically grows on tree bark, much less frequently on rocks, and rarely on moss. Because of its abundance, widespread distribution, and stable populations, it has been assessed as a species of least concern by the International Union for Conservation of Nature. Parmelia saxatilis is quite similar in appearance Parmelia squarrosa and the latter was quite often confused with the former, especially in herbarium collections. Molecular phylogenetic analysis proved the genetic distinctness between the two species, which are morphologically distinguished by difference in rhizine structure.

== Taxonomy ==
The lichen was described as a new species in 1971 by American mycologist Mason Hale. The type specimen was collected by Hale in Shenandoah National Park, Virginia, USA, at an altitude of 900 m (3,000 ft); there it was found growing on white oak (Quercus alba). In terms of important morphological characteristics of the lichen, and its main distinguishing feature from the similar Parmelia saxatilis), Hale emphasized the squarrose (with many short, more or less perpendicular lateral branches) structure of the rhizines. This feature is referenced in the species epithet squarrosa. In North America, it is known colloquially as the bottlebrush shield lichen.

Phylogenetically, Parmelia squarrosa groups together in a clade with P. sulcata and P. fertilis. These early (2004) molecular phylogenetic results demonstrated P. squarrosa to be clearly genetically distinct from P. saxatilis.

== Description ==
The thallus is adnate to loosely adnate on trees, less commonly on rocks, rarely on moss. It is greenish to whitish mineral grey, with divaricate, contiguous, or imbricate lobes measuring 1–5 mm wide. Upper surface is flat to pitted (foveolate) with laminal and marginal pseudocyphellae often forming a reticulate network; the isidia are cylindrical, measuring up to 0.5 mm tall and becoming dense in the older, central part of the thallus. Rhizines are squarrosely branched (simple at the lobe margins). Pycnidia and apothecia are uncommon; ascospores measure 13–15 by 8–9 μm.

The lichen contains the secondary compounds atranorin, salazinic acid and consalazinic acid. The expected results of standard chemical spot tests are cortex: K+ (yellow), and medulla: K+ (yellow changing to red), C−, PD+ (orange).

== Distribution ==
Parmelia squarrosa is distributed widely in North America, primarily in the eastern region including the Great Lakes-Appalachian area, as well as in western North America. Its distribution is more temperate and southern compared to P. saxatilis, with its range extending south to Arkansas, Alabama, and South Carolina. However, in some areas such as the Great Lakes through New York and New England to Quebec and Newfoundland, it overlaps with P. saxatilis. P. squarrosa also has a wider distribution in the southern Appalachians, extending to the lower foothills, unlike P. saxatilis and P. sulcata which are restricted to high mountain habitats.

In 1985, Parmelia squarrosa was recorded in the western Austrian Alps and southern Switzerland for the first time, growing on rock. It is also widespread in eastern Asia, with reports of its occurrence in Japan, China, North Korea, South Korea, the Russian Far East, and Nepal. The lichen grows in humid forests, particularly those near coastal areas, and has been observed growing on a variety of trees, including coniferous and deciduous species. In Nepal, Parmelia squarrosa has been reported from 3,000 to 3,800 m elevation in a compilation of published records.

== Similar species ==
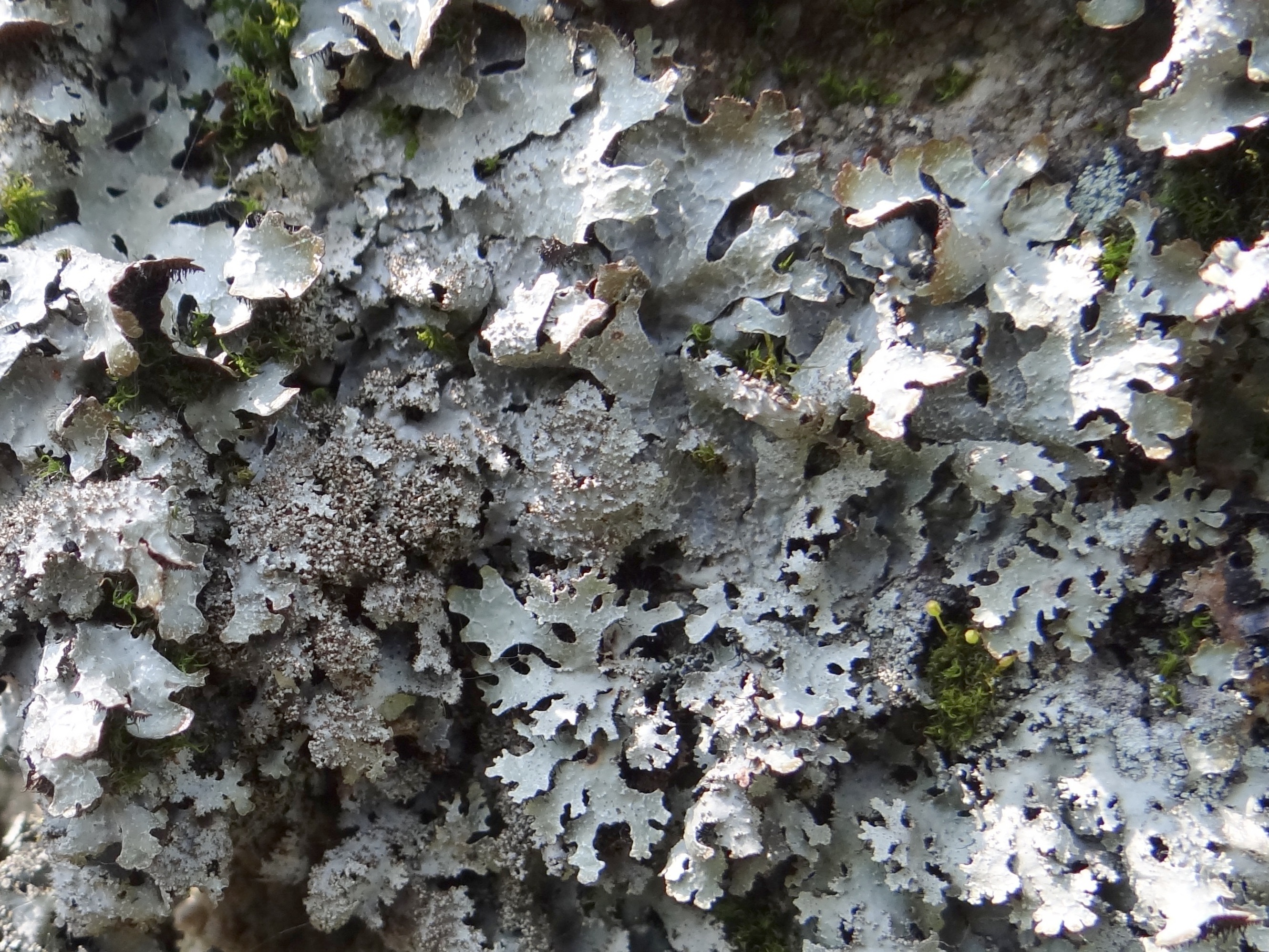
Parmelia saxatilis

The distinction between the Parmelia squarrosa and P. saxatilis is typically drawn based on an examination of their respective rhizines. P. squarrosa is known for its squarrosely branched rhizines, a feature that sets it apart from P. saxatilis. Nonetheless, to identify specimens that are either small in size or not fully developed, it may be necessary to scrape the lower surface using a scalpel or razor blade. This will allow the removal of the rhizines, which can subsequently be scrutinised on a white paper surface for better clarity. Squarrose rhizines, characterised by secondary branches that sprout at right angles to the main stem, might only be discernible near the axils of the terminal lobes in squarrose species. In contrast, furcate rhizines found in parmelioid lichens have secondary branches that spring out at an angle from the main stem.

== Conservation & research ==
In 2021, Parmelia squarrosa was assessed for the global IUCN Red List. Because the lichen is common, abundant, and widely distributed with a stable population size, it is considered a least-concern species.

In one transplantation study (i.e. moving lichens to different areas and following their subsequent growth), transplanting lichen-bearing bark discs of Parmelia squarrosa from an unpolluted area into a polluted area near a copper smelter in Quebec resulted in changes in colour, detachment from the substrate, cracks, a reduction in isidia, biomass values, and chlorophyll over 4 and 12 months of exposure. The closer the transplantation was to the smelter, the more severe the changes became.
