= Parmelia fertilis =

Scientific classification
- Kingdom: Fungi
- Division: Ascomycota
- Class: Lecanoromycetes
- Order: Lecanorales
- Family: Parmeliaceae
- Genus: Parmelia
- Species: P. fertilis

Binomial name
- Parmelia fertilis Müll.Arg. (1887)

Synonyms
- Parmelia cochleata Zahlbr. (1927); Parmelia marmariza var. physcioides Zahlbr. (1927); Parmelia pseudosaxatilis Asahina (1951); Parmelia subdivaricata Asahina (1951)

Species of lichen

Parmelia fertilis is a species of corticolous (bark-dwelling) foliose lichen in the family Parmeliaceae. Originally described from Siberian collections in 1887, this lichen has a broad temperate distribution across the Northern Hemisphere, occurring in Asia from the Himalayas to Japan and Taiwan, in Siberia, and in maritime regions of eastern Canada. In North America it was recognised only late in the 20th century and has since been confirmed from Maine, where it was first reported for the United States. The species forms pale greenish to whitish-grey rosette-shaped growths 6–12 cm across on tree bark, characterized by lobes with conspicuous pale pores that sometimes merge into a white network near the tips. It is closely related to Parmelia sulcata but can be distinguished by its smaller asexual spores and denser root-like structures on the undersurface, and it readily produces fruiting bodies.

== Taxonomy ==
Parmelia fertilis was described by the Swiss lichenologist Johannes Müller Argoviensis in 1887, from bark-dwelling material collected in Siberia and sent by Johann Lahm. In the protologue Müller said the species resembles P. rudecta and P. borreri in general aspect, and shares with P. saxatilis a fine, faintly sorediate surface sculpture; he regarded it as distinct, however, for its broadly coalescent central lobes and its profuse, readily formed fruiting bodies (apothecia). He did not see mature spores and inferred from the asci that they were of average size, as in P. borreri.

A later taxon described by Yasuhiko Asahina in 1951, Parmelia subdivaricata, based on specimens from Taiwan, was later shown to represent the same species and was treated as a synonym in Mason Hale's 1987 monograph on the genus. Müller's name has priority, as his description pre-dated Asahina's by several decades. The species is closely related to Parmelia sulcata, from which it differs mainly in its smaller microconidia and denser rhizines, and was historically confused with that taxon in parts of its range.

== Description ==
The thallus of Parmelia fertilis grows closely attached to bark and forms pale greenish to whitish-grey rosettes 6–12 cm across. The lobes are fairly long and overlapping, 1.5–5 mm wide, and more adnate and compact in Canadian specimens than in Asian ones. The upper surface is smooth to slightly wrinkled, becoming cracked with age, and bears conspicuous pale pores (pseudocyphellae) that are 0.5–1 mm long, elongate, and mostly marginal and laminal; they sometimes fuse to form a discontinuous white network near the lobe tips. The undersurface is black and densely covered with root-like rhizines that are simple to densely branched and 0.5–2 mm long.

Asexual reproduction is common: pycnidia are frequent and produce cylindrical to weakly spindle-shaped conidia 5.5–6.5 micrometres (μm) long. Apothecia are also common, usually somewhat sessile, and 2–7 mm in diameter; the discs are dark brown with a finely reticulate-pseudocyphellate thalline margin. The hymenium is 55–60 μm tall, and the ascospores are 6–8 × 12–14 μm, with a thin outer wall about 1 μm thick.

Chemically, the species produces atranorin and salazinic acid, with consalazinic acid also recorded in some material.

Specimens from eastern North America (New Brunswick and Nova Scotia) are morphologically identical to Asian material, though typically more compact, with similarly dense rhizines and comparable spore dimensions. Parmelia fertilis lacks soredia and isidia, features present in several superficially similar Parmelia, and it differs from the rarely corticolous P. omphalodes in having squarrose (rather than simple) rhizines.

== Habitat and distribution ==
Parmelia fertilis occurs across a broad temperate range in the Northern Hemisphere, with records from Asia, North America, and eastern Russia. It is widespread in Japan, Taiwan, and Korea, and extends northwards into Siberia and westwards to the Himalayas. In North America, the species has been confirmed from New Brunswick and Nova Scotia, where it is rare and restricted to oceanic habitats. The lichen typically grows on the bark of trees in humid, cool-temperate forests, often in well-ventilated or coastal areas that experience regular moisture. The species was acknowledged as part of the North American lichen flora only recently; subsequent fieldwork documented the first United States record from Maine.

Material from Asia, particularly from Japan and Taiwan, tends to form larger and more open rosettes than that from eastern Canada, which is more compact and tightly adnate. Despite these regional differences, populations share the same key features.
