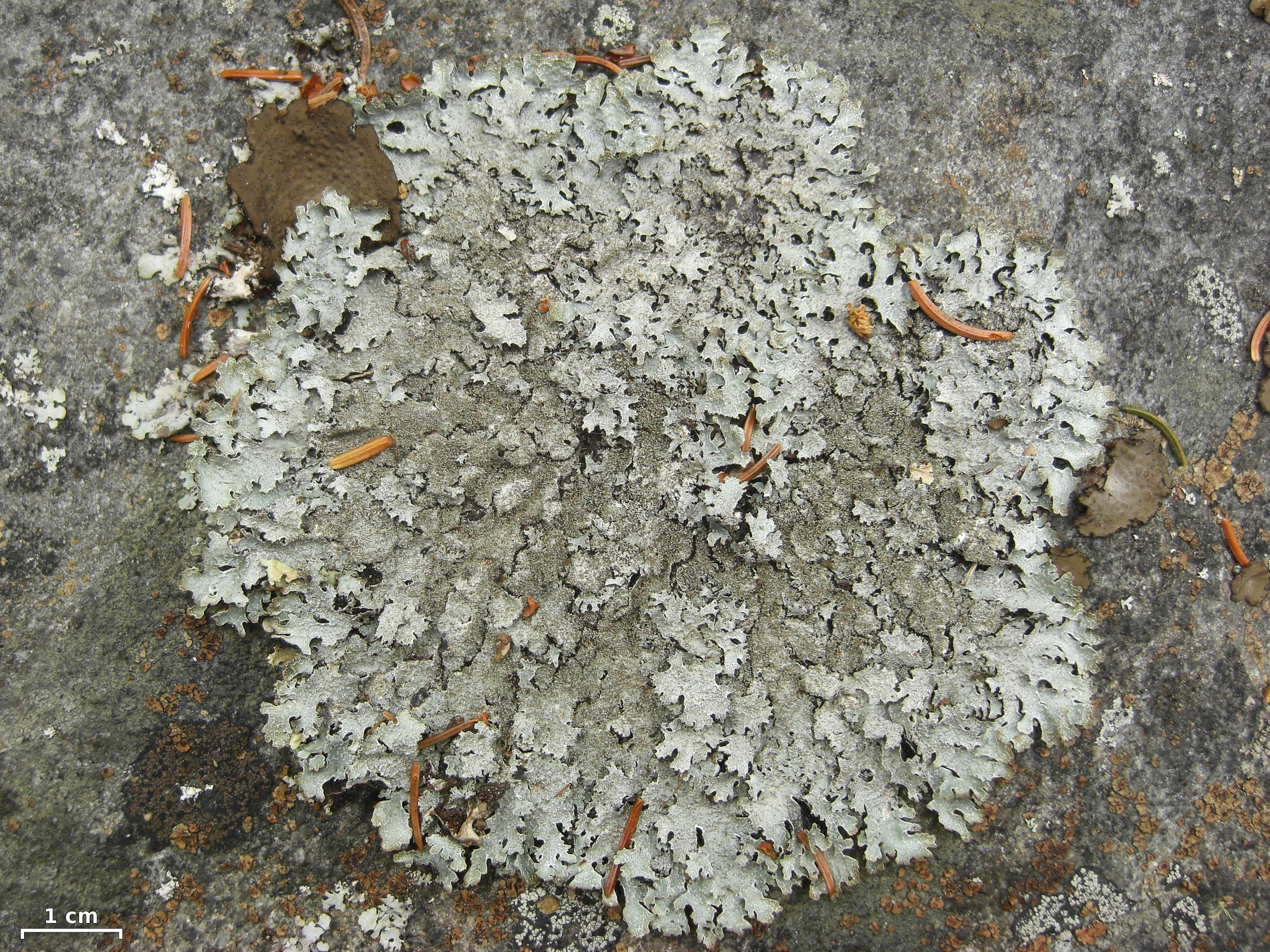
- Parmelia saxatilis

Scientific classification
- Kingdom: Fungi
- Division: Ascomycota
- Class: Lecanoromycetes
- Order: Lecanorales
- Family: Parmeliaceae
- Genus: Parmelia; Ach. (1803)

Type species
- Parmelia saxatilis (L.) Ach. (1803)

Synonyms
- Lichen L. (1753); Amphischizonia Mont. (1856); Cryptodictyon A.Massal. (1860); Aspidelia Stirt. (1900)

= Parmelia (fungus) =

Genus of lichen-forming fungi

Parmelia is a genus of medium to large foliose (leafy) lichens. It has a global distribution, extending from the Arctic to the Antarctic continent but concentrated in temperate regions. There are about 40 species in Parmelia. In recent decades, the once large genus Parmelia has been divided into a number of smaller genera according to thallus morphology and phylogenetic relatedness.

It is a foliaceous lichen, resembling a leaf in shape. The ends of the leaf-like lobes are often squarish-tipped. The upper surface is pale bluish-gray to light brown in direct sunlight, with a network of web-like ridges and depressions. The lower surface is black and has rhizines anchoring it to the substrate. In general, Parmelia have a dark lower side with rhizines ('rootlets') that attach the lichen to its substrate. The upper side may be grey or brown and may have reproductive organs on it. These may be apothecia (ascospore-producing bodies), isidia or soralia (both vegetative structures). In between these two layers are the algal layer, just below the upper cortex, and the medulla beneath it.

== Taxonomy ==
Parmelia was circumscribed by Swedish lichenologist Erik Acharius in 1803. His idea of the genus, which included foliose species with lecanorine apothecia, was quite broad and included species that are now dispersed in many different genera and families, such as the Peltigeraceae (Lobaria), the Pannariaceae (Pannaria, Parmeliella), the Physciaceae (Physcia, Heterodermia, Physconia), the Teloschistaceae (Xanthoria), as well as the Parmeliaceae (Cetraria, Hypogymnia, and Parmeliopsis). Its broad circumscription meant that almost every lichen with a thalline apothecial rim was included by early 19th-century authors.

In an attempt to create more homogeneous groups of taxa, lichenologists created new segregate genera for species once in Parmelia. These included Menegazzia (1854), Parmotrema (1860), Anzia (1861), Parmeliopsis (1869), Hypogymnia (1896), Pseudevernia (1903), Pannoparmelia (1912), and Pseudoparmelia (1914). In the 1970s and 1980s, electron microscopy was used to help divide several Parmelia species groups into different genera based on the structure of their cortex. These include Arctoparmelia, Bulbothrix, Canoparmelia, Cetrariastrum, Concamerella, Everniastrum, Flavoparmelia, Hypotrachyna, Neofuscelia, Paraparmelia, Parmelina, Parmotrema, Pseudoparmelia, Relicina, Relicinopsis, Xanthomaculina, and Xanthoparmelia. Another group of species was segregated on the basis of the presence of pseudocyphellae: Punctelia, Flavopunctelia, and Melanelia. In Mason Hale's 1987 monograph on Parmelia, he commented: "This group has been further subdivided ... now leaving in Parmelia a small, apparently irreducible assemblage of 38 species typified by P. saxatilis". In 2014, however, sixteen mostly Australasian species were moved to the new genus Notoparmelia; these species had been shown by molecular phylogenetic analysis to form a monophyletic lineage in Parmelia. Targeted sampling in western North America also uncovered two species within the P. saxatilis complex: P. imbricaria (a rock-dwelling taxon with copiously overlapping inner lobules and predominantly marginal pseudocyphellae) and P. sulymae (a humid-forest species with narrow lobes and marginal, soredia-like propagules). Both were described from British Columbia and adjacent regions on the basis of combined morphology and multilocus phylogeny.

Traditional morphological and chemical characteristics have proven insufficient for reliable species identification within Parmelia. For example, while pruina (a dusty looking surface appearance) was previously considered a diagnostic feature in isidiate Parmelia species, studies have shown that individual specimens can vary in their degree of pruinosity. Similarly, in Parmelia species without vegetative propagules, the presence of lobaric acid was once considered diagnostic. However, this secondary metabolite has been found to be inconsistently present within specimens of the same species. The incorporation of molecular methods in Parmelia taxonomy has led to the discovery of cryptic taxa, such as P. encryptata and near-cryptic species like P. rojoi.

== Evolution and diversification ==
Most diversification within Parmelia appears to have taken place during the Neogene, with subsequent radiations in the Pleistocene. A time-calibrated multilocus phylogeny dated the crown group of Parmelia (in the strict sense) to the early Miocene (about 19.5 Ma), with the main lineages corresponding to the P. saxatilis and P. sulcata groups diverging roughly 10 Ma. Several species lineages then split or diversified during later episodes of global cooling and habitat reorganisation, including Pliocene splits (e.g., P. sulymae–P. serrana) and Pleistocene radiations within complexes such as P. saxatilis and P. encryptata. These timing patterns are consistent with climate-driven range shifts and fragmentation through the Miocene–Pleistocene.

== Fossil record ==
There are two foliose fossil taxa, Parmelia ambra and P. isidiiveteris, that have been placed provisionally in genus Parmelia due to their overall resemblance to members of this genus. Later authors have suggested, however, that this generic placement is not appropriate for the current concept of Parmelia, and that because of insufficient information, it is impossible to know for certain which of the many foliose genera in the family Parmeliaceae is best suited for these fossils.

== Description ==
Parmelia species have a foliose (leafy) thallus with a substrate attachment ranging from loose to tight. The lobes comprising the thallus are rounded, more or less straight, and may be contiguous or overlapping (imbricate). The texture of the upper thallus ranges from smooth to foveolate (covered with pits and depressions). The colour is typically green to whitish grey to greyish brown, and some species have a coating of pruina on the surface. Most species have pseudocyphellae (tiny pores that allow for gas exchange), and vegetative propagules such as isidia or soredia, or both. The lower surface of the thallus is black (or close to it), and has rhizines (either simple or branched) that function as holdfasts to attach it to its substrate. The cortex (botany) is paraplectenchymatous – a cell arrangement where the hyphae are oriented in all directions.

The ascomata of Parmelia species are in the form of apothecia, which have a zeorine structure (an apothecium in which a proper exciple is enclosed in the thalline exciple) and are laminal (superficial on the surface) to somewhat stipitate. The exposed upper surface of the hymenium, the disc, is brown, rarely blackish. The asci are eight-spored, while the spores are colorless, ellipsoid, and measure 10–18 by 5–13 μm. The conidiomata are in the form of pycnidia; these black spots are laminal and immersed in the thallus surface. They produce cylindrical to slightly bifusiform conidia with dimensions of 5.5–8 μm. The photobiont partners of Parmelia are green algae from the genus Trebouxia.

== Photobionts ==
Recent research has revealed insights into the ecological relationships between Parmelia lichens and their algal partners (photobionts). While earlier studies suggested that Parmelia species were highly selective in their choice of photobionts, a 2024 study revealed a more nuanced picture. By examining the genetic diversity of both fungi and algae at the species and haplotype (genetic variant) levels, the researchers found that some widespread Parmelia species, such as P. saxatilis and P. sulcata, exhibit more flexibility in their photobiont associations than previously thought. This adaptability may help explain these species' broad geographic distributions. The study also found that the mode of reproduction (whether through soredia or isidia, two types of vegetative propagules) did not significantly affect the specificity of fungal-algal partnerships.

== Ecology ==
Parmelia lichens are food for the caterpillars of certain Lepidoptera, such as the bagworm moth Taleporia tubulosa.

The mycobiome (the complete community of fungi living within the lichen thallus) reveals that Parmelia lichens are more complex than the traditional view of a simple fungal-algal partnership. Research comparing lichen mycobiomes between Turkey and South Korea has revealed that Parmelia and Peltigera lichens host complex fungal communities dominated by Ascomycota (40%) and Basidiomycota (24%), with Capnodiales being particularly prevalent. While both host species identity and geographic location influence these fungal communities, geographic factors have a stronger effect on mycobiome composition than the lichen host genus. The Parmelia mycobiome includes core fungal members like Cutaneotrichosporon debeurmannianum and various Chaetothyriales and Dothideomycetes species, which persist across different locations. These fungal communities appear to be highly adaptable, allowing Parmelia to maintain consistent mycobiome features across diverse environmental conditions. Population-level sampling indicates ongoing gene flow between Europe and North America in widespread species such as P. saxatilis, P. sulcata and P. barrenoae, implying that their intercontinental distributions are maintained by long-distance dispersal.

== Conservation ==
Two species of Parmelia have been assessed by the International Union for Conservation of Nature for the global IUCN Red List. Both Parmelia saxatilis and P. squarrosa are considered species of least concern due to their widespread distribution, abundance, and stable populations.

== Distribution ==
Eleven Parmelia species were recorded for Europe in 2008. Nine occur in the Nordic lichen flora, of which P. saxatilis and P. sulcata are most common and widespread.

== Dyeing ==
Several Parmelia species were used in traditional dyeing in northern Europe. In the Scottish Highlands, they were boiled with wool to produce yellowish, brownish, and reddish-brown shades for woollen textiles used in tweed and tartan, and comparable lichen-dyeing traditions were also reported from Scandinavia. Among the best-documented examples is Parmelia saxatilis, the lichen known as crottle, a source of reddish-brown cloth dye. Modern chemical analysis of crottle identifies atranorin as one of its main colourants, and P. saxatilis has been reported to yield golden to reddish-brown colours on wool.

== Species ==
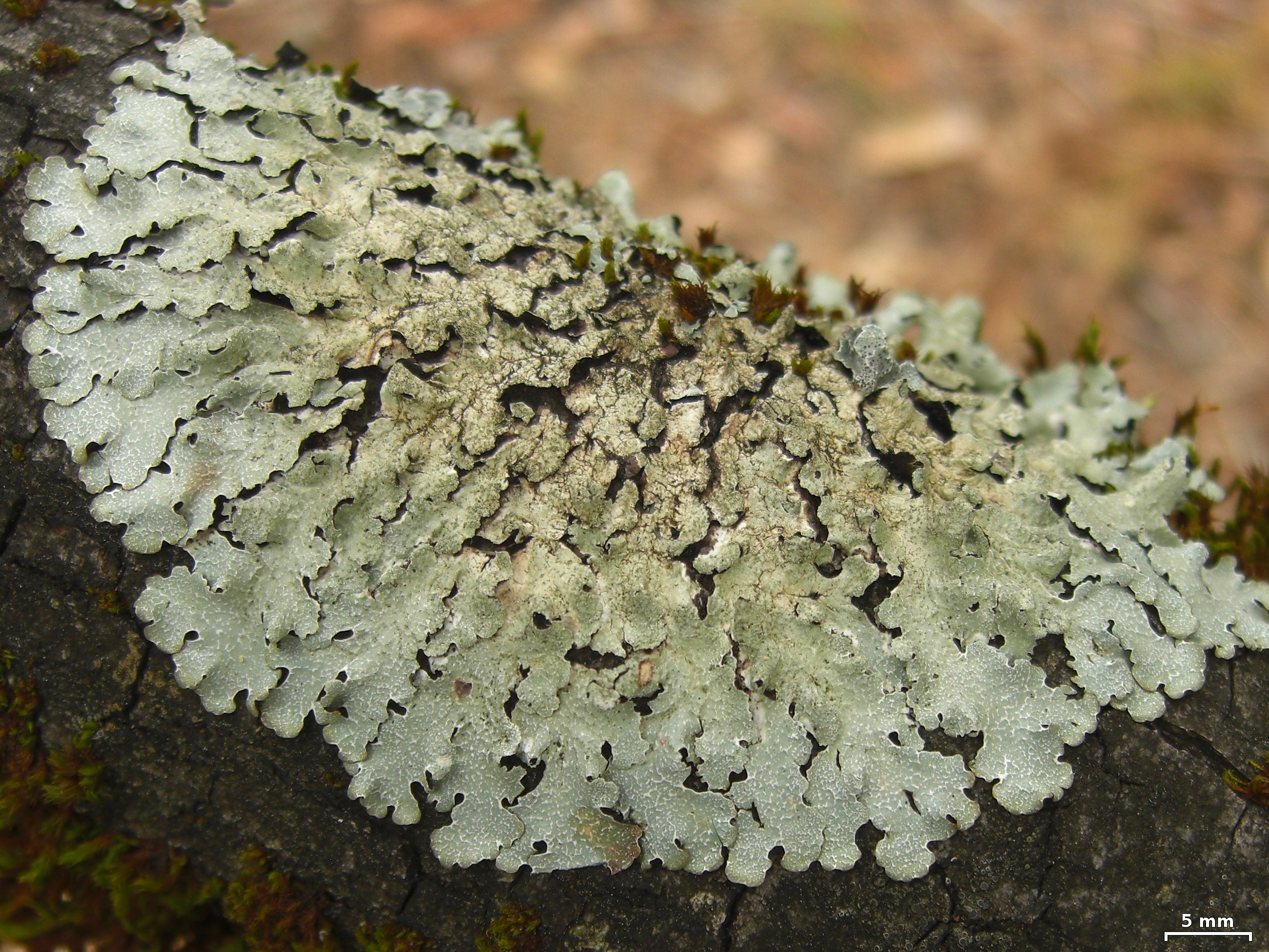
Parmelia hygrophila

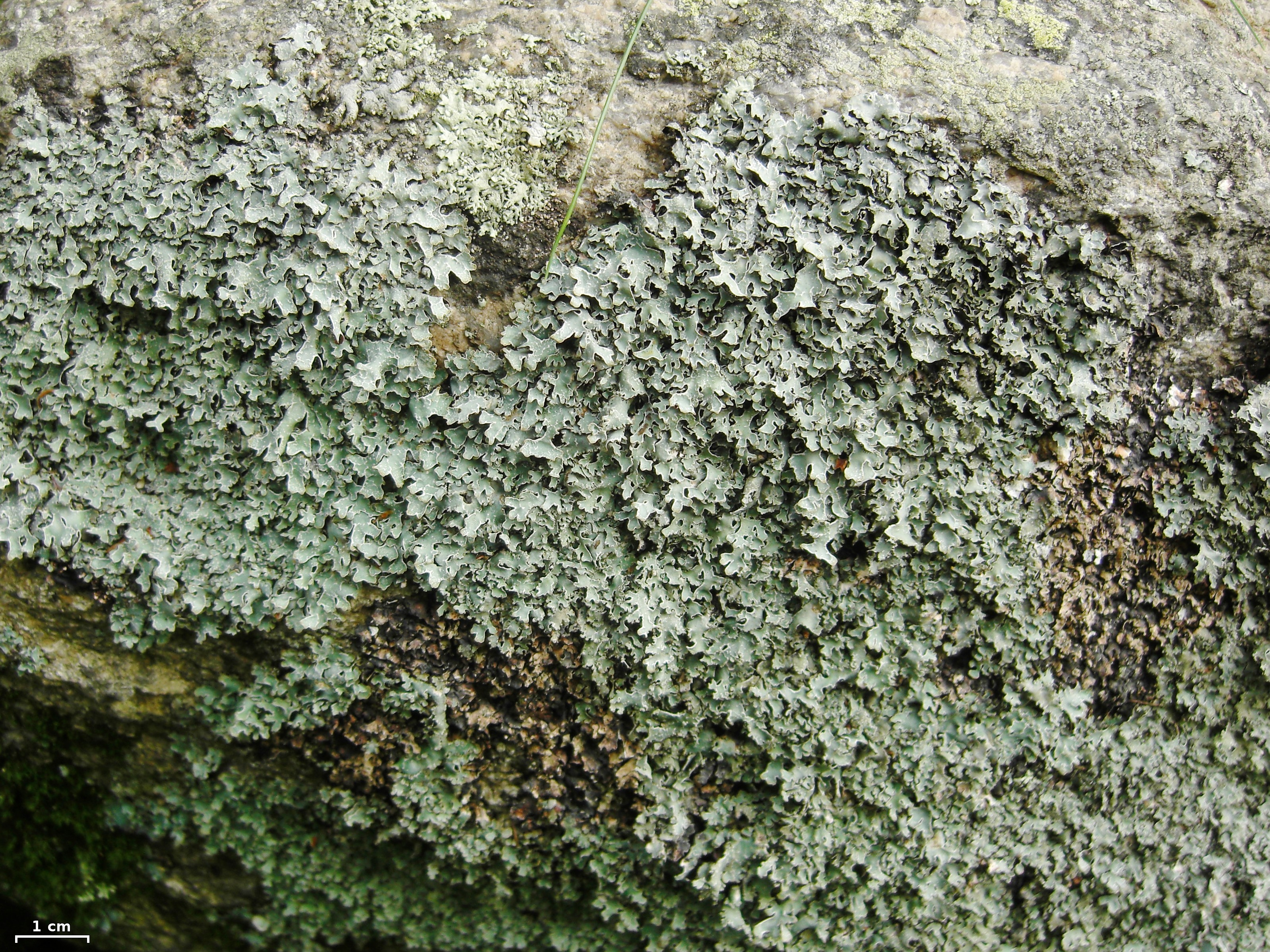
Parmelia omphalodes

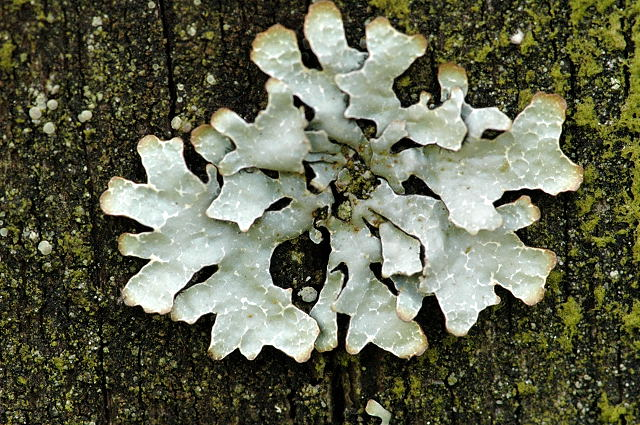
Parmelia sulcata

As of November 2025, Species Fungorum (in the Catalogue of Life) recognises 139 species of Parmelia, although many of these are historical names with little modern literature presence.

- Parmelia adaugescens Nyl. (1890)
- † Parmelia ambra Poinar, E.B.Peterson & Platt (2000) – extinct; fossilized in Dominican amber
- Parmelia asiatica A.Crespo & Divakar (2011) – China
- Parmelia barrenoae Divakar, M.C.Molina & A.Crespo (2005) – Europe
- Parmelia discordans Nyl. (1886) – Europe
- Parmelia encryptata A.Crespo, Divakar & M.C.Molina (2011)
- Parmelia ernstiae Feuerer & A.Thell (2002) – Europe
- Parmelia fertilis Müll.Arg. (1887)
- Parmelia fraudans (Nyl.) Nyl. (1861)
- Parmelia hygrophila Goward & Ahti (1983) – North America
- Parmelia hygrophiloides Divakar, Upreti & Elix (2003) – India
- Parmelia imbricaria Goward, Divakar, M.C.Molina & A.Crespo (2017)
- † Parmelia isidiiveteris Poinar, E.B.Peterson & Platt (2000) – extinct; fossilized in Dominican amber
- Parmelia lambii Øvstedal (2009) – Antarctica
- Parmelia marmariza Nyl. (1890)
- Parmelia mayi Divakar, A.Crespo & M.C.Molina (2011) – northeastern North America
- Parmelia meiophora Nyl. (1889)
- Parmelia neodiscordans Hale (1987)
- Parmelia niitakana Asahina (1951)
- Parmelia omphalodes (L.) Ach. (1803) – Europe
- Parmelia pinnatifida Kurok. (1976) – Europe
- Parmelia protosignifera Elix & J.Johnst. (1988) – Australia
- Parmelia pseudoshinanoana Asahina (1951)
- Parmelia rojoi A.Crespo, V.J.Rico & Divakar (2020) – Europe
- Parmelia saxatilis (L.) Ach. (1803) – Europe
- Parmelia serrana A.Crespo, M.C.Molina & D.Hawksw. (2004) – Europe
- Parmelia shinanoana Zahlbr. (1927)
- Parmelia skultii Hale (1987) – Europe
- Parmelia squarrosa Hale (1971) – North America, East Asia
- Parmelia submontana Hale (1987) – Europe
- Parmelia submutata Hue (1899)
- Parmelia sulcata Taylor (1836) – Europe
- Parmelia sulymae Goward, Divakar, M.C.Molina & A.Crespo (2017)
