= Xanthoparmelia boyeri =

Scientific classification
- Domain: Eukaryota
- Kingdom: Fungi
- Division: Ascomycota
- Class: Lecanoromycetes
- Order: Lecanorales
- Family: Parmeliaceae
- Genus: Xanthoparmelia
- Species: X. boyeri

Binomial name
- Xanthoparmelia boyeri Elix (2002)

Species of lichen

Xanthoparmelia boyeri is a species of foliose lichen in the family Parmeliaceae. Found in Kenya, it was formally described as a new species in 2002 by Australian lichenologist John Elix. The type specimen was collected from the Lewis Glacier on Mount Kenya, where it was found growing on volcanic rock. The species epithet refers to M. Boyer, one of the collectors of the type. The lichen contains salazinic acid as a major lichen product, minor amounts of usnic acid and norstictic acid, and trace amounts of consalazinic acid.

== See also ==
- List of Xanthoparmelia species
