= Parmelia hygrophiloides =

Scientific classification
- Domain: Eukaryota
- Kingdom: Fungi
- Division: Ascomycota
- Class: Lecanoromycetes
- Order: Lecanorales
- Family: Parmeliaceae
- Genus: Parmelia
- Species: P. hygrophiloides

Binomial name
- Parmelia hygrophiloides Divakar, Upreti & Elix (2003)

Species of lichen

Parmelia hygrophiloides is a species of corticolous (bark-dwelling) foliose lichen in the family Parmeliaceae. It occurs in the Western Himalayas of India, in the state of Himachal Pradesh.

== Taxonomy ==
It was described as a new species in 2003 by lichenologists Pradeep Divakar, Dalip Kumar Upreti, and John Elix. The type specimen was collected in the Parbati River Valley in Himachal Pradesh, at an elevation of 2,400 m (7,900 ft); there it was found growing on the trunk of a pine tree.

== Description ==
Parmelia hygrophiloides is similar in appearance to the North American species Parmelia hygrophila. The Indian species differs from its counterpart in having dense rhizines with dense squarrose subbranches, and smaller ascospores (10–15 by 6–8 μm compared to 14–16 by 9–12 μm). Parmelia hygrophiloides has been recorded from several areas in Himachal Pradesh, and also grows on coniferous tree trunks. The expected results of standard chemical spot tests are: cortex K+ (yellow); medulla K+ (yellow then dark red), C−, KC−, and P+ (orange). The lichen contains several secondary compounds, including atranorin, chloroatranorin, and salazinic acid.

== Habitat and distribution ==
The species occurs in several locales in Himachal Pradesh, where it grows on coniferous trees.
