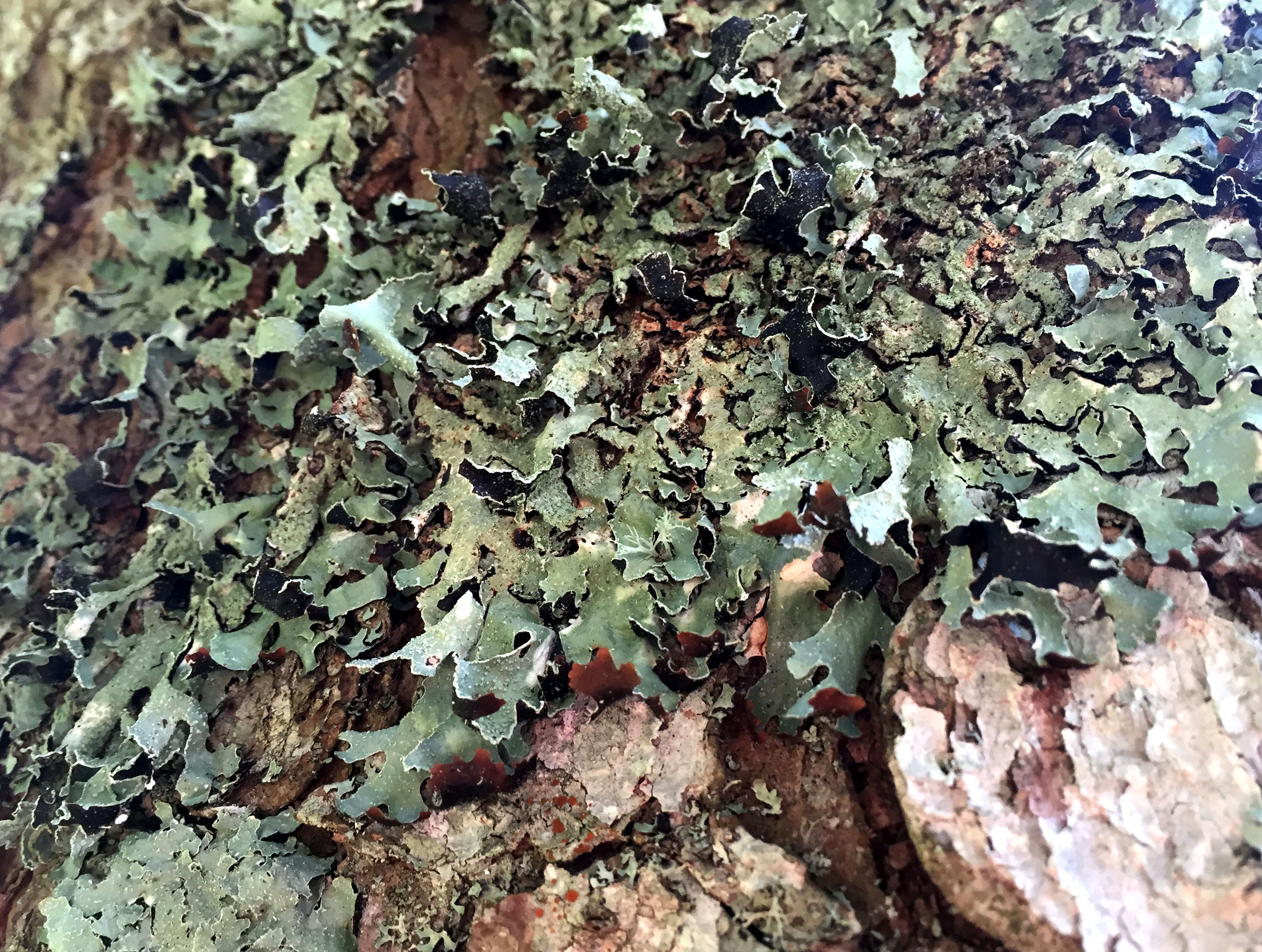
- On tree bark in the Italian Alps

Scientific classification
- Domain: Eukaryota
- Kingdom: Fungi
- Division: Ascomycota
- Class: Lecanoromycetes
- Order: Lecanorales
- Family: Parmeliaceae
- Genus: Parmelia
- Species: P. submontana

Binomial name
- Parmelia submontana Hale (1987)

Synonyms
- Parmelia contorta Bory (1832); Parmelia sulcata var. contorta Nyl. (1890); Parmelia saxatilis var. contorta (Nyl.) Zahlbr. (1907); Parmelia saxatilis f. contorta (Nyl.) Pit. & Harm. (1911); Parmelia sulcata var. contortoides Zahlbr. (1927); Parmotrema sulcatum var. contorta (Nyl.) M.Choisy (1952)

= Parmelia submontana =

Species of lichen

Parmelia submontana is a species of corticolous (bark-dwelling), foliose lichen in the family Parmeliaceae. First described in 1987, it is characterised by a loosely attached, greenish-grey body (thallus) reaching diameters of 10–15 cm (4–6 in), with elongated linear lobes and distinctive powdery structures (isidia-like soredia) for reproduction. The species has a complex taxonomic history, having been independently discovered twice – first in Greece in 1832 and later in eastern Bohemia in 1951 – and was long misidentified as related species before being recognised as distinct. It differs from related species in having simple to forked rhizines—root-like holdfasts that attach it to bark—rather than the bushy, bottlebrush-like squarrose rhizines found in similar species, and its blistered rounded soralia that develop from pseudocyphellae.

Though historically considered a Mediterranean and south-central European species, it has been expanding its range northward since the 1990s, particularly in Fennoscandia. The species shows considerable habitat flexibility, growing primarily on deciduous tree bark in areas with high precipitation and humid, sheltered environments, typically near lakes, wetlands, or along coasts. Molecular studies indicate it evolved as a distinct species during the mid-Pleistocene around 1.3 million years ago, and despite appearing morphologically intermediate between some species, it belongs firmly within the Parmelia saxatilis species group. Like many lichens, it produces several secondary metabolites including atranorin, salazinic acid, and consalazinic acid, despite its chemical profile being identical to that of P. saxatilis.

== Taxonomy ==
Early lichenologists struggled to classify Parmelia submontana, often treating it as a form or variety of related lichens instead of recognising it as distinct species. The lichen was treated by the American lichenologist Mason Hale in his 1987 monograph on the genus Parmelia. He described Parmelia submontana as a relatively rare European lichen species that had historically been poorly understood. In 1860, William Nylander, who likely examined the type specimen in Paris, regarded it as a narrow-lobed form of P. saxatilis var. sulcata and suggested that it also occurred in North America, although he did not cite any specific specimens. These North American reports were never subsequently confirmed with verified specimens. When the original Bory specimen was examined at the Muséum National d'Histoire Naturelle in Paris, it was found filed under P. saxatilis in the Thuret and Bory herbarium, likely due to Nylander's annotation marking it as "P. saxatilis var. angustifolia Nyl." For instance, Alexander Zahlbruckner placed it under both P. saxatilis and P. sulcata at different times, describing it as P. saxatilis (L.) Ach. var. contorta (Bory) Zahlbr. and P. sulcata Tayl. var. contortoides Zahlbr. The confusion persisted into the 20th century, with many specimens initially misidentified and only recognised later as P. submontana upon re-examination.

Collections made in Austria and Corsica reinforced the distinctiveness of P. submontana. Hale confirmed this based on the species' long, sparsely branched lobes, numerous orbicular soralia, small pseudocyphellae, and sparse, mostly simple (unbranched) rhizines, characteristics initially described by Josef Poelt in 1974. Schindler's 1975 summary provided an up-to-date account of the species' distribution and ecology in Europe, noting that P. submontana is primarily found in Mediterranean and South European montane regions.

Early molecular phylogenetics studies from 2004 examining the relationships within Parmelia s. str. found that P. submontana appeared morphologically intermediate between P. sulcata and P. saxatilis, but molecular evidence showed it was most closely related to P. saxatilis. Analysis of nuclear ITS ribosomal DNA and β-tubulin sequences placed P. submontana within a well-supported clade containing species with simple to furcate rhizines rather than with species having squarrose rhizines like P. sulcata. This rhizine morphology proved to be an important taxonomic character aligning with molecular phylogenetic groupings, helping to resolve some of the historical confusion around the species' relationships. The molecular evidence conclusively demonstrated that despite some morphological similarities, P. submontana belonged firmly within the P. saxatilis group rather than with superficially similar sorediate species like P. sulcata that possess squarrose rhizines.

The species has a peculiar nomenclatural history, having been discovered twice independently. It was first found and described by Bory de Saint-Vincent from Greece in 1832 as Parmelia contorta (type locality: Peloponnese, Taygetus Pass). It was later independently discovered in Eastern Bohemia by Josef Nádvorník, who initially described it under a different name as P. bohemica in 1951. This name was later determined to be illegitimate under Article 53.1 of the International Code of Botanical Nomenclature because P. bohemica Gyeln. (1932) was already in use for a different species (now known as Xanthoparmelia conspersa). To resolve this homonymy, Nádvorník proposed the replacement name P. submontana in 1957, but the name was not validly published under the botanical code. The name was finally validated by Mason Hale in 1987, making him the recognised authority for the species.

== Description ==
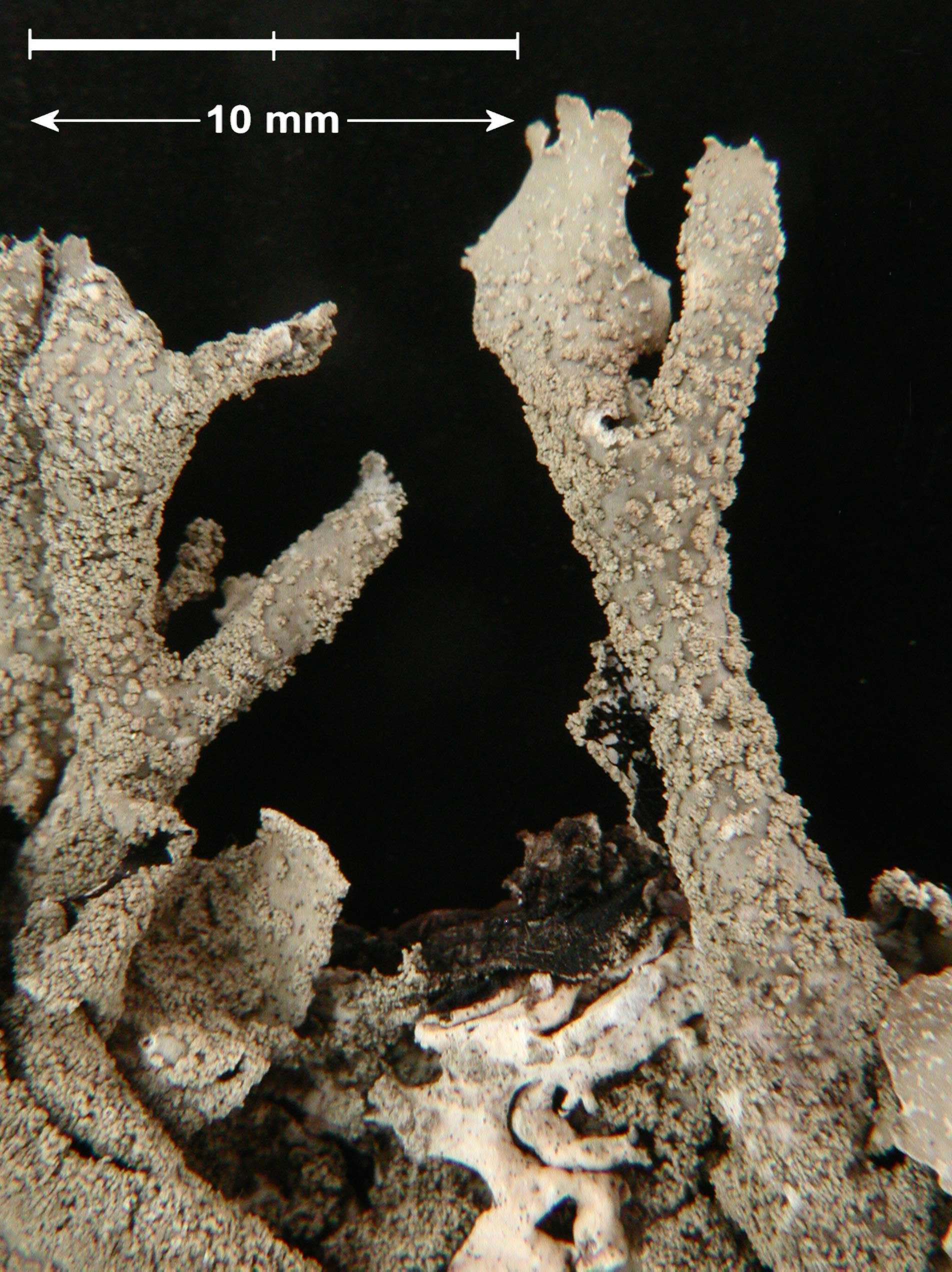
Close-up view of Parmelia submontana lobes showing the granular surface texture

Parmelia submontana is a lichen with a thallus that is loosely attached to the bark of trees, often trailing in well-developed specimens. It has a firm, greenish, mineral-grey thallus that can reach a width of 10–15 cm (4–6 in). The lobes are elongated and linear, measuring up to 30 mm in length and 2–5 mm in width. These lobes are only slightly branched and sometimes weakly channeled. The upper surface is shiny and unbroken, ranging from smooth to slightly wrinkled. It features small, round to irregularly shaped pseudocyphellae (tiny openings on the surface), which are located both on the lamina (the main, leafy part of the thallus) and along the margins. These pseudocyphellae, measuring 0.3–1 mm long, quickly develop soralia (powdery patches used for asexual reproduction) that are initially orbicular to linear, often becoming eroded with age. The soredia—tiny grain-like clusters that reproduce the lichen vegetatively—are granular, sometimes appearing almost like isidia (small outgrowths).

The lower surface of the thallus is black and sparsely covered with rhizines (root-like structures), which are simple to sparsely branched and measure 1–1.5 mm in length. The species has simple to furcate rhizines, where secondary branches arise obliquely from the axis, unlike the squarrose rhizines found in some other Parmelia species where secondary branches arise perpendicularly. Apothecia (sexual reproductive structures) are rare in this species. When present, they are round, 1–2 mm in diameter, disc-shaped with a slightly crenulate margin, and have a reddish-brown disc. The spores are colourless, single-celled, measuring 10–11 by 14–15 μm, with thick walls (2 μm). The hymenium (55–70 μm) and excipulum are colourless, with asci 25–55 μm in length.

The species occurs in two distinct morphological forms. The juvenile form, known as var. minor, is characterised by small, white, point-like (punctiform soralia on the lowest lobes, which do not grow in a rosette pattern and lack elongated band-like lobes. The mature form, var. perlonga, develops the characteristic elongated lobes and is typically greyer in colour, sometimes appearing dusky olive due to numerous ovoid isidia alongside the soralia.

Parmelia submontana contains several secondary metabolites (lichen products), including atranorin, salazinic acid, and consalazinic acid. Chromatographic analysis shows that the species shares an identical chemical profile with P. saxatilis, making the two species chemically indistinguishable. In addition to the major compounds, the species also contains norstictic acid and lobaric acid. When tested with potassium hydroxide solution (K), the thallus turns yellow (due to atranorin), while the medulla turns yellow then blood-red (due to salazinic acid). The soralia give an orange-red reaction with paraphenylenediamine (P).

== Similar species ==
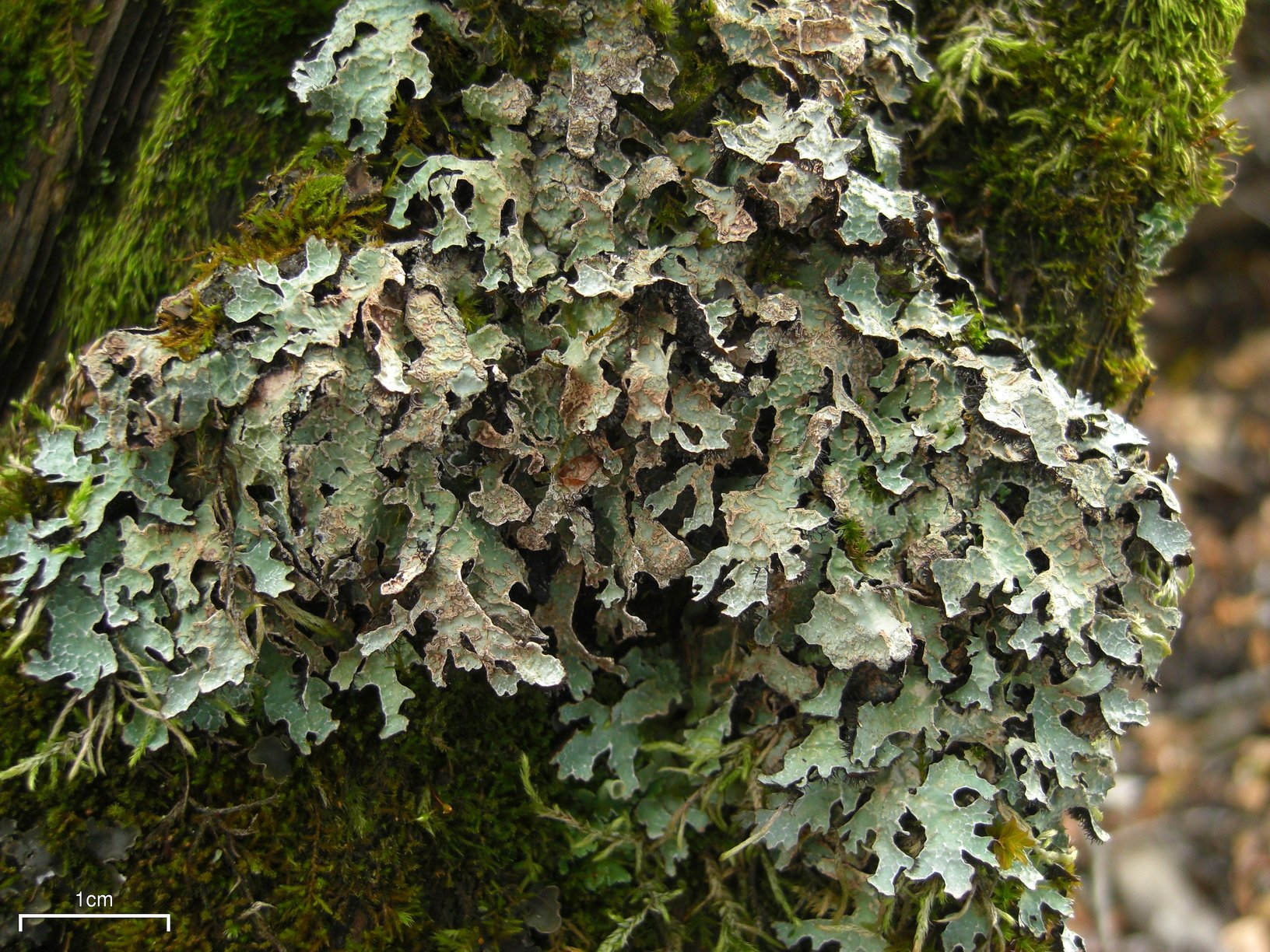
Parmelia barrenoae is a potential lookalike.

Parmelia submontana could potentially be confused with P. barrenoae as both species possess simple to furcate rhizines and produce soredia. However, they can be readily distinguished by several morphological features and belong to different evolutionary lineages. P. submontana is characterised by distinctive blistered, rounded soralia that may resemble finger-like or wart-like growths and long, separate, convolute lobes. In contrast, P. barrenoae has more superficial laminal soralia and develops curled-back older lobes that expose the underside of the thallus. Although superficially similar, revolute lobes differ from the convoluted or contorted lobes of P. submontana. Additionally, molecular evidence places P. submontana within the P. saxatilis group, while P. barrenoae belongs to the P. sulcata complex despite lacking the squarrose rhizines typical of that group.

When well-developed, it has characteristic long lobes with down-rolled margins and has powdery reproductive patches that can resemble those of Pseudevernia furfuracea.

== Evolution ==
Molecular studies suggest that the genus Parmelia originated during the Early Miocene epoch, approximately 19.5 million years ago. P. submontana itself diverged later, during the mid-Pleistocene, around 1.3 million years ago, arising from within a clade containing P. hygrophila. Morphologically, P. submontana shares visual traits with both P. sulcata and P. saxatilis, but molecular evidence shows it is most closely related to P. saxatilis.

== Habitat and distribution ==
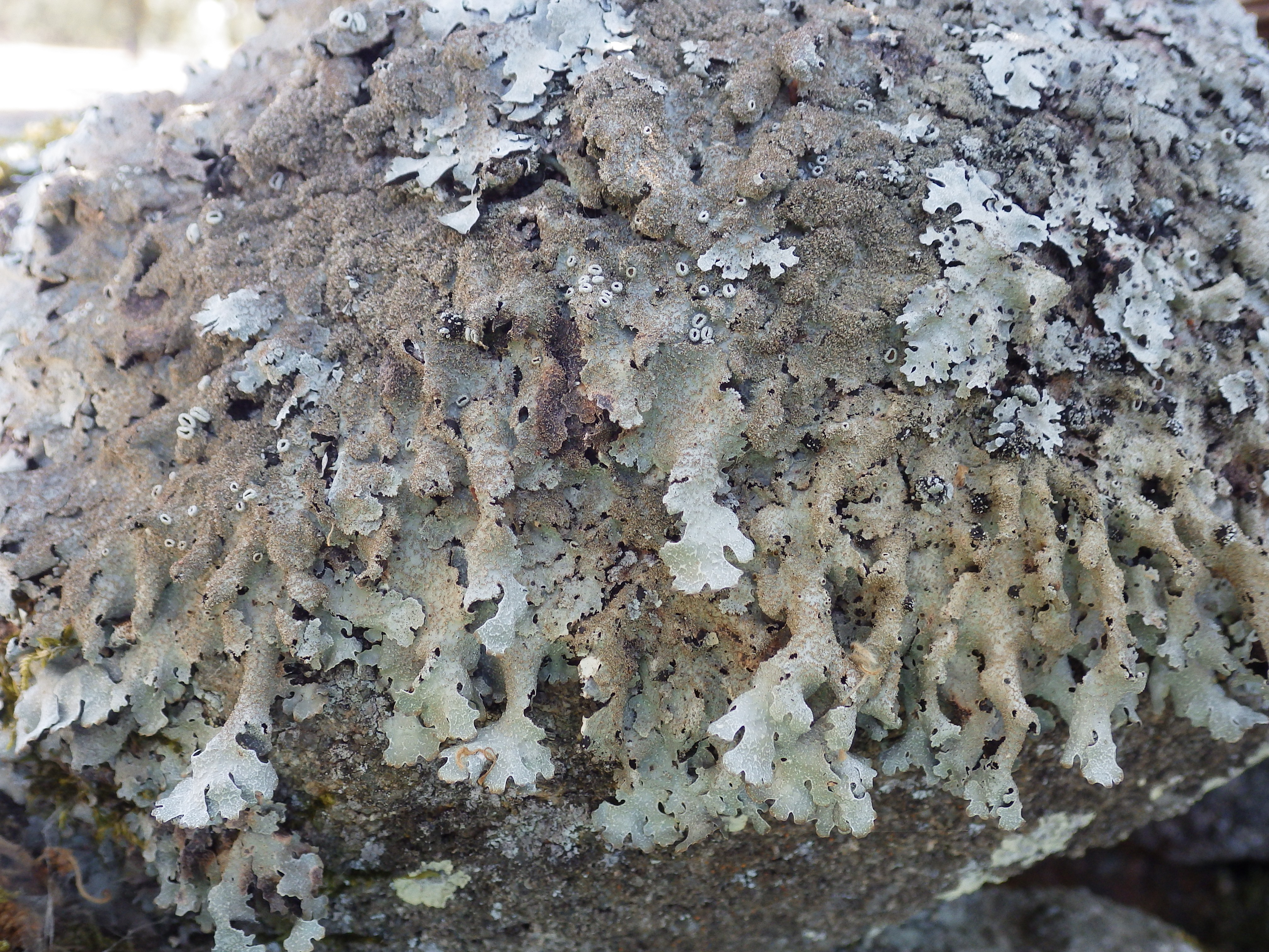
Parmelia submontana on tree bark in Serra de São Mamede, Portugal, showing its characteristic long, trailing lobes and pale greenish-grey colouration

Parmelia submontana is widely distributed across Europe, occurring in at least 30 countries and territories. The species has been recorded throughout much of Central Europe, including Austria, Belgium, Switzerland, Czech Republic, Germany, and Luxembourg. In Western Europe, it is present in France, the Netherlands, and the United Kingdom. In Scotland, where it was first recorded in 2002, it often grows on introduced (non-native) tree species and may be an accidental garden import. The lichen's range extends into Northern Europe, with populations documented in Denmark, Norway, and Sweden. In Eastern Europe, it has been recorded in Estonia, Latvia, Lithuania, Poland, Russia, Slovakia, and Ukraine. The species is also present across Southern Europe, occurring in Italy, Slovenia, Greece, and Spain. Additional populations are known from several Balkan countries, including Bulgaria, while the species' range extends into Turkey at its southeastern limit. Although previously reported from Belarus, recent comprehensive studies have failed to confirm its presence there.

Although traditionally considered a Mediterranean and south-central European species, P. submontana has been documented expanding its range northward in recent decades, particularly in Fennoscandia. In Sweden, it has been documented in the provinces of Skåne, Halland and Västergötland, while in Denmark it occurs in northern and eastern Jutland. The species has also spread to Norway, being recorded in Aust-Agder and Vest-Agder. In northern regions, it shows a preference for areas with high precipitation (typically 500–750 mm annually) and humid microclimates, often occurring near water bodies such as lakes, boggy areas, or coastal regions. The species displays considerable habitat flexibility: it grows in forests, gardens, parklands, forest edges, and along roadsides, though populations in open habitats tend to occur near water bodies. It grows on the trunks and branches of various deciduous trees including Acer platanoides, Carpinus betulus, Fagus sylvatica, Malus domestica, Quercus robur, and Tilia cordata, as well as occasionally on conifers such as Picea abies. In the Mediterranean region, it is found more frequently on conifers, including species such as Abies cephalonica, A. pinsapo, and Pinus pallesiana. In regions like the Black Forest, the species reaches its optimal development at altitudes around 800 metres.

The species typically occurs in association with other lichens such as Parmelia saxatilis, P. sulcata, and Pertusaria amara. In Mediterranean regions, it can be found in communities with Lobaria pulmonaria, L. amplissima, Nephroma lusitanicum, and other species that require high air humidity. This frequent co-occurrence with moisture-loving species reinforces its preference for damp environments.

While some lichen species have shown decline due to air pollution and the loss of suitable trees (particularly long-established avenue trees), P. submontana has demonstrated considerable expansion in certain regions. For example, in the Northern Black Forest, documented locations increased from just 5 sites in 1968 to over 70 by 1996, suggesting the species may be benefiting from changing environmental conditions or improved air quality.
