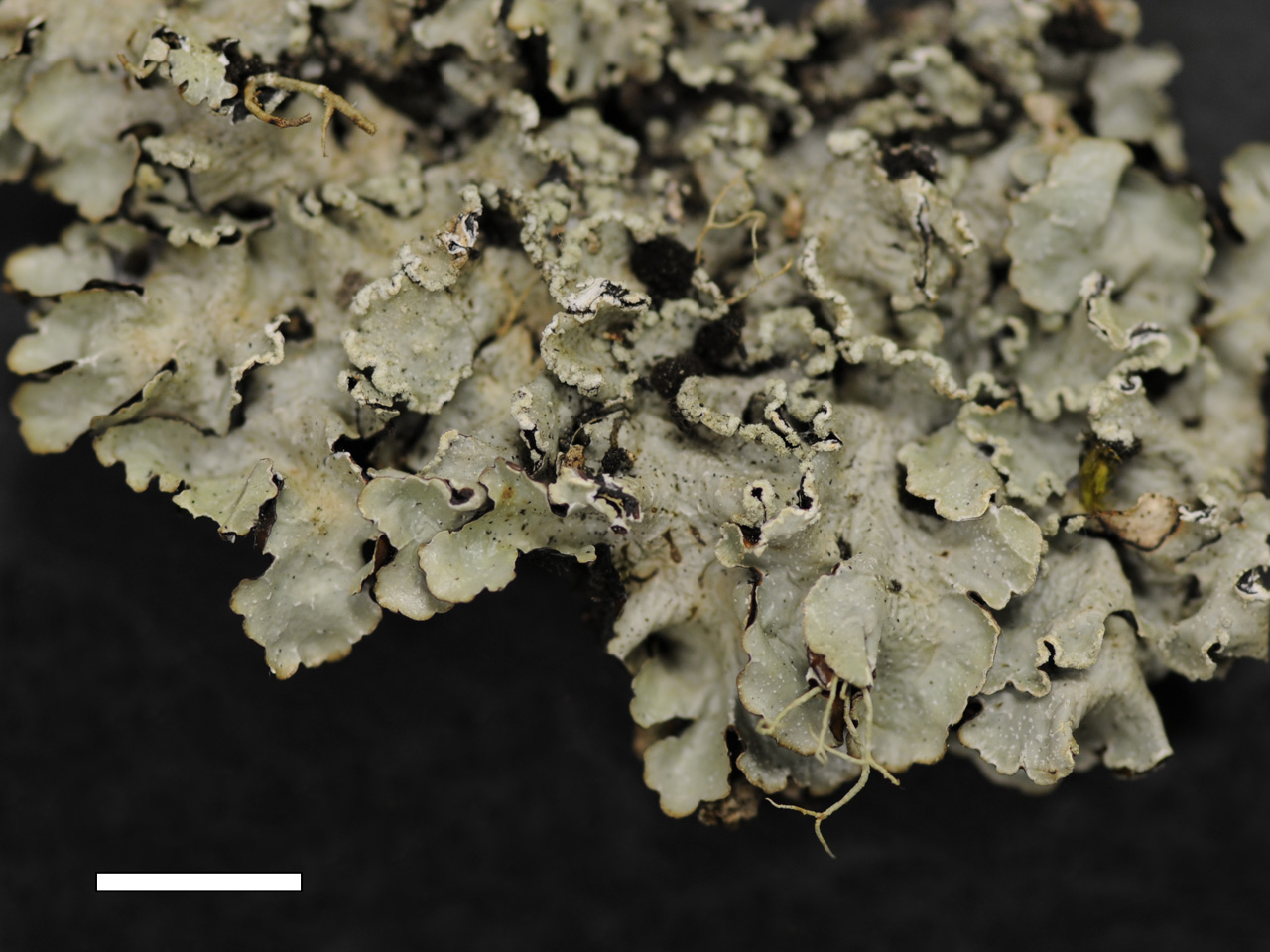
- Notoparmelia cunninghamii, collected in New Zealand

Scientific classification
- Kingdom: Fungi
- Division: Ascomycota
- Class: Lecanoromycetes
- Order: Lecanorales
- Family: Parmeliaceae
- Genus: Notoparmelia; A.Crespo, Ferencová & Divakar (2014)

Type species
- Notoparmelia signifera (Nyl.) A.Crespo, Ferencová & Divakar (2014)

= Notoparmelia =

Genus of lichen-forming fungi

Notoparmelia is a genus of foliose lichens in the family Parmeliaceae. It includes 18 species that grow on bark and rocks, and are mostly distributed in the Southern Hemisphere. The genus was created in 2014 as a segregate of Parmelia.

== Taxonomy ==
Notoparmelia was circumscribed by lichenologists Ana Crespo, Zuzana Ferencová, and Pradeep Divakar in 2014. The genus includes a group of mostly Australasian species previously placed in Parmelia. Although the group of species had previously been shown to form a monophyletic lineage in Parmelia, they had not at that time been examined sufficiently to identify any morphological features that could be used to distinguish them from Parmelia. Subsequent study of the anatomy and fine morphology of the ascomata and ascospores revealed differences that could be used as diagnostic characters to define a new genus for this lineage of species.

Notoparmelia differs morphologically from Parmelia species by having thinner ascospore walls and a proper exciple (a layer of hyphae directly surrounding and derived from the ascocarp itself, not including any thalline material) that is reduced to one layer without zonation and comprising exclusively loosely branched large hyphae embedded in an abundant polysaccharide matrix. The proper exciple is surrounded by a continuous layer of algae. The genus name combines the Greek nǒto- ("southern", "south" – referring to its Southern Hemisphere distribution) with Parmelia.

The name Aspidelia is an earlier legitimate generic name for the genus that was overlooked when Notoparmelia was published. The authors later formally proposed Aspidelia for rejection so that Notoparmelia could be retained. In 2017, however, the Nomenclature Committee for Fungi rejected the proposal, preferring that priority should take precedence. Despite this, as of 2020, no proposal had been made to transfer Notoparmelia species to Aspidelia, and Notoparmelia is used in recent reviews of fungal classification.

== Description ==
Notoparmelia species have a foliose thallus that is adnate (attached to the substratum) to loosely adnate (loosely attached to nearly free growing). It is irregularly lobate (having lobes), with lobes measuring 2.0–7.0 mm wide with rounded tips. Pseudocyphellae are usually effigurate (having marginal areoles that are extended and arranged radially). Rhizines are squarrosely branched (branching at right angles). The apothecia are stipitate or nearly so, and split radially with age. The proper exciple is cup-shaped, with a single thick (30–70 μm) hyaline layer. Unlike other parmelioids, it is not differentiated into three layers. Ascospores are ellipsoid, typically measuring 11.5–16.5 by 7.5–10 μm with a spore wall that is less than 1 μm thick. In contrast, other parmelioids have spore walls greater than 1 μm thick.

== Species ==
As of November 2025, Species Fungorum (in the Catalogue of Life) accepts 18 species of Notoparmelia:

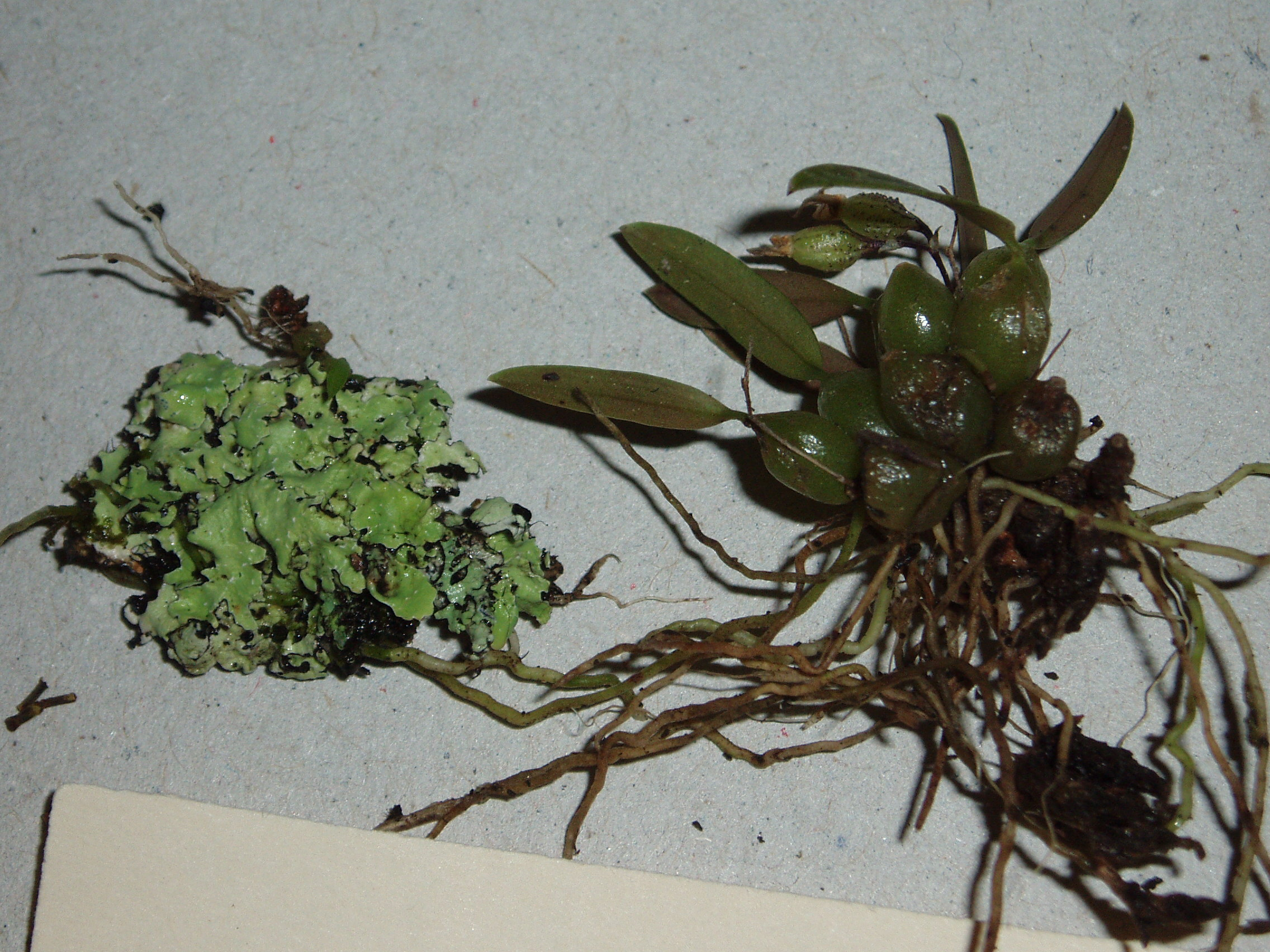
Notoparmelia testacea

- Notoparmelia crambidiocarpa (Zahlbr.) A.Crespo, Ferencová & Divakar (2014)
- Notoparmelia crowii (Elix) A.Crespo, Ferencová & Divakar (2014)
- Notoparmelia cunninghamii (Cromb.) A.Crespo, Ferencová & Divakar (2014)
- Notoparmelia erumpens (Kurok.) A.Crespo, Ferencová & Divakar (2014)
- Notoparmelia kerguelensis (F.Wilson) Fryday (2019)
- Notoparmelia lindsayana (Øvstedal & Elix) Fryday (2019)
- Notoparmelia norcrambidiocarpa (Hale) A.Crespo, Ferencová & Divakar (2014)
- Notoparmelia nortestacea (Elix) A.Crespo, Ferencová & Divakar (2014)
- Notoparmelia novae-zelandiae (Hale) A.Crespo, Ferencová & Divakar (2014)
- Notoparmelia protosignifera (Elix & J.Johnston) Kantvilas (2024)
- Notoparmelia protosulcata (Hale) A.Crespo, Ferencová & Divakar (2014)
- Notoparmelia pseudotenuirima (Gyeln.) A.Crespo, Ferencová & Divakar (2014)
- Notoparmelia queenslandensis (Hale) A.Crespo, Ferencová & Divakar (2014)
- Notoparmelia salcrambidiocarpa (Hale) A.Crespo, Ferencová & Divakar (2014)
- Notoparmelia signifera (Nyl.) A.Crespo, Ferencová & Divakar (2014)
- Notoparmelia subtestacea (Hale) A.Crespo, Ferencová & Divakar (2014)
- Notoparmelia tarkinensis (Elix & Kantvilas) A.Crespo, Ferencová & Divakar (2014)
- Notoparmelia tenuirima (Hook. f. & Taylor) A.Crespo, Ferencová & Divakar (2014)
- Notoparmelia testacea (Stirt.) A.Crespo, Ferencová & Divakar (2014)

== Chemistry ==
Notoparmelia testacea and N. subtestacea contain testacein, a polyketide-sesquiterpene compound that has also been found in the lichen genera Pyxine, Heterodermia, and Buellia.
