= Parmelia adaugescens =

Scientific classification
- Kingdom: Fungi
- Division: Ascomycota
- Class: Lecanoromycetes
- Order: Lecanorales
- Family: Parmeliaceae
- Genus: Parmelia
- Species: P. adaugescens

Binomial name
- Parmelia adaugescens Nyl. (1890)

Synonyms
- Parmelia pseudomarmariza D.D.Awasthi (1977)

Species of lichen-forming fungus

Parmelia adaugescens is a species of corticolous (bark-dwelling) foliose lichen in the family Parmeliaceae. Originally described from Japan in 1890, this lichen is widespread across Asia, occurring from Pakistan through the Himalayas to Japan and Taiwan, where it grows on tree bark in humid temperate to subtropical forests. The species forms rosette-shaped growths 8–15 cm across with long, overlapping lobes that have a shiny surface marked by conspicuous pale pores, and it produces relatively large ascospores with a thick outer wall that help distinguish it from related species. It is often found growing alongside other large-lobed Parmelia species in environments ranging from lowland to montane forests, favouring areas with consistent humidity throughout the year.

== Taxonomy ==
Parmelia adaugescens was described by William Nylander in 1890 from material collected in Japan by Sigfried Almquist; Nylander's herbarium at H (Helsinki) holds the type material. A later name, Parmelia pseudomarmariza, proposed by Dharani Dhar Awasthi in 1976 and based on a collection from the Mewa Khola valley (Taplejung District, eastern Nepal), is now treated as a synonym of P. adaugescens.

== Description ==
Parmelia adaugescens is a bark-dwelling, rather firm foliose lichen forming rosettes 8–15 cm across. Its lobes are long, overlapping and more or less linear, 2–5 mm wide. The upper surface is shiny and flat when young but becomes finely wrinkled and pitted with age and may crack across older parts. Conspicuous, irregular pale pores (pseudocyphellae) occur on the margins and the lobe faces, usually separate but sometimes joining into a loose network, each 0.5–1.5 mm long. The undersurface of the thallus is black and densely covered with root-like holdfasts (rhizines) that are simple, forked or dichotomously branched, 1–2 mm long.

Asexual structures are frequent but small: pycnidia are common yet poorly developed and produce straight cylindrical conidia 7–8 μm long. Apothecia are common; they sit close to the thallus (somewhat sessile), are urn-shaped (urceolate) with inrolled margins when young, and reach 4–8 mm in diameter. The thalline margin is rugose and also bears pseudocyphellae. The hymenium is 65–70 μm tall. Ascospores are relatively large, 13–15 × 21–27 μm, with a distinct outer wall (epispore) 2–3 μm thick.

Chemically, the species contains atranorin, salazinic acid and consalazinic acid.

== Habitat and distribution ==
Parmelia adaugescens is a widespread Asian species, most common in Japan and Taiwan but extending westward to Pakistan. It grows on tree bark in temperate to subtropical regions and is often associated with other large-lobed species of Parmelia. The lichen favours humid environments and occurs from lowland to montane forests. Material described from Nepal under the name P. pseudomarmariza represents the same species, indicating that its range also includes parts of the Himalayas. In Nepal, Parmelia adaugescens has been reported from 3,300 to 3,600 m elevation in a compilation of published records.
