= Parmelia sulymae =

Scientific classification
- Kingdom: Fungi
- Division: Ascomycota
- Class: Lecanoromycetes
- Order: Lecanorales
- Family: Parmeliaceae
- Genus: Parmelia
- Species: P. sulymae

Binomial name
- Parmelia sulymae Goward, Divakar, M.C.Molina & A.Crespo (2017)
- Holotype: Clearwater River drainage, British Columbia, Canada

Species of lichen

Parmelia sulymae is a species of foliose lichen in the family Parmeliaceae. Found in humid forests of north-western North America. It was described in 2017 on the basis of morphology and DNA data that set it apart from lookalikes in the Parmelia saxatilis group, especially P. hygrophila. In practice, it is recognised by its narrow lobes, its tendency to produce compact granular propagules along the lobe margins, and its fine, often forking root‑like holdfasts on the lower surface. The species was named after Randy Sulyma, a British Columbia biologist, through a conservation auction where his family purchased the naming rights to help protect parkland. Like its close relatives, it reproduces mainly by shedding tiny packages of fungus and algae rather than producing spores, making it well-suited to the consistently moist conditions of old-growth forests.

== Taxonomy ==
The species was described new to science in 2017 by Trevor Goward, Pradeep Divakar, María del Carmen Molina, and Ana Crespo, with the holotype from the Clearwater River drainage in British Columbia, Canada, collected on dead subalpine fir (Abies lasiocarpa). The epithet honours the British Columbia biologist Randy Sulyma (1968–2011); his family purchased the naming rights for $17,900 at a conservation auction, with proceeds going to a campaign to secure a wildlife corridor linking the two southern arms of Wells Gray Provincial Park; Goward described the auction as an early instance of 'taxonomic tithing'.

Molecular analyses using internal transcribed spacer rDNA and the protein‑coding gene MCM7 recovered P. sulymae as a distinct clade within the broad P. saxatilis complex; in that tree it is closely related to P. serrana. The same study separated several British Columbia morphotypes, describing both P. sulymae and P. imbricaria as new species, while showing that two other morphs fell within P. saxatilis in the strict sense.

Although superficially similar to P. hygrophila (both produce compact, isidia‑like granules), P. sulymae differs in consistently narrower lobes, the way its propagules start along the lobe margins, and its more frequently forking rhizines. Where the lichen grows on rock, some specimens can be coarse and hard to separate from P. hygrophila by eye; in such cases the authors indicate that sequence data may be needed.

== Description ==
The thallus (the lichen body) is foliose, typically 5–8 cm across (occasionally to 12 cm), and attached flush to the substrate. Lobes are narrow, usually 1–2 mm wide (rarely to 3 mm), elongate and irregularly branched, and tend not to overlap. The upper surface is pale greenish‑grey to bluish‑grey, sometimes brownish at the tips, and may show fine white dots or lines called pseudocyphellae, which are tiny breaks in the skin that help with gas exchange and often form low net‑like ridges with age.

Vegetative reproduction is by compact granules the authors call "sorsidia" (their term for tightly packed soredia). Soredia are small powdery packets of fungus and algae that flake off and start new lichens; in P. sulymae these are denser than usual and commonly start at the lobe edge before spreading over the surface along the pseudocyphellae. The lower surface is dark brown near the tips but otherwise black, smooth and shiny, with abundant rhizines (minute, hair‑like anchors) that often fork from their base; on this species they can reach about 1–1.5 mm long and extend right to the lobe tips. Sexual structures are uncommon: apothecia (disc‑like spore cups) are rare and abortive in the material examined, and pycnidia (asexual spore organs) were not seen. Standard spot tests are consistent with the presence of the common secondary metabolites (lichen products) atranorin and salazinic acid, e.g., KC+ (yellow becoming red); P+ (orange).

In side‑by‑side comparisons the species is best separated from P. hygrophila by the combination of its narrower lobes, more obviously marginal origin of sorsidia, and its frequently forking rhizines; it also differs from superficially similar taxa such as P. squarrosa (which has distinctive squarrose, not forking, rhizines). Rock‑dwelling material of P. sulymae can mimic P. hygrophila, reinforcing the point that some specimens are difficult to identify without lab work.

== Habitat and distribution ==
Parmelia sulymae is characteristic of mature, humid forests. It is most often found on the branches and upper trunks of conifers—especially fir (Abies), spruce (Picea), and hemlock (Tsuga)—and only rarely on deciduous trees such as balsam poplar (Populus balsamifera). Field notes emphasise cool forest microclimates with intermittent sunfleck. The species occasionally occurs on rock (saxicolous) in sheltered outcrops, where its appearance can be coarser.

The known range is restricted to north‑western North America. Most records are from low to mid‑elevations in humid parts of intermontane British Columbia, Canada, with additional collections from adjacent Idaho, USA. A few coastal occurrences are documented, apparently confined to the middle and upper tree crown. Compared with P. hygrophila, a better‑known regional endemic, P. sulymae is described as more hygrophytic—more tied to persistently moist forest air.
