= Parmelia protosignifera =

Scientific classification
- Kingdom: Fungi
- Division: Ascomycota
- Class: Lecanoromycetes
- Order: Lecanorales
- Family: Parmeliaceae
- Genus: Parmelia
- Species: P. protosignifera

Binomial name
- Parmelia protosignifera Elix & J.Johnst. (1988)

Species of lichen

Parmelia protosignifera is a species of foliose lichen in the large family Parmeliaceae. Found in Australasia, it was described as a new species in 1988 by lichenologists John Elix and Jen Johnston. The type specimen was collected on sheltered granite ledges in Eucalyptus woodland on the eastern slopes on Tinderry Peak in New South Wales. It has also been collected in Victoria, as well as South Island and Stewart Island of New Zealand.

== Description ==
Parmelia protosignifera has a thick, leathery thallus, pale grey to brownish in colour, measuring 8–15 cm (3–6 in) in diameter. The thallus comprises crowded, overlapping lobes measuring 2–10 mm (0.08–0.4 in) wide. Soredia and isidia are absent from the thallus. Apothecia are common, and they are 4–8 mm (0.16–0.31 in) wide with a concave disc and pseudocyphellae on the margin of the exciple. Ascospores are 11–15 by 8–9 μm.

Parmelia protosignifera is morphologically quite similar to Notoparmelia signifera, a species with which it has been previously confused, and after which it is named. The two lichens can be distinguished chemically: P. protosignifera has salazinic acid in the medulla, resulting in a K+ yellow-dark red spot test, while N. signifera contains protocetraric acid, which leads to a K+ pale yellow-brown spot test.
