= Parmelia ambra =

Scientific classification
- Kingdom: Fungi
- Division: Ascomycota
- Class: Lecanoromycetes
- Order: Lecanorales
- Family: Parmeliaceae
- Genus: Parmelia
- Species: †P. ambra

Binomial name
- †Parmelia ambra Poinar, E.B.Peterson & Platt (2000)

Species of lichen

Parmelia ambra is a fossilised species of foliose lichen in the family Parmeliaceae. Found in Dominican amber and described as a new species in 2000, the fossil has been used in subsequent studies of lichen evolution.

== Taxonomy ==
The fossil was discovered in Dominican amber and formally described as a new species in 2000 by George Poinar Jr., Eric Peterson, and Jamie Platt. Because of its resemblance to modern-day members of Parmelia, it has been placed provisionally in that genus, although the authors acknowledge that without sacrificing more of the specimen for analysis, it is impossible to assert this definitively.

Based on what types of organisms are used for dating, Dominican amber dates from 15–20 million years ago (based on foraminifera fossils), to 30–45 million years (based on coccolith fossils). Because lichens are scarce in the fossil record, specimens like this are often used as calibration points for molecular clock analyses to improve understanding of lichen evolution.

== Description ==
The fossil lichen has a thallus comprising dichotomously branched lobes with a thickness of 30–50 μm. The upper thallus surface is smooth and lighter in colour than the lower surface, which is black with dark rhizines measuring 0.5–0.9 mm long. Neither apothecia nor pycnidia are apparent on the fossil. A single isidium is present, with a length of 110 μm and diameter of 50 μm. The hyphae of the medulla are thick-walled, loosely interwoven, and have a diameter of 0.8–2.3 μm. Algal cells, rounded to somewhat elliptic in shape and measuring 5.8–11.6 μm, are present at the interface between the cortex and the medulla.
