= Parmelia imbricaria =

Scientific classification
- Domain: Eukaryota
- Kingdom: Fungi
- Division: Ascomycota
- Class: Lecanoromycetes
- Order: Lecanorales
- Family: Parmeliaceae
- Genus: Parmelia
- Species: P. imbricaria

Binomial name
- Parmelia imbricaria Goward, Divakar, M.C.Molina & A.Crespo (2017)

Species of lichen

Parmelia imbricaria is a species of foliose lichen in the family Parmeliaceae. Found in western Canada, it was formally described as a new species in 2017 by Trevor Goward, Pradeep Kumar Divakar, María del Carmen Molina, and Ana Crespo. The type specimen was collected by Goward near the Clearwater River drainage (British Columbia, Canada), where it was found at an elevation of 700 m (2,300 ft) growing on a basalt boulder. The specific epithet refers to the "imbricate" (closely overlapping) lobes of the thallus. The lichen occurs in western Canada, with a range including southern Yukon and extending south to southern inland British Columbia. The European Parmelia pinatifida is a closely related species.

== Description ==
Parmelia imbricaria is a foliose (leaf-like) lichen that typically grows 5–10 cm (2–4 in) in diameter, though specimens can reach up to 15 cm (6 in) across. It grows flat against its substrate, ranging from loosely to closely attached. The lichen is characterised by its small lobes that measure 1–2 mm wide, which start out concave when young and become flat to slightly convex as they mature. These primary lobes branch irregularly and develop even smaller secondary lobes (0.2–0.5 mm wide) that strongly overlap each other like shingles, giving the species its name.

The upper surface appears pale bluish-grey, turning dark brown in exposed areas. It can be dull or slightly shiny, with or without a powdery coating (pruina). White linear markings called pseudocyphellae appear primarily along the lobe margins, sometimes forming a subtle net-like pattern across the upper surface. The lower surface is black, smooth and shiny, with numerous root-like (rhizines) that help anchor the lichen. These rhizines are black, measure up to 1 mm long, and can be either simple or forked.

When viewed in cross-section, the lichen body is 100–180 micrometres (μm) thick, composed of several distinct layers: an upper cortex (20–40 μm), an photobiont layer (25–35 μm), a medulla (60–90 μm), and a lower cortex (20–50 μm).

Reproductive structures (apothecia) are rare in this species, appearing as disc-like organs 2–4 mm across with dark orange-brown centres. When present, these produce ellipsoid spores measuring 12–17 by 9–13 μm, with 8 spores per ascus (spore sac). Small black pycnidia (another type of reproductive structure) are common, producing oblong-elliptic conidia (asexual spores) 4–5 by 2 μm in size.

The lichen produces two chemical compounds that can be detected through standard tests: atranorin in the cortex (which gives a yellow reaction with KC) and salazinic acid in the medulla (which turns orange with PD). These compounds help distinguish it from similar species and may serve protective functions.

Parmelia imbricaria can be distinguished from related species by its combination of marginal pseudocyphellae, abundantly overlapping secondary lobes, and the presence of salazinic acid as its only medullary compound.
