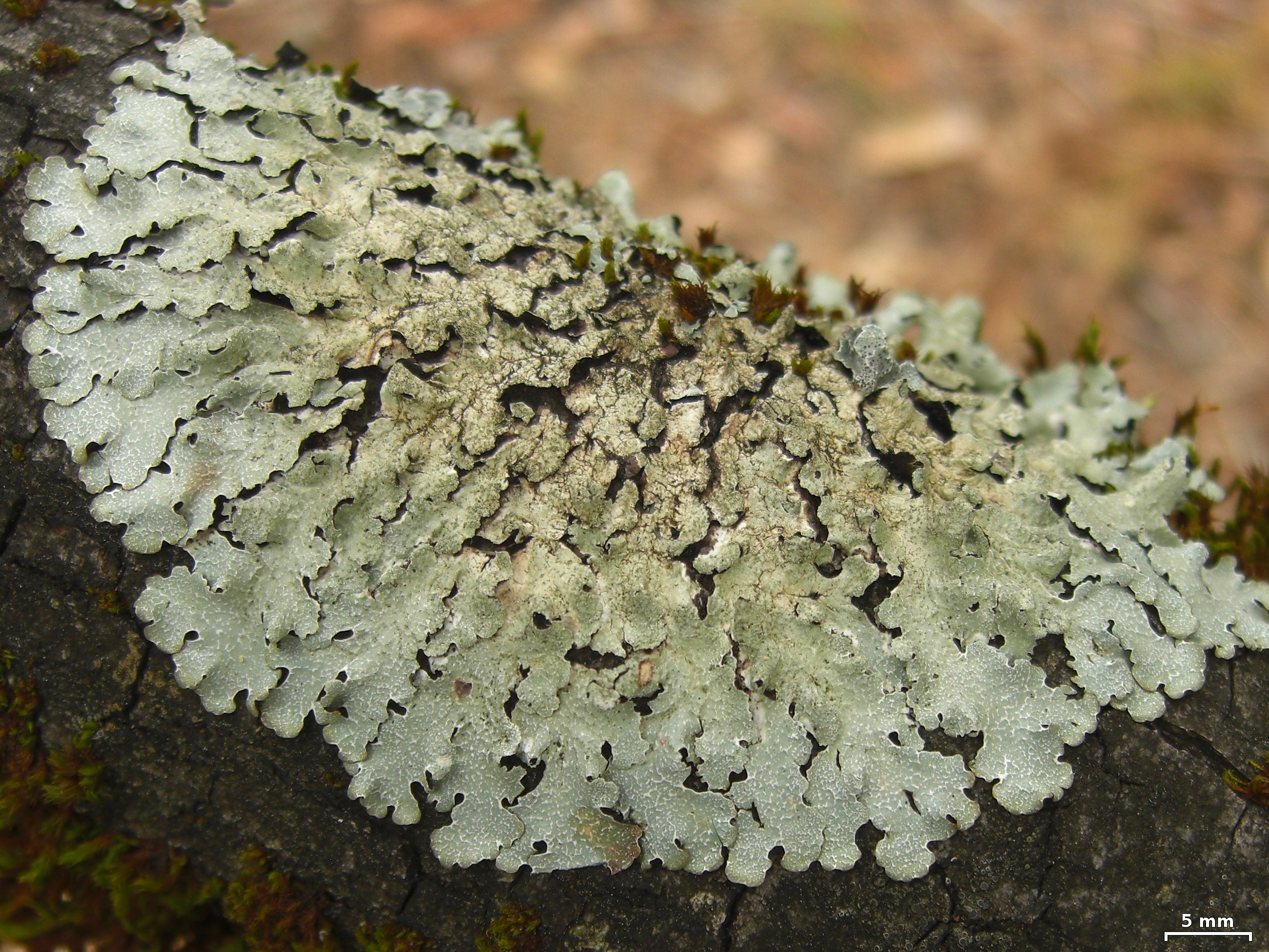

Conservation status
- Secure (NatureServe)

Scientific classification
- Kingdom: Fungi
- Division: Ascomycota
- Class: Lecanoromycetes
- Order: Lecanorales
- Family: Parmeliaceae
- Genus: Parmelia
- Species: P. hygrophila

Binomial name
- Parmelia hygrophila Goward & Ahti (1983)
- Holotype: Kokanee Creek Provincial Park, British Columbia

= Parmelia hygrophila =

Species of lichen

Parmelia hygrophila is a corticolous (bark-dwelling) foliose lichen in the Parmelia saxatilis group, described in 1983 from the Pacific Northwest of North America. It was segregated from material that had often been folded into a broad concept of P. saxatilis. The species is characterised by its greyish-green, leafy thallus that produces abundant tiny outgrowths called isidia along the lobe margins and upper surface for reproduction. It grows in the humid forests of the Pacific Northwest, growing on the bark of both coniferous and deciduous trees from coastal regions to mid-elevation mountain forests. The species was named from collections made in interior British Columbia and is now recorded from Alaska, British Columbia, Washington, and Idaho.

== Taxonomy ==
Parmelia hygrophila was described as new to science by Trevor Goward and Teuvo Ahti in 1983, based on a type collected at Kokanee Creek Provincial Park, British Columbia (holotype UBC). In proposing the species, the authors placed it within the P. saxatilis group and explained that western North American material with abundant isidia had frequently been treated under a broad P. saxatilis concept or linked to infraspecific names later shown to refer to different taxa. Their account provided a diagnostic key separating P. hygrophila from look-alikes in the complex.

Molecular phylogenies place Parmelia hygrophila within the P. saxatilis group, where it forms a clade with P. submontana. In the dated evolutionary tree, P. submontana appears to have evolved from within P. hygrophila (making P. hygrophila paraphyletic, meaning it does not include all its evolutionary descendants), and their split is estimated to have occurred in the mid-Pleistocene, about 1.3 million years ago (with a confidence range of 380,000 to 2.91 million years ago).

== Description ==
The thallus forms rosettes about 4–10 cm across, attached moderately to rather loosely to the substrate. Lobes are 1–5 mm wide, usually somewhat elongate and branching, with a pale to dark greenish-grey upper surface that can appear bluish grey in some specimens. The surface shows scattered, often fissure-like pseudocyphellae (tiny, pale breaks in the cortex that aid gas exchange). Isidia (minute outgrowths used for vegetative reproduction) are abundant on the lobe margins and upper surface; they are initially cylindrical but frequently become powdery (soredioid), a feature illustrated in the original figures. Apothecia are uncommon, small (to about 2 mm), with simple, colourless ascospores about 14–16 × 9–12 μm; pycnidia were not observed. The lower surface is dark with non-squarrose rhizines (root-like attachments). In standard spot tests the cortex is K+ (yellow); the medulla is K+ (yellow turning red), C−, KC−, PD+ (orange); thin-layer chromatography shows atranorin and salazinic acid. These characters, together with its bark-dwelling habit, distinguish P. hygrophila from the typically rock-dwelling P. saxatilis and related species.

=== Similar species ===
Parmelia hygrophila can be confused with the recently described P. sulymae, which also bears compact, isidia-like soredia ("sorsidia"); however, in P. sulymae these propagules arise chiefly along lobe margins, the lobes are generally narrower (often 1–2 mm), and rhizines more frequently bifurcate.

Asian material described as P. hygrophiloides is very similar in appearance and chemistry (atranorin with salazinic-series compounds; abundant isidia that can become granular/soredioid). It differs mainly in having squarrose (branched like a bottlebrush) rhizines, whereas P. hygrophila has non-squarrose rhizines; the Indian species also tends to show dense, short-cylindrical to coralloid isidia and a shiny, finely wrinkled black lower surface. It may also be confused with P. squarrosa (which has brown-tipped, syncorticate isidial apices that do not become sorediate).

== Habitat and distribution ==
Parmelia hygrophila is an epiphyte of humid to subhumid forests at low to middle elevations in the Pacific Northwest. It grows on a wide range of conifers and broad-leaved trees and shrubs, including hemlock (Tsuga heterophylla), Douglas-fir (Pseudotsuga menziesii), true firs (Abies spp.), spruces (Picea spp.), juniper (Juniperus scopulorum), pine (Pinus spp.), bigleaf maple (Acer macrophyllum), red alder (Alnus spp.), and Garry oak (Quercus garryana). Microhabitats are typically shaded and sheltered (for example, the lee sides of trunks). It is scarce in the arid interior zones of British Columbia and uncommon at alpine tree line; within oceanic to suboceanic regions it can be abundant in shaded urban parks maintained by high humidity. A distribution map in the protologue shows records from Alaska, British Columbia (coastal and "Interior Wet Belt"), Washington, and scattered sites in Idaho.

Systematic surveys in western Oregon and Washington found Parmelia hygrophila widespread in forest canopies, with records on 38.4% of unbiased ('on-frame') plots (81 of 211) and 758 detections overall, indicating that the species is common across the region.

== Ecology ==
In interior cedar–hemlock rainforests of north-central British Columbia, P. hygrophila occurs on western hemlock branches and is markedly more frequent and abundant on regeneration growing within surrounding old-growth stands than in nearby even-aged patches of the same age (about 120–140 years). In that study, P. hygrophila was recorded on 100% of old-growth branches sampled (mean relative cover about 5.2%) but only 66% of branches in even-aged stands (about 1.2%), a statistically significant difference. The species tended to be most common in mid-canopy positions of old-growth trees, grouping with other 'old-growth-associated' chlorolichens. The species was one of a small set of chlorolichens (with Cavernularia hultenii, Hypogymnia vittata, Platismatia norvegica, and Usnea spp.) that tracked old-growth structure, likely reflecting the cooler, more humid canopy microclimate of multi-aged stands.

Community analyses in the same regional dataset identify P. hygrophila as characteristic of montane lichen communities (and present in high-elevation suites), consistent with its preference for cooler, more continental forest zones. Within Pacific Northwest forests, P. hygrophila tends to occur as part of the mid- to upper-canopy macrolichen funga used to track climate gradients; in this framework it aligns with montane/high-elevation indicator assemblages rather than lowland or maritime communities.

In a 700-year-old Douglas-fir canopy in western Oregon, unbiased litterfall sampling detected P. hygrophila significantly more often and in greater amounts along a clearcut edge than in the forest interior. Within the same canopy, Parmelia species (including P. hygrophila) were concentrated in the exposed portion of the vertical microclimate gradient—occurring on 54% of exposed samples, 22% of intermediate samples, and 0% of sheltered samples—with low mean cover. These data place P. hygrophila among upper-canopy 'other lichens' that favour brighter, drier microsites, contrasting with bryophytes and many cyanolichens that peak in sheltered, humid positions.
