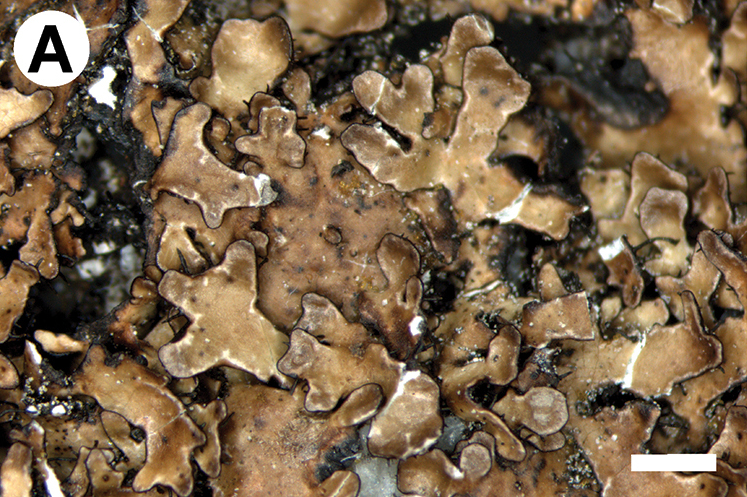
- scale bar = 200 micrometres

Scientific classification
- Kingdom: Fungi
- Division: Ascomycota
- Class: Lecanoromycetes
- Order: Lecanorales
- Family: Parmeliaceae
- Genus: Parmelia
- Species: P. discordans

Binomial name
- Parmelia discordans Nyl. (1886)

Synonyms
- Parmelia omphalodes var. discordans (Nyl.) H.Magn. (1929); Parmelia omphalodes subsp. discordans (Nyl.) Skult (1984)

= Parmelia discordans =

Species of lichen

Parmelia discordans is a species of saxicolous (rock-dwelling) foliose lichen in the family Parmeliaceae. Found in Europe, it is closely related and similar in appearance to the more widespread Parmelia omphalodes. It was formally described in 1886 by William Nylander from specimens collected on porphyry rock outcrops in southern Finland. The lichen is characterised by its dark blackish-brown thallus with short, overlapping lobes, a shiny upper surface with marginal pale pores, and a black lower surface. It grows on siliceous rocks in lowland areas and is most frequently recorded in northern Europe.

== Taxonomy ==
Parmelia discordans was introduced to science by the Finnish lichenologist William Nylander in 1886. In his description, he compared it to Parmelia prolixa var. pannariiformis, noting that it differed in having a medulla with a pale yellowish tint when treated with potassium hydroxide (the K test), rather than the rusty-yellow reaction seen in the latter taxon. Nylander reported the species from porphyry outcrops in southern Finland, including sites such as Kotikallio, Mustjyrkänvuori, and Välikallio, often occurring alongside Parmelia saxatilis and frequently bearing patches of the lichenicolous fungus species Dothidea homostegia.

Parmelia discordans is closely related to P. omphalodes, and some have suggested that they are the same species. Molecular phylogenetics confirms their close relations, as they have a sister taxon relationship.

== Description ==
The thallus is closely attached to the substrate to only slightly lifting, very fragile and brittle, and dark to blackish-brown, usually 4–8 cm across. Lobes are short, overlapping and more or less linear, 1–3 mm wide, and often develop small secondary lobules with age. The upper surface is even to faintly pitted, shiny and largely continuous, becoming only sparsely cracked in older parts. Tiny pale pores (pseudocyphellae) occur mainly along the lobe margins, with a few on older lobe faces; they are small (0.2–0.5 mm long), elongate, and may merge to form a loose, mainly marginal, reticulate band. The lower surface is black with sparse to moderate rhizines that are simple to forked and 1–1.5 mm long.

Fruiting bodies are uncommon: apothecia occur on about a quarter of the material examined in Finland, are adnate to subsessile, and 2–5 mm in diameter; the thalline margin shows a reticulum of pseudocyphellae and the disc is flat. The hymenium is 55–60 micrometres (μm) tall. Ascospores measure 8–10 × 14–16 μm with an epispore 1.5–2 μm thick. Asexual structures are rare: pycnidia are infrequent and produce straight to slightly curved cylindrical conidia 5.5–6.5 μm long.

Chemically, the species contains atranorin, protocetraric acid and lobaric acid, with accessory substances including galbinic acid, fumarprotocetraric acid and some unidentified fatty acids.

== Habitat and distribution ==
Parmelia discordans grows on siliceous rock. It is most frequent in the lowlands of northern Europe; in central Europe it is often not separated from related taxa in the field or herbarium, so records there are probably under-reported. An Austrian record has been judged doubtful.

Within Europe it has been reported from Belgium, Germany, Denmark, Spain, France, Finland, the United Kingdom, Ireland, Norway, the Netherlands, Poland, Russia, Sweden, and Turkey.
