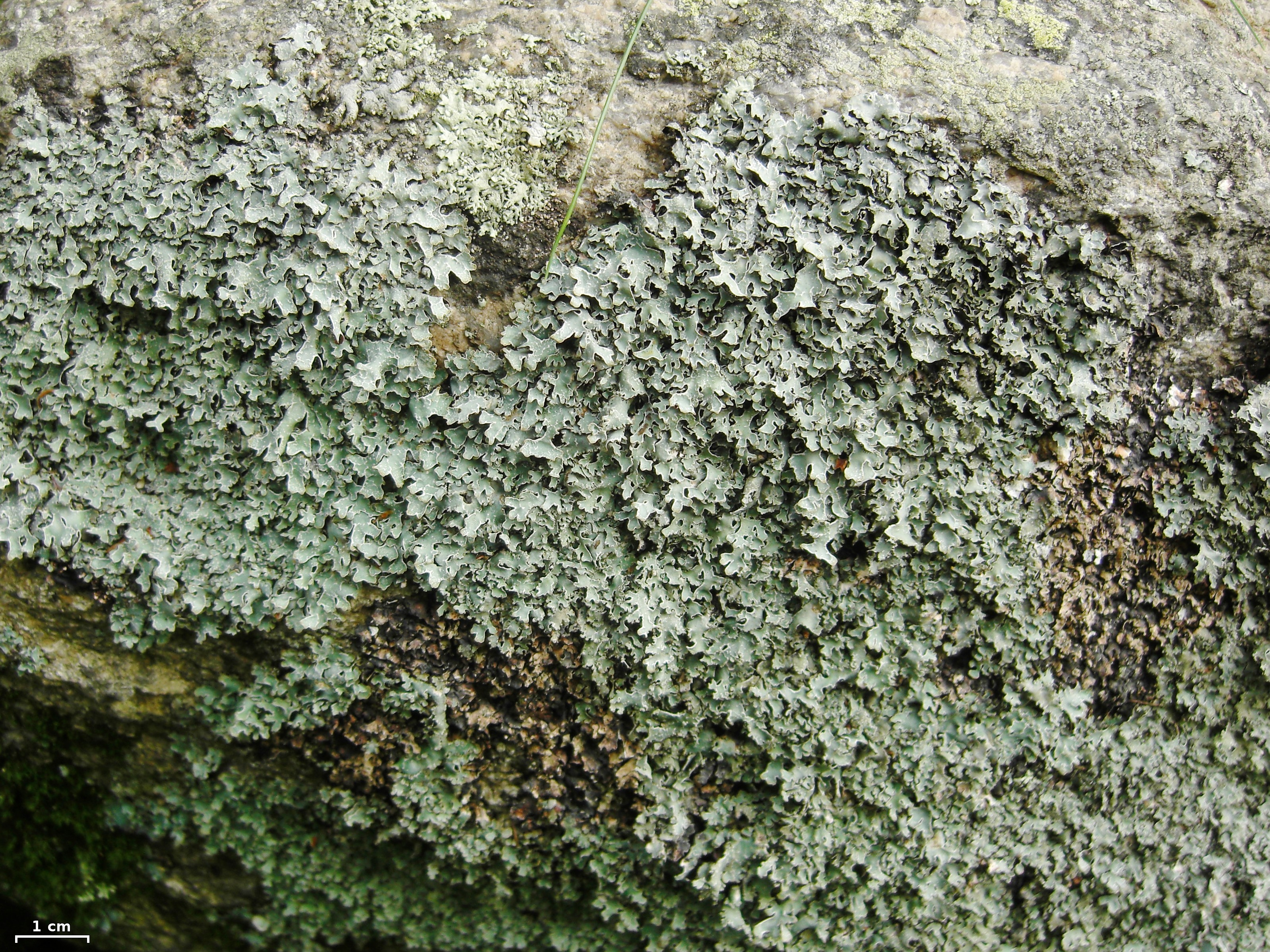
- on Jane Bald peak, Roan Mountain (Tennessee border, USA)

Conservation status
- Secure (NatureServe)

Scientific classification
- Kingdom: Fungi
- Division: Ascomycota
- Class: Lecanoromycetes
- Order: Lecanorales
- Family: Parmeliaceae
- Genus: Parmelia
- Species: P. omphalodes

Binomial name
- Parmelia omphalodes (L.) Ach. (1803)

Synonyms
- Lichen omphalodes L. (1753); Psora omphalodes (L.) Baumg. (1790); Parmelia saxatilis subsp. omphalodes (L.) Nyl. (1876); Parmelia saxatilis var. omphalodes (L.) Fr. (1831); Imbricaria omphalodes (L.) Jatta (1900); Parmotrema omphalodes (L.) M.Choisy (1952)

= Parmelia omphalodes =

Species of lichen-forming fungus

Parmelia omphalodes is a species of foliose lichen in the family Parmeliaceae. It is one of the several dozen lichen species first described in 1753 by Carl Linnaeus. Swedish lichenologist Erik Acharius transferred it to the genus Parmelia in 1803. The lichen is widely distributed, having been recorded in Asia, Africa, Europe, and North and South Americas. In Nepal, Parmelia omphalodes has been reported from 3,500 to 4,500 m elevation in a compilation of published records; this reported range extends above the tree line used in the study. Morphologically similar–but genetically distinct–species include Parmelia discordans and P. pinnatifida.

== See also ==
- List of lichens named by Carl Linnaeus
