= Lobaric acid =

Names
- IUPAC name 3-Hydroxy-9-methoxy-6-oxo-7-pentanoyl-1-pentylbenzo[b][1,4]benzodioxepine-2-carboxylic acid
- Other names Lobraric acid; stereocaulic acid

Identifiers
CAS Number	522-53-2
3D model (JSmol)	Interactive image
ChEBI	CHEBI:93548
ChEMBL	ChEMBL551842
ChemSpider	65927
PubChem CID	73157
CompTox Dashboard (EPA)	DTXSID30200238
- InChI: InChI=1S/C25H28O8/c1-4-6-8-9-15-21(24(28)29)18(27)13-20-23(15)32-19-12-14(31-3)11-16(17(26)10-7-5-2)22(19)25(30)33-20/h11-13,27H,4-10H2,1-3H3,(H,28,29) Key: JHEWMLHQNRHTQX-UHFFFAOYSA-N
- SMILES: CCCCCC1=C(C(=CC2=C1OC3=CC(=CC(=C3C(=O)O2)C(=O)CCCC)OC)O)C(=O)O

Properties
Chemical formula	C_{25}H_{28}O_{8}
Molar mass	456.491 g·mol^{−1}
Melting point	196–198 °C (385–388 °F; 469–471 K)
- Except where otherwise noted, data are given for materials in their standard state (at 25 °C [77 °F], 100 kPa). Infobox references

Lobaric acid is a chemical compound with the molecular formula C_{25}H_{28}O_{8}. It has been found in the Antarctic lichen Stereocaulon alpinum and a variety of other lichens. It is a member of the depsidone class of compounds.

The first total synthesis of lobaric acid was reported in 2018 by researchers at the Korea Polar Research Institute and Hanyang University. The synthesis was accomplished in 14 total steps, starting with 4-bromophthalic anhydride. Key steps included an Ullmann aryl ether coupling reaction to connect the two main aromatic rings, followed by a seven-membered lactonization reaction to form the final structure. The synthetic route also allowed access to several derivatives of lobaric acid, including methyllobarin, lobarin, and lobarstin, which showed significant protein tyrosine phosphatase 1B (PTP1B) inhibitory activities.
