= Consalazinic acid =

Names
- IUPAC name 5,13,17-trihydroxy-4,12-bis(hydroxymethyl)-7-methyl-2,10,16-trioxatetracyclo[9.7.0.0^{3,8}.0^{14,18}]octadeca-1(11),3(8),4,6,12,14(18)-hexaene-9,15-dione
- Other names 1,4,10-Trihydroxy-5,11-bis(hydroxymethyl)-8-methyl-7H-isobenzofuro[4,5-b][1,4]benzodioxepin-3,7(1H)-dione

Identifiers
CAS Number	77292-23-0
3D model (JSmol)	Interactive image
PubChem CID	162888949
- InChI: InChI=1S/C18H14O10/c1-5-2-8(21)6(3-19)13-9(5)16(23)27-14-7(4-20)12(22)10-11(15(14)26-13)18(25)28-17(10)24/h2,18-22,25H,3-4H2,1H3 Key: VHKZGPSNCSPDGX-UHFFFAOYSA-N
- SMILES: CC1=CC(=C(C2=C1C(=O)OC3=C(O2)C4=C(C(=C3CO)O)C(=O)OC4O)CO)O

Properties
Chemical formula	C_{18}H_{14}O_{10}
Molar mass	390.300 g·mol^{−1}
- Except where otherwise noted, data are given for materials in their standard state (at 25 °C [77 °F], 100 kPa). Infobox references

Consalazinic acid is a chemical compound with the molecular formula C_{18}H_{14}O_{10}. It is classified as a depsidone and is a secondary metabolite produced by a variety of lichens.

Consalazinic acid was first isolated from Parmotrema subisidiosum and described in 1980. It has since been identified in many other lichens.
