= List of castles in Renfrewshire =

This is a list of castles in Renfrewshire, Scotland.

== List ==
Name	Type	Date	Condition	Ownership	Location	Notes	Picture
Auchenbathie Tower	Tower	16th century	Ruin	Private	Howwood; NS3978656492	Associated with William Wallace	
Barr Castle	Tower	16th century	Ruin	Private	Lochwinnoch; NS3468058156		
Blackhall Manor			Occupied				
Belltrees Peel			Ruin		NS3617558778		
Castle Semple			Ruin		NS3705257507		
Cochrane Castle			No remains				
Erskine Castle	Unknown	Unknown	No remains		55.9202°N 4.4763°W		
Gryffe Castle	Unknown	By 15th century	Occupied		Bridge of Weir55.8628°N 4.5824°W	Possibly incorporated in 19th century mansion	
Hawkhead Castle	Tower	By 17th century	No remains		55.8321°N 4.3834°W	Hawkhead Hospital is on the site of the castle	
Houston House	Quadrangular castle	16th Century	Range incorporated in 18th-century mansion		55.871369°N 4.540511°W	Later mansion on the site	
Inch Castle			No remains		55.880°N 4.386°W		
Inchinnan Castle			No remains		55.895966°N 4.4293628°W		
Johnstone Castle	Tower, former castellated mansion	18th century	Undergoing restoration	Private	Johnstone; NS4301462269		
Ranfurly Castle		15th century	Ruin		Bridge of Weir	https://archive.org/stream/castellateddomes04macg#page/230/mode/1up	
Renfrew Castle			No remains		NS51346748		
Stanely Castle		15th century	Ruin		NS4636161623		

== See also ==
- Castles in Scotland
- List of castles in Scotland
- List of listed buildings in Renfrewshire
