= William Ross =

William or Bill Ross may refer to:

== Nobility ==
- William Ross, 8th Lord Ross (died 1640), Scottish nobleman
- William Ross, 10th Lord Ross (died 1656), Scottish nobleman
- William Ross, 12th Lord Ross (c. 1656–1738), Scottish nobleman, soldier and politician
- William Ross, 14th Lord Ross (c. 1720–1754), Scottish nobleman

== Politics ==
- William Ross (New York politician) (died 1830), New York politician, speaker of the State Assembly 1814
- William H. H. Ross (1814–1887), American politician and governor of Delaware
- William Ross (Canadian politician) (1824–1912), merchant, ship builder and politician in Nova Scotia, Canada
- William Ross (Ontario politician) (1854–1937), merchant and politician in Ontario, Canada
- William Benjamin Ross (1855–1929), Canadian politician, lawyer and businessman
- William Roderick Ross (1869–1928), lawyer and politician in British Columbia, Canada
- William Donald Ross (1869–1947), financier, banker and lieutenant governor of Ontario
- William B. Ross (1873–1924), governor of Wyoming
- William Henry Ross (1886–1943), provincial level politician from Alberta, Canada
- Bill Ross (Australian politician) (1888–1966), member of the New South Wales Legislative Assembly
- William Gladstone Ross (1889–1948), lawyer, judge and politician in Saskatchewan, Canada
- Willie Ross, Baron Ross of Marnock (1911–1988), secretary of state for Scotland in the 1960s
- William Cecil Ross (1911–1998), leader of the (communist) Labour Progressive Party of Manitoba in 1945
- William Ross (Unionist politician) (born 1936), Ulster Unionist Party member of parliament until 2001

== Sports ==
- William Ross (cricketer) (fl. 1860), Australian cricketer
- William Ross (footballer, born 1874) (1874–?), English professional footballer active in the 1890s
- William Ross (baseball) (1893–1964), American Negro leagues baseball player
- William Ross (rower) (1900–1992), Canadian Olympic rower
- William Alexander Ross (1913–1942), Scottish rugby player
- William Ross (footballer, born 1921) (1921–1995), Scottish footballer
- William Ross (water polo) (1928–2021), American water polo player who competed in the 1956 Summer Olympics
- Bill Ross (footballer) (1944-2020), Australian rules footballer
- Bill Ross (rugby union) (born 1956), Australian rugby union player
- Eric Ross (William Eric Ross, born 1944), Northern Irish footballer
- Billy Ross (William McClintock Ross, 1909–1969), Irish rugby union player
- Willie Ross (American football) (William James Ross, born 1941), American football player

== Other fields ==
- William Ross (poet) (1762–1790/91), Scottish Gaelic poet
- William Charles Ross (1794–1860), British artist
- William P. Ross (1820–1891), principal chief of the Cherokee Nation
- William Murray Ross (1825–1904), entrepreneur in Melbourne
- William Stewart Ross (1844–1906), Scottish writer and publisher
- W. D. Ross (William David Ross, 1877–1971), British philosopher
- W. E. D. Ross (William Edward Daniel, 1912–1995), Canadian actor, playwright and bestselling writer
- William Ross (theatrical producer) (1915–1994), American producer and stage manager
- William Ross (actor) (1923–2014), Tokyo-based American actor, voice actor, voice director and editor, and the founder of Frontier Enterprises
- William Ross (composer) (born 1948), American composer, orchestrator, arranger, conductor and music director
- William "Jock" Ross (born 1943), Scottish-born Australian outlaw biker
- Bill Ross (art director) (1915–1995), American art director and production designer
- Willie Ross (piper) (William Collie Ross, 1878–1966), Scottish bagpipe player

== Fictional ==
- William Ross (Star Trek), a character in Star Trek

== See also ==
- Willie Ross (disambiguation)
