= Robert Ross, 9th Lord Ross =

Scottish nobleman

Robert Ross, 9th Lord Ross of Halkhead (died August 1648) was a Scottish nobleman.

== Origins ==
Ross was the third son of James Ross, 6th Lord Ross, who died on 17 December 1633, by Margaret, daughter of Walter Scott, 1st Lord Scott of Buccleuch. He succeeded to the peerage following the death of his brother William in August 1640 - William himself having succeeded their elder brother James only four years before.

The Rosses of Halkhead, or Hawkhead, in Renfrewshire, were a Lowland family, not apparently related to the Earls of Ross or the Highland family of Ross of Balnagown.

== Career ==
Ross was served heir of his brother in Broomlands, Melville, Craig and Balgone and other lands. He was on the Committee of War for Edinburgh on 2 February 1646 and was Colonel for Ayrshire and Renfrewshire in 1648.

== Death ==
Ross died unmarried in August 1648 and was succeeded by his great-uncle, William.

Peerage of Scotland
Preceded by William Ross	Lord Ross; 1640–1648	Succeeded by William Ross
