= Kincardine (Ardgay and District) =

Civil parish in Highland Scotland

Kincardine, Ardgay and District: Scottish Gaelic: Ceann Chàrdainn, Àird Ghaoithe
- Location of Kincardine (Ardgay and District) in Highland
- Area: 239.1 sq mi (619 km^{2})
- Population: 648 (2011)
  - Density: 3/sq mi (1.2/km^{2})
- Civil parish: Kincardine
- Community council: Ardgay and District
- Council area: Highland
- Lieutenancy area: Sutherland
- Country: Scotland
- Sovereign state: United Kingdom
- Post town: Ardgay
- Police: Scotland
- Fire: Scottish
- Ambulance: Scottish
- UK Parliament: Caithness, Sutherland and Easter Ross
- Scottish Parliament: Caithness, Sutherland and Ross

Map of Kincardine Parish

Kincardine (Ardgay and District) is an extensive civil parish and Community council area on the south side of the Kyle of Sutherland, within the Highland unitary authority area of Scotland, the largest settlement being Ardgay.

It has an area of 239 square miles and a population of 648 (2011 census). As a civil parish named “Kincardine” it is a unit for various statistical, census, registration and record purposes, while, as “Ardgay and District”, it functions as a community council.

== Etymology ==
Kincardine derives from Gaelic “kin” or “ceann” meaning head and Pictish “cardain” (Welsh cardden) meaning wood. It originally applied to the vicinity of the church, from where it extended to the district looked after by the church, namely the parish. Ardgay derives from the Gaelic words “ard” and “gaoith”, meaning windy height.

== Demographics ==
The civil parish had a population of 647 in 1991, 674 in 2001 and 648 in 2011. Before the Highland Clearances of the mid-19th century, it had a much larger population - 2,108 in the 1841 census.

For the census purposes, Kincardine parish is assigned to five “Output Areas” (OAs). (Population figures in recent censuses are a based on aggregation of OAs). Ardgay, which covers three OAs, has a population of 370 and is the main settlement. It was sufficiently important as to be granted the status of a burgh of barony in 1686, but this was never carried into effect.

Populations of other settlements were too small to be published separately in the census, but Culrain was estimated to have 90 and Croick 22 (both 2001).

In the early 19th century Gaelic was still the language generally spoken, read and understood and even in 1881, 75.8% of the population spoke Gaelic. But in 2011, only 4.6% of the population had some knowledge of Gaelic.

== Geography ==
The district has two main natural divisions. That part drained by the River Carron and its tributaries and that northern part draining into the River Oykel above the Kyle of Sutherland.

Its northern border is formed by the River Oykel, the Kyle of Sutherland and Dornoch Firth, which divide it from the old county of Sutherland. The Oykel arises in the north-west corner at a height of 1,500 ft. from whence it flows 35 miles to the sea, first southward via Loch Ailsh, then east-south-eastwards until it becomes the estuary of the Kyle of Sutherland. In the east, the parish (or district) is bordered by the civil parish of Edderton, to the south by those of Rosskeen, Alness, Fodderty, and Contin, and to the west by the parish of Lochbroom. All these lie in Ross and Cromarty.

The land is mostly hilly with several significant peaks, several on its borders, namely Cnoc Leathad na Siorramachd (1845 ft.), Càrn Chuinneag (2749 ft.) and Breabag (2338 ft.). Also Carn Bhrain, Breac-Bheinn, Beinn Ulbhaidh (formerly Ulamhie) (1616 ft.), Bodach Mor and Carn Loch Sruban Mora within the parish/community council area. It extends 22 miles from east to west.

In the west, the river Einig flows northwards meeting the Oykel below Oykel Bridge.

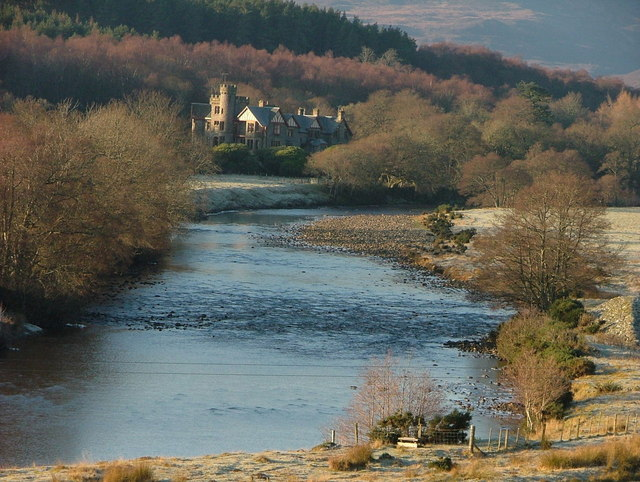
River Carron at Gruinards

Through the centre flows the river Carron and its tributaries, until it flows into the kyle of Sutherland just above Bonar Bridge.

In the north-west of the parish, a triangular salient protrudes almost as far as Ben More Assynt. It has Breabag on its western side and Loch Ailsh and the river Oykel on the eastern side. This salient, north of the Allt Eileag river, around 19 sq. miles, is not included in the Community Council area.

The Far North Line railway from Inverness runs along the south side of Dornoch Firth and the Kyle of Sutherland, serving Ardgay and Culrain, before crossing the Kyle at Invershin on the Shin Railway Viaduct.

The old parish church of Kincardine, after which the parish is named, lies a mile east of Ardgay, close to the eastern parish boundary ( with Edderton).

== History ==
By the 10th century the area was in the province of Ross, which later became an earldom and a county. The Norse place names Gruniard, Amat, Dibidale, Alladale, Langwell, Syal and Carbisdale, in the parish, attest to the Norse settlement of the district.

The diocese of Ross was organised around 1128, in the same area as the Earldom of Ross, and the delineation of parishes arose at this time. Kincardine is not recorded as having changed since then.

The Clan Ross were the inhabitants of the district and, even in the 19th century, they still owned three quarters of the property in the parish and were by much the most prevalent surname.

The Battle of Carbisdale or Invercarron took place near the present Culrain station, 4 miles north-west of Ardgay, in 1650, when the Royalist Marquess of Montrose was defeated by the Covenanter forces led by Archibald Strachan, fighting for the Scottish government.

Sir George Mackenzie's Ross-shire estates were transferred to Cromartyshire by a 1685 Act of Parliament (repealed 1686, re-enacted 1690). As a result, 7,025 acres of the parish, representing 4.5% of the total, were henceforth in the county of Cromartyshire, before its amalgamation with Ross-shire in 1889. Dounie and Amatnatua were in Cromartyshire.

Sheep farming was first introduced into the parish by Sir John Lockhart-Ross in the 1760s or 1770s, which would presage the later decline in population.

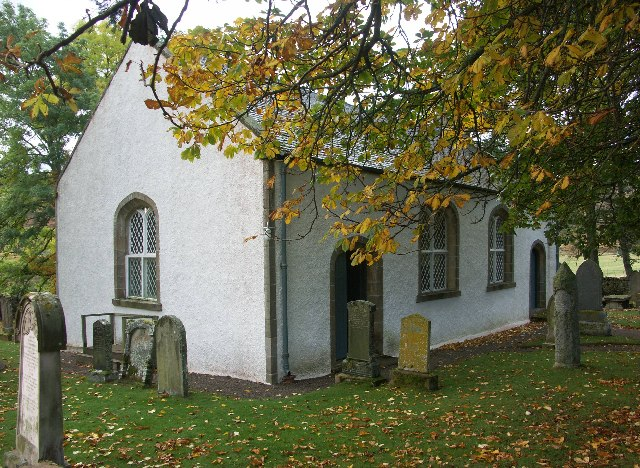
Croick Parish Church (quoad sacra). In the centre of the civil parish, Croick Church was designed by Thomas Telford and built with Government grants in 1827 (ecclesiastical parish 1846). When Glencalvie's population was cleared in 1845, they took refuge at the church. Names of many are scratched into the windows.

For the convenience of inhabitants in the west or central areas, a church was erected at Croick in 1827 and Croick became a “quoad sacra” parish (i.e. remaining in Kincardine for secular purposes) in 1846. Prior to the establishment of Croick Church, additional religious services were held at Amat in Strathcarron and Doune in Strath Oykel.

One of the best documented outrages of the Highland Clearances took place at Croick in 1845. James Gillander, factor to Charles Robertson of Kindeace, evicted 18 families (92 people) from Glencalvie, 3 miles south of Croick, to create a sheep farm. Unable to find accommodation, in desperation 80 people took refuge in the churchyard at Croick.

== Administrative History ==
=== Kirk Session ===
Following the Reformation in 1560, parishes were governed by Kirk Sessions, which were composed of the minister of the parish and the elders of the parish church,. However, it was not until 1804 that records were kept. In 1840 the Kirk Session had 7 members including the minister, with the Kincardine school master acting as clerk.

=== Parochial Board ===
The Parochial Board of Kincardine was established in 1845, being composed of the Heritors of the parish, the Kirk Sessions, and some elected members.

In the 1840s, the Heritors were Charles Ross of Balnagown (Chief of Clan Ross), Lord Cranstoun, the Laird of Novar, and the Duke of Sutherland. They could attend in person or be represented by an agent.

The Kirk Sessions members at the board could not exceed six, so when the Kincardine sessions was greater in size (as in 1840) they would appoint six of their number for the board.

As Kincardine raised a property tax(“Rate”), from mid 1845, in accordance with the Act, three elected members were included in the board.

=== Parish Council ===
Kincardine Parish Council superseded the parochial board in 1894. By determination of Ross and Cromarty County Council, it was established with 9 elected councillors

Kincardine Parish Council was abolished in 1930, but reappeared in local government in 1976 as Ardgay and District Community Council, established under the Local Government (Scotland) Act 1973.

=== District Council ===
After 1930, the parish as a unit formed half of the successor Tain District. It elected half the members of Tain District Council, the remaining being elected by the parishes of Edderton and Tain (“landward”, i.e. non-burghal, part only).

The parish also formed the Kincardine county council electoral division (C.C.E.D.).

=== Community Council ===
By the Local Government (Scotland) Act 1973, county councils and the old districts were abolished, replaced by “Regions” and “Districts”. A new District of Sutherland (within Highland Region) was created by adding the Kincardine electoral division (and therefore the parish) to the county of Sutherland. However, from 1975 to 1983, the Kincardine electoral division remained within the Ross and Cromarty UK Parliament constituency.

As required by the act, Sutherland District Council set up a scheme of community councils for its area., thus, community council boundaries at the edge of the district followed the Sutherland district boundary. On the south, this was the boundary of the former Kincardine electoral division (i.e. the parish). The scheme, which was implemented in 1976, established Ardgay and District community council in that part of the district south of the Oykel and Kyle of Sutherland. The community council has 8 members.

By the Local Government etc. (Scotland) Act 1994, Sutherland District was abolished in 1996 and subsumed in the Highland Unitary Authority, which acquired responsibility for community councils.
