= Chiefs of Clan Ross =

The first chiefs of the Scottish Highland, Clan Ross were also the original Earls of Ross. That title later went to other families in the late 14th century and from then on the chiefs of Clan Ross were designated as "of Balnagowan". This was because their seat was at Balnagowen Castle. The chiefship of the clan has since passed to various branches of the clan. Following the death of David Campbell Ross of Ross and Balnagowan in 2024, Fiona Campbell Ross of Ross and Balnagowan has been recognised as Chief of Clan Ross by the Lord Lyon King of Arms. The following is a list of the chiefs of Clan Ross.

Name of Clan Ross Chief	Chief until	Further details
Fearchar, Earl of Ross (Fequhard 1st Earl of Ross) (Also known as Ferchar mac in tSagairt).	1249	Crushed a rebellion in Moray and Ross, brought the King the heads of the rebel leaders and was knighted on 15 June 1215.
Uilleam I, Earl of Ross (William 2nd Earl of Ross)	1274	Justiciar of Scotland, North. Dau of William Comyn, Earl of Buchan.
Uilleam II, Earl of Ross (William 3rd Earl of Ross)	1323	Changed sides during the Wars of Independence, his son Walter fought at Bannockburn for Scotland.
Aodh, Earl of Ross (Hugh 4th Earl of Ross)	1334	A favorite of King Robert the Bruce. Married the Bruce's sister, Matilda.
Uilleam III, Earl of Ross (William 5th Earl of Ross) The last Chief of Clan Ross that was also Earl of Ross.	1372	Uilleam married the daughter of Aonghus Óg Mac Domhnaill, Lord of Islay. Had a daughter Euphemia I, Countess of Ross (6th Earl of Ross but not Chief of Clan Ross).; Euphemia first married Walter Leslie then divorced. She later married Alexander Stuart. Her child called Alexander Leslie from her first marriage took over as Earl of Ross when she died in 1398.; Alexander Leslie (7th Earl of Ross but not Chief of Clan Ross) married Isabel, daughter of Robert Stuart the Earl of Fife and Duke of Albany.; Alexander's sister Mary married MacDonald, Lord of the Isles, he then claimed right as the Earl of Ross through marriage. The Earldom of Ross would later pass from the Macdonalds to the Stuarts and did not return to the Clan Ross Chief.
Hugh Ross of Rarichies later the 1st of Balnagowan.	1374	Hugh Ross of Rarichies who later became the 1st of Balnagowan was descended from Aodh, 4th Earl of Ross. He took over as Chief of the Clan Ross when Uilleam III 5th Earl of Ross died in 1372, however the title of Earl of Ross had gone elsewhere (see above). Hugh Ross's daughter Jean Ross married Robert de Munro, 8th Baron of Foulis.
William Ross 2nd of Balnagowan	1412	Married Catherine, daughter of Paul Mactire.
Walter Ross 3rd of Balnagowan	1412	?
Hugh Ross 4th of Balnagowan	1497	Married the daughter of the Earl of Sutherland. The Earl of Sutherland was married to Helen Sinclair. Helen Sinclair was the daughter of the Earl of Orkney.
John Ross 5th of Balnagowan	1501	Married Christian daughter MacLeod of Torquil.
Alexander Ross 6th of Balnagowan	1486	Married Dorothy daughter of Alexander Sutherland, 3rd of Duffus. Killed leading the Clan Ross into battle against the Clan Mackay and Clan Sutherland at the Battle of Auldicharish (Battle of Strathcarron).
Sir David Ross 7th of Balnagowan	1527	Married Helen, daughter of Keith of Inverugie.
Walter Ross 8th of Balnagowan	1528	Married Marrion, daughter of Sir John Grant of Freuchie.
Alexander Ross 9th of Balnagowan	1592	Married Janet Sinclair, daughter of the 3rd Earl of Caithness.
George Ross 10th of Balnagowan	1615	Married Marrion, daughter of Sir John Campbell of Calder. Later married Isobel, daughter of Angus MacKintosh of Torcastle.
David Ross 11th of Balnagowan	1632	Married Mary, daughter of Alexander Earl of Sutherland.
David Ross 12th of Balnagowan	1653	Married Mary, daughter of the 7th Lord Fraser of Lovat. Fought at the Battle of Worcester in 1651 where he led some of the clan, captured and imprisoned at the Tower of London, said to have died there and been buried in Westminster.
David Ross 13th of Balnagowan	1711	Last of Balnagowan O' Beolain line. Married Anne, daughter of the 4th Earl of Moray. Left his estates to a stranger in blood: Charles Ross.
Lt-General Charles Ross, 14th of Balnagowan	1732	Second son of George Ross, 11th Lord Ross of Hawkhead. Also inherited the estates of Balnagowan.
Col. Charles Ross, 15th of Balnagowan.	1745	Second son of George Ross, 13th Lord Ross of Hawkhead. Killed in 1745 leading some members of the clan at the Battle of Fontenoy 30 April 1745.
George, 13th Lord Ross of Hawkhead and 16th of Balnagowan.	1754	Of the Hawkhead line of Ross.
William, 14th Lord Ross of Hawkhead and 17th of Balnagowan.	1754	Of the Hawkhead line of Ross.
Grizel Lockhart Ross, daughter of William Ross, 12th Lord Ross of Hawkhead	1755	On expiry of the male Ross of Hawkhead line the estates of Balnagowan passed to James Lockhart of Carstairs whose grandfather had married Grizel the daughter of William Ross, 12th Lord Ross. Sir James assumed the name Lockhart-Ross.
Sir William Lockhart-Ross	1758	First of Lockhart line.
Sir James Lockhart-Ross	1760	Second of Lockhart line.
Sir George Lockhart-Ross	1778	Third of Lockhart line.
Admiral Sir John Lockhart-Ross	1790	Fourth of Lockhart line.
Lt. General Sir Charles Lockhart-Ross of Balnagown	1814	Fifth of Lockhart line.
Sir Charles William Augustus Lockhart-Ross of Balnagown	1893	Sixth and last of Lockhart-Ross line.
Ethel Frances Sarah Williamson Ross	1957	The Rosses of Pitcalnie. The Chiefship of Balnagowan then passed to a line who were direct descendants of Nicholas Ross who was the second son of Chief Alexander Ross 9th of Balnagowan who died in 1592. (The Chiefship back then had gone to Alexander's first son George 10th of Balnagowan who died in 1615)
Rosa Williamson Ross	1968	The Rosses of Pitcalnie.
David Campbell Ross	2024	The Chiefship passed to another line of Rosses. The Rosses of Shandwick are direct descendants of William Ross who was killed in battle in 1486. William was the grandson of Hugh Ross the 4th of Balnagowan and the brother of Alexander Ross 6th of Balnagowan.
Fiona Campbell Ross	Current	Following the death of her father David Campbell Ross of Ross and Balnagowan in 2024, Fiona Campbell Ross of Ross and Balnagowan has been recognised as Chief of Clan Ross by the Lord Lyon King of Arms in April 2025.
