= Ninian Ross, 3rd Lord Ross =

Scottish nobleman

Ninian Ross, 3rd Lord Ross of Halkhead (died February 1556), was a Scottish nobleman.

== Origins ==
Ross was the son and heir of John Ross, 2nd Lord Ross and Christian, the daughter of Sir Archibald Edmonstone. The Rosses of Halkhead, or Hawkhead, in Renfrewshire, were a Lowland family, not apparently related to the Earls of Ross or the Highland family of Ross of Balnagown.

== Career ==
Following the death of his father at the Battle of Flodden, Ross had by 1514 obtained sasines of his father's lands in Melville, Renfrew and Tarbert. He attended the parliaments of James V of Scotland frequently over the next 25 years. On 30 June 1534 he ratified Scotland's peace treaty with England. He died in February 1556.

== Family ==
Ross married four times:

- Janet Stewart, daughter of John Stewart, 3rd Earl of Lennox.
- (contract 12 December 1523) Elizabeth, youngest daughter of William Ruthven, 1st Lord Ruthven, and widow of William, 5th Earl of Erroll
- (contract 9 December 1529) Elizabeth Stewart, daughter of the Earl of Atholl and widow of the Earl of Lennox
- Janet Montgomery

Lord Ross had issue:

- Robert, Master of Ross, who was killed in 1547 at the Battle of Pinkie. He married Agnes Moncrieff and left a daughter, Elizabeth Ross. She was a lady in waiting to Mary, Queen of Scots, and married on 10 May 1562, John Fleming, 5th Lord Fleming. Mary paid for the wedding banquet. The celebrations were held in Holyrood park at the side of the loch and there were "great triumphs", shows and masques involving a staged sea-battle or naumachia. The ambassador from Sweden attended.
- James Ross, 4th Lord Ross
- Hugh Ross
- William Ross
- Christian Ross, who married first (1543) John Mure of Caldwell, secondly (5 November 1552) Nicholas Ramsay of Dalhousie and thirdly (before 8 July 1555) John Weir, and died before February 1557.
- (a natural son) John Ross of Tartraven, ancestor of the family of Ross of Kirkland.

Peerage of Scotland
Preceded by John Ross	Lord Ross; 1513–1556	Succeeded by James Ross
