= Robert Ross, 5th Lord Ross =

Scottish nobleman

Robert Ross, 5th Lord Ross of Halkhead (1563 – October 1595) was a Scottish nobleman.

== Origins ==
Ross was the eldest son and heir of James Ross, 4th Lord Ross, who died on 2 April 1581, by Jean, daughter of Robert, 3rd Lord Sempill. The Rosses of Halkhead, or Hawkhead, in Renfrewshire, were a Lowland family, not apparently related to the Earls of Ross or the Highland family of Ross of Balnagown.

Ross had sasines of the lands of Halkhead on 30 October 1581, of Broomlands and "Roisholm" on 15 May 1583 and of Tarbert, in Ayrshire, in 1590.

== Career ==
On 19 May 1584 Ross attended the parliament in Edinburgh at which the Earl of Angus, the Earl of Mar and Lord Glamis were found guilty of treason.

Towards the end of his life, Ross fell out with James VI. On 29 May 1591, James VI wrote to Robert Mure of Caldwell, requesting him to use his influence with Ross to make him pay rents due to the royal servants John Stewart of Rosland and William Stewart for the lands of Foulbar. Mure's good offices proved insufficient and, on 30 September 1591, James wrote to Lord Hamilton to inform him that Ross remained in rebellion and to direct him to take steps to bring Ross to justice.

Ross died in October 1595. The English diplomat George Nicholson wrote that he was "dead upon the hurt of the breach of his gun." Administration of his estates was given to Walter Stewart, 1st Lord Blantyre.

== Family ==
Ross married Jean Hamilton, daughter of Gavin Hamilton of Raploch. She survived him and married Sir Robert Melville before dying in May 1631. Ross had two legitimate sons - James Ross, 6th Lord Ross and Robert (died March 1617) - as well as an illegitimate daughter, Elspeth (who married James Miller, an advocate).

Peerage of Scotland
Preceded by James Ross	Lord Ross; 1581–1595	Succeeded by James Ross
