= James Ross, 4th Lord Ross =

Scottish nobleman (died 1581)

James Ross, 4th Lord Ross of Halkhead (died 2 April 1581) was a Scottish nobleman and an adherent to the cause of Mary, Queen of Scots.

== Origins ==
Ross was the second, but oldest surviving son of Ninian Ross, 3rd Lord Ross, who died in February 1555/6. The Rosses of Halkhead, or Hawkhead, in Renfrewshire, were a Lowland family, not apparently related to the Earls of Ross or the Highland family of Ross of Balnagown.

== Career ==
Having promised on 5 September 1565 to faithfully serve Queen Mary and Lord Darnley against the rebellious lords, Lord Ross was ordered on 10 October 1565 to accompany the vanguard of the Queen's army in pursuit of the rebels. The conflict is known as the Chaseabout Raid. Mary and David Rizzio were frequent visitors to Ross's estate at Melville near Dalkeith, though there were later suggestions by Lord Ruthven that Rizzio and Ross fell out when Ross refused to give Rizzio the lordship of Melville.

On 19 April 1567, Ross was one of the 22 lords who signed the Ainslie Tavern Bond to indicate their agreement to the marriage between Bothwell and the Queen. On 8 May 1568, he signed a bond for defence of the Queen at Hamilton. He took part in the Battle of Langside on 13 May 1568, but was captured by the Regent Moray. Ten years later, in 1578, he appeared in a list of nobles still adhering to the Queen.

As a Roman Catholic, he was excommunicated on 20 June 1573, alongside his brother-in-law, Lord Sempill.

He died on 2 April 1581.

== Family ==
Ross married Jean, daughter of Robert Sempill, 3rd Lord Sempill (a descendant of Robert II of Scotland, Robert III of Scotland) and also Sir John Ross, 1st Lord of Ross of Halkhead) who died 28 February 1593. By her, he had issue:

- Robert Ross, 5th Lord Ross
- William Ross, 10th Lord Ross
- Elizabeth, who married (contract 20 November 1582) Allan Lockhart, one of the Lockharts of Cleghorn. This couple were ancestors of Bill Clinton, 42nd President of the U.S.A., and astronaut Paul Lockhart, a direct descendent of Captain James Lockhart (grandson of Allan Lockhart) who sailed to Jamestown in 1677 as a member of the Royal Colonial Army, and remained in the American colonies.
- Jean, who married first Sir James Sandilands of Calder and secondly (contract 29 July 1580) Henry Stewart of Craigiehall
- Dorothy, who married Alexander Cunningham of Aiket
- Alison, or Alice, or Helen, who married Sir John Melville of Carnbee
- Grisel, who married (contract 18 March 1589/90) Sir Archibald Stirling of Keir and died on 3 October 1618.

Peerage of Scotland
Preceded by Ninian Ross	Lord Ross; 1556–1581	Succeeded by Robert Ross
