= John Ross, 1st Lord Ross =

John Ross, 1st Lord Ross of Halkhead (died 1501) was a Scottish nobleman.

== Origins ==
The Rosses of Halkhead were not, so far as is known, related to the Earls of Ross or the Highland family of Ross of Balnagown. Robert II of Scotland (while still Earl of Strathearn) granted Halkhead, or Hawkhead, in Renfrewshire, to John Ross in 1367. The subject of this article was son and heir of his direct descendant, Sir John Ross, heritable Constable of Renfrew Castle.

== Career ==
On 25 February 1448/9, in the presence of James II at Stirling, Ross was one of three Scottish champions in a tournament against three Burgundians, in which he is said to have fought Simon De Lalain to a draw. Ross was knighted in 1450 and on 17 January 1450/1 had a charter of the lands of Tarbert in Ayrshire and Auchinbak in Renfrewshire. Between 1463 and 1468 he was Keeper of Blackness Castle. He was appointed Sheriff of Linlithgow before 1468 and again (for life) on 9 March 1472/3. On 24 August 1473 he was granted a safe-conduct in his capacity as Ambassador to England and by 31 May 1499 had been created Lord Ross of Halkhead. He died between 12 December 1500 and 16 October 1501.

== Family ==
Ross married first Marjory, daughter of John Mure of Caldwell, and secondly (after 1491) Marion, daughter of Sir William Baillie of Lamington and widow of Lord Somerville. His second marriage ended in divorce. By his first wife, he had a son and heir, Robert, who married Agnes Melville (daughter of Thomas Melville of Melville) but pre-deceased him. Lord Ross was accordingly succeeded by his grandson, John. Lord Ross also had a daughter, Giles, who married (contract dated 3 March 1480) James, son of Sir John Auchinleck.

Peerage of Scotland
New creation	Lord Ross; 1499–1501	Succeeded by John Ross
