= William Ross, 10th Lord Ross =

Scottish nobleman

William Ross, 10th Lord Ross of Halkhead (died 1656), was a Scottish nobleman.

== Origins ==
Ross was the second son of James Ross, 4th Lord Ross, who died on 2 April 1581, by Jean, daughter of Robert, 3rd Lord Sempill. He succeeded to the peerage following the death of his great-nephew William in August 1648, to whom he was served heir on 20 March 1649. After his succession, he became embroiled in a legal dispute with the Countess of Eglinton (the widow of his nephew James) in relation to the charter-chest of the House of Ross, which she apparently declined to produce.

The Rosses of Halkhead, or Hawkhead, in Renfrewshire, were a Lowland family, not apparently related to the Earls of Ross or the Highland family of Ross of Balnagown.

== Career ==
Ross was knighted by Charles I on 12 July 1633. Prior to his succession to the peerage, he was known generally as William Ross of Torphin, or Sir William Ross of Muriston, or Newriston.

In 1643 and 1644 he was on the Committee of War for Renfrewshire and was appointed Sheriff of Renfrewshire in 1646. He was on the Committee of War and Colonel for Ayrshire and Renfrewshire in 1648 and 1649. In 1649 he was also a commissioner for the plantation of kirks (intended to provide for the regular and permanent endowment of the ministers of the Church of Scotland).

In 1654, Ross was fined £3,000 under Cromwell's "Act of Grace", but the fine was subsequently reduced to £750.

== Family ==
Ross married first Elizabeth, the daughter of Sir Patrick Houston of Houston and widow of John Whitefoord. With her he received first a charter (11 June 1624) and then a sasine (25 June 1628) of Muriston. He married secondly Margaret, the eldest daughter of Sir James Forrester of Torwoodhead. By her he had at least one son, George, by whom he was succeeded on his death in 1656.

Peerage of Scotland
Preceded by Robert Ross	Lord Ross; 1648–1656	Succeeded by George Ross
