= James Ross, 6th Lord Ross =

Scottish nobleman

James Ross, 6th Lord Ross of Halkhead (died 17 December 1633) was a Scottish nobleman.

== Origins ==
Ross was the eldest son and heir of Robert Ross, 5th Lord Ross, who died in October 1595, by Jean, daughter of Gavin Hamilton of Raploch. The Rosses of Halkhead, or Hawkhead, in Renfrewshire, were a Lowland family, not apparently related to the Earls of Ross or the Highland family of Ross of Balnagown.

== Estates ==
Ross was retoured as his grandfather's heir on 13 February 1600 and as his father's heir on 13 September 1615 in Tartrevan, Watterstoun, Morningsydis and Prestoun.

He had charters of Easter Stanley, Renfrewshire, on 16 July 1631, Corsbar and Inglistoun on 3 November 1632, and of Craig and Balone on 16 January 1632 or 1633.

== Career ==
Ross attended Parliament on 22 June 1617 and voted against the ratification of the Five Articles of Perth on 4 August 1621. He was present at the Conventions of 27 October 1625 and 28 July 1630 and attended a meeting of the Privy Council on 20 April 1626.

He died on 17 December 1633 (having made his will on 13 October of that year) and was buried at Renfrew.

== Family ==
Ross married in 1614/5 Margaret, daughter of Walter Scott, 1st Lord Scott of Buccleuch. She survived him and married secondly Alexander Montgomerie, 6th Earl of Eglinton, before dying on 5 October 1651 at Hull. Their children included:

- James Ross, 7th Lord Ross
- William Ross, 8th Lord Ross
- Robert Ross, 9th Lord Ross
- Margaret (born 19 December 1615; died 10 March 1633; buried 27 March 1633), who married Sir George Stirling of Keir in December 1630. Her clothes in 1633 included; a gown of Florence flowered orange and black satin with gold lace, a gown orange velvet with silver lace, and petticoats of green and Milan satin.
- Mary, who married John Hepburn of Waughton
- Jean, who married Sir Robert Innes of Innes

Peerage of Scotland
Preceded by Robert Ross	Lord Ross; 1595–1633	Succeeded by James Ross
