= James Ross, 7th Lord Ross =

Scottish nobleman

James Ross, 7th Lord Ross of Halkhead (died March 1636) was a Scottish nobleman.

== Origins ==
Ross was the eldest son and heir of James Ross, 6th Lord Ross, who died on 17 December 1633, by Margaret, daughter of Walter Scott, 1st Lord Scott of Buccleuch. The Rosses of Halkhead, or Hawkhead, in Renfrewshire, were a Lowland family, not apparently related to the Earls of Ross or the Highland family of Ross of Balnagown.

== Estates ==
Ross was served heir of his father in the lordship and barony of Melville and in Broomlands and other lands on 18 September 1634. He had charters of Halkhead, Craig and Balgone on 25 January 1636, and also of Easter Stanley in Renfrewshire.

== Death ==
Ross died unmarried in March 1636 at Jaffa and was succeeded by his brother, William.

Peerage of Scotland
Preceded by James Ross	Lord Ross; 1633–1636	Succeeded by William Ross
