= Logie Easter =

Civil parish in Easter Ross, Scotland

Coordinates: 57.7491°N 4.0713°W

Logie Easter: Scottish Gaelic: Lagaidh
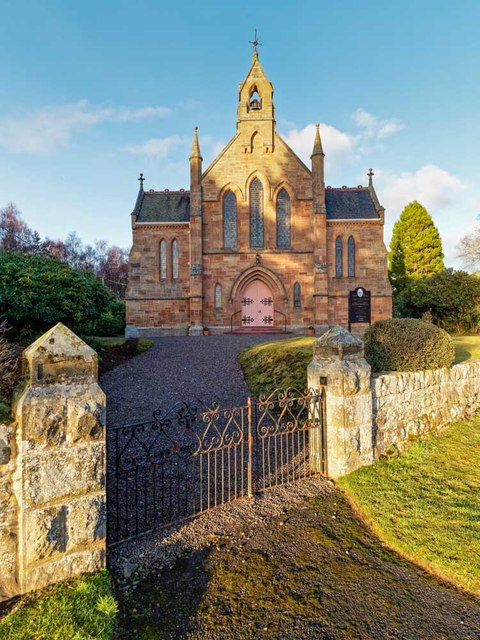
- Logie Easter Parish Church

- Location within the Ross and Cromarty area
- Area: 15.7 sq mi (41 km^{2})
- Population: 658 (2011)
  - Density: 42/sq mi (16/km^{2})
- Language: English
- OS grid reference: NH768749
- Civil parish: Logie Easter
- Council area: Highland
- Lieutenancy area: Ross and Cromarty
- Country: Scotland
- Sovereign state: United Kingdom
- Post town: Tain
- Postcode district: IV18 0
- Dialling code: 01862
- Police: Scotland
- Fire: Scottish
- Ambulance: Scottish
- UK Parliament: Caithness, Sutherland and Easter Ross (UK Parliament constituency)
- Scottish Parliament: Caithness, Sutherland and Ross (Scottish Parliament constituency)

Logie Easter is a civil parish in Easter Ross in the Highland area of Scotland. It is bordered by the parishes of Edderton and Tain in the north and Fearn and Nigg in the east. The Balnagown River on the south forms the border with Kilmuir Easter. It extends about 7.5 miles (12.1 kilometres) from east to west.

The name Logie is Gaelic for 'hollow' and probably the parish took this name because a previous parish church was sited at Marybank in a hollow or dell by the River Balnagown.

The parish is mainly rural with several areas of woodland. In the west of the parish, above Scotsburn, lies Scotsburn Wood, which contains a number of cairns, which were almost certainly created to mark an ancient battle. The land gently rises to 208 feet (63 metres) near Logie Hill in the eastern part of the parish, but further west near Lamington rises to 351 feet (107 metres). The highest part is along the western border, where Cnoc an t-Sabhail reaches 1,242 feet (379 metres).

At the 2011 census, the population of the civil parish was 658. 2.8% had some knowledge of Gaelic. A hundred years before, in 1911, 24.0% were Gaelic speaking (and 52.7% in 1881). The area of the parish is 10,018 acres (15.7 mi^{2}; 40.5 km^{2}).

The parish was originally divided between the counties of Ross-shire and Cromartyshire, but these counties were united in 1889. 1,807 acres (2.8 mi^{2}; 7.3 km^{2}) were in Cromartyshire, part of an enclave around Tarbat House spanning Kilmuir Easter and Logie Easter. The parish council was formed in 1895 with 7 elected members. This was replaced by Invergordon District Council in 1930, which was made up of the parishes of Rosskeen, Kilmuir Easter and Logie Easter. The District Council had 7 members, 3 of whom were the County Councillors for area and 4 elected to the District Council from the parishes (Rosskeen had 2 members and the others 1 each). Since 1976, this has been superseded by the Kilmuir and Logie Easter Community Council, which covers the parish of Kilmuir Easter as well as Logie Easter. The community council has 8 members.

Logie Easter is in the ward of Tain and Easter Ross of Highland council.

The Far North Line railway route passes through the eastern part of the parish, but Nigg railway station within the parish is closed. The nearest open stations are at Tain and Invergordon.

There is now a combined Church of Scotland parish for Kilmuir & Logie Easter which uses both the Kilmuir Easter and Logie Easter church buildings.

The first church after the Scottish Reformation was built at Marybank (in a hollow) and was replaced by another building in the same place in 1767. In 1818 this was replaced by a church on Chapel Hill, one mile (1.6 km) north-east of Kildary. The United Free Church building was opened nearby in 1905 and, after the re-union with the Church of Scotland, it became the parish's main place of worship in 1948. The previous building was demolished in 1988. The parish is first recorded (other than minimal references) in 1497 when King James IV presented a new vicar for "Logy" (identified with Logie Easter) in the diocese of Ross.

== Settlements ==
- Arabella, Highland
- Kildary
- Lamington, Highland
- Logie Hill
- Newfield, Highland
- Scotsburn, Highland
