= George Ross, 13th Lord Ross =

Scottish nobleman (1681–1754)

George Ross, 13th Lord Ross of Halkhead (8 April 1681 – 17 June 1754), was a Scottish nobleman.

== Origins ==
Ross was the eldest son and heir of William Ross, 12th Lord Ross, who died in 1738, by Agnes, daughter and heiress of Sir John Wilkie of Fouldean. The Rosses of Halkhead, or Hawkhead, in Renfrewshire, were a Lowland family, not apparently related to the Earls of Ross or the Highland family of Ross of Balnagown.

== Career ==
Ross was appointed a Commissioner of Supply for Renfrewshire on 19 June 1702, and for Edinburgh and Renfrewshire on 5 August 1704. He was elected Lord Rector of Glasgow University in 1727 and 1728 and was appointed Governor of Edinburgh Castle in June 1739. He was appointed a Commissioner of Customs and Salt on 13 February 1744, 29 October 1746 and 20 July 1751.

On the death of his son Charles in 1745, he succeeded to the estate of Balnagown. He himself died at Ross House, Edinburgh, on 17 June 1754.

== Family ==
Ross married in about 1711 Elizabeth, the third daughter of William Kerr, 2nd Marquess of Lothian. She died on 22 May 1758. Their children included:

- William Ross, 14th Lord Ross (c1720 – 19 August 1754)
- Charles Ross (9 February 1721 – 30 April 1745), who inherited the estate of Balnagown from his uncle in 1732 and was killed at the Battle of Fontenoy
- George Ross (born 7 September 1722), who predeceased his father
- Jane Ross (10 December 1719 – 19 August 1777), who married (28 July 1755) John Mackye of Polgowan and inherited the estates of Halkhead on the death of her elder brother, William
- Elizabeth Ross (16 April 1725 – 9 October 1791), who married (7 July 1755) John Boyle, 3rd Earl of Glasgow and succeeded to the estates of Halkhead on the death of her elder sister, Jane
- Mary Ross (1730-22 October 1762), who was one of the last persons in Scotland supposed to be 'possessed' of an evil spirit and who died unmarried
- Margaret (born 1731), who died unmarried

Military offices
Preceded by The Earl of Selkirk	Governor of Edinburgh Castle; 1738	Succeeded by James Campbell
Peerage of Scotland
Preceded by William Ross	Lord Ross; 1738–1754	Succeeded by William Ross
