= John Ross, 2nd Lord Ross =

Scottish nobleman

John Ross, 2nd Lord Ross of Halkhead (died 1513) was a Scottish nobleman.

== Origins ==
Ross was the son and heir of Robert Ross (the son of John Ross, 1st Lord Ross) and Agnes Melville, daughter and heiress of Thomas Melville of Melville. The Rosses of Halkhead, or Hawkhead, in Renfrewshire, were a Lowland family, not apparently related to the Earls of Ross or the Highland family of Ross of Balnagown.

== Career ==
Ross succeeded to the peerage in 1501 on the death of his grandfather, whom his father had pre-deceased. He had earlier been retoured heir of his mother in the barony of Melville on 16 May 1496. Over the years that followed, he obtained a number of charters and sasines in respect of extensive estates in and around Renfrewshire and Linlithgow.

It is recorded that James IV visited Ross at Halkhead on 1 April 1506 (on which occasion the King treated Ross's masons to a drink) and that he was again in the King's company (playing games and shooting the culverin) in February and March 1507/8.

He was killed at the Battle of Flodden on 9 September 1513.

== Family ==
Ross married (before 27 September 1490) Christian Edmonstone, daughter of Sir Archibald Edmonstone of Duntreath. She survived him and lived until May 1551. Lord Ross had at least four recorded children:

- Ninian Ross, 3rd Lord Ross
- Andrew Ross of Wardlaw
- Thomas Ross
- Helen Ross, who married John Blair of that Ilk.

Peerage of Scotland
Preceded by John Ross	Lord Ross; 1501–1513	Succeeded by Ninian Ross
