= George Ross, 11th Lord Ross =

Scottish nobleman and soldier

Lord Ross
- Born: George Ross
- Died: April 1682
- Spouses: Grizel Cochrane; Jean Ramsay
- Father: William Ross, 10th Lord Ross

George Ross, 11th Lord Ross of Halkhead (died April 1682), was a Scottish nobleman and soldier.

== Origins ==
Ross was the son and heir of William Ross, 10th Lord Ross, who died in 1656, by Margaret, daughter of Sir James Forrester of Torwoodhead. The Rosses of Halkhead, or Hawkhead, in Renfrewshire, were a Lowland family, not apparently related to the Earls of Ross or the Highland family of Ross of Balnagown.

== Career ==
Ross was present at the first Parliament of Charles II, which passed the Rescissory Act 1661 (banning Presbyterianism), and thereafter attended Parliament regularly.

He was appointed a Justice of the Peace for Ayrshire and Renfrewshire on 9 October 1663, a Commissioner for the Collection of the Excise on 23 January 1667 and a Commissioner of Militia for Ayrshire and Renfrewshire on 3 September 1668.

In 1674, together with the Marquess of Douglas and the Earl of Erroll, Ross raised three troops of horse, which were subsequently disbanded in 1676. On 1 November 1677, he was lieutenant-colonel of the Scots Guards. He was in command at Glasgow during the Battle of Drumclog on 1 June 1679, when Claverhouse was defeated by the Covenanters. He provided support to him in the aftermath of that battle. Shortly afterwards, he succeeded in beating off a determined attack by the Covenanters on Glasgow itself.

He died at Halkhead in April 1682.

== Family ==
Lord Ross married first (contract dated October 1653) Grizel Cochrane, daughter of William Cochrane (later the first Earl of Dundonald) and Euphemia Cochrane, Countess of Dundonald. By her he had:

- William, who succeeded him, and
- Grizel (who married Sir Alexander Gilmour of Craigmillar and died on 10 June 1732).

Lord Ross's first wife died in 1665 and he soon after married, secondly, Jean Ramsay, eldest daughter of George Ramsay, 2nd Earl of Dalhousie. She survived him and married Robert Makgill, 2nd Viscount of Oxfuird, before dying in November 1696. By her, Lord Ross had:

- Charles Ross of Balnagown, who inherited that estate on the death of David Ross of Balnagown (although no relation of his)
- Anna
- Jean, who married William Ramsay, 6th Earl of Dalhousie
- Euphame
- Margaret

Peerage of Scotland
Preceded by William Ross	Lord Ross; 1656–1682	Succeeded by William Ross
