= William Ross, 8th Lord Ross =

Scottish nobleman

William Ross, 8th Lord Ross of Halkhead (died August 1640) was a Scottish nobleman.

== Origins ==
Ross was the second son of James Ross, 6th Lord Ross, who died on 17 December 1633, by Margaret, daughter of Walter Scott, 1st Lord Scott of Buccleuch. He succeeded to the peerage on the death of his elder brother James, at Jaffa in March 1636.

The Rosses of Halkhead, or Hawkhead, in Renfrewshire, were a Lowland family, not apparently related to the Earls of Ross or the Highland family of Ross of Balnagown.

== Estates ==
Ross was served heir of his brother in Broomlands and other lands, and also (on 8 September 1636) in Melville, Stanehouse and other lands.

== Death ==
Ross died unmarried in August 1640 and was succeeded by his younger brother, Robert.

Peerage of Scotland
Preceded by James Ross	Lord Ross; 1636–1640	Succeeded by Robert Ross
