= Sir Charles Lockhart-Ross, 7th Baronet =

British Baronet (1763–1814)

Sir Charles Lockhart-Ross, 7th Baronet (c. 1763 – 8 February 1814) was a Scottish landowner, politician, and officer in the British Army.

Sir Charles was the oldest son of Sir John Lockhart Ross, 6th Baronet, of Balnagown by Elizabeth Baillie, the daughter of Robert Dundas of Edinburgh. He succeeded his father as 7th Baronet on 9 June 1790.

He joined the army in 1780 as a cornet in the 7th Dragoons, rising to the rank of Lieutenant-General by 1805. Towards the end of his military career he was given the colonelcy of the 86th (The Leinster) Regiment of Foot in 1806, transferring in 1810 as colonel to be colonel of the 37th (North Hampshire) Regiment of Foot, a post he held until his death in 1814.

Lockhart-Ross was also a wealthy landowner whose mother had bequeathed him large estates in both Lanarkshire and Ross-shire, the latter giving him control of the Royal Burgh of Tain.He was elected at a by-election in June 1786 as the Member of Parliament for the Tain district of Burghs and was re-elected in the 1790. In 1796 he was returned for Ross-shire, which returned him again in 1802. At the 1806 election he was returned for the Linlithgow Burghs, where he was defeated in 1807.

He married twice, first in 1788 to Matilda Theresa, daughter of James Lockhart-Wishart of Lanarkshire, a Count of Holy Roman Empire and officer in the Austrian army. After her death in 1791 he married again in 1799, to Lady Mary Rebecca Fitzgerald, daughter of the 2nd Duke of Leinster. He had a son, who died young, and a daughter in the first marriage and two sons and five daughters in the second. He was succeeded by his son, Sir Charles William Frederick Augustus Lockhart-Ross, 8th Baronet.

Military offices
Preceded by Sir Hew Whitefoord Dalrymple	Colonel of the 37th (North Hampshire) Regiment of Foot; 1810–1814	Succeeded by Sir Charles Green, Bt
Preceded by Sir James Henry Craig	Colonel of the 86th (The Leinster) Regiment of Foot; 1806–1810	Succeeded by Francis Needham, 1st Earl of Kilmorey
Parliament of Great Britain
Preceded by George Ross	Member of Parliament for Tain Burghs; 1786–1796	Succeeded by William Dundas
Preceded by Francis Humberston Mackenzie	Member of Parliament for Ross-shire; 1796–1800	Succeeded by Parliament of the United Kingdom
Parliament of the United Kingdom
Preceded by Parliament of Great Britain	Member of Parliament for Ross-shire; 1801–1806	Succeeded by Alexander Mackenzie-Fraser
Preceded by William Dickson	Member of Parliament for Linlithgow Burghs; 1806–1807	Succeeded by William Maxwell
Baronetage of Nova Scotia
Preceded by John Lockhart-Ross	Baronet (of Carstairs); 1790–1814	Succeeded by Charles William Frederick Augustus Lockhart-Ross
