= Amatnatua =

Coordinates: 57.87°N 04.58°W

- Location within the Highland council area
- OS grid reference: NH4790
- Council area: Highland
- Country: Scotland
- Sovereign state: United Kingdom
- Police: Scotland
- Fire: Scottish
- Ambulance: Scottish

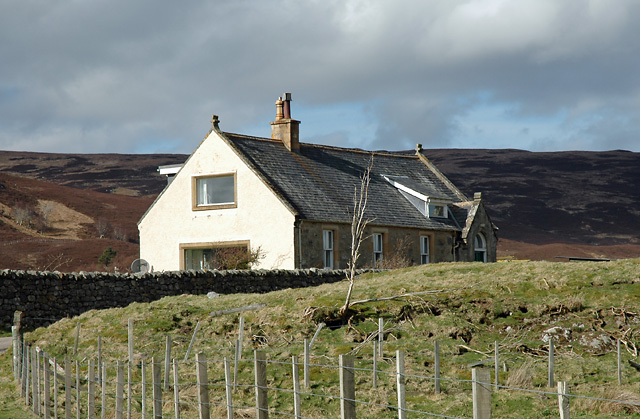
A converted church in Amatnatua

Amatnatua (Scottish Gaelic: Àmait na Tuath) is a hamlet in Highland, Scotland.

It lies within the civil parish of Kincardine and Community council or Ardgay and District.

Amatnatua and Dounie were in the county of Cromartyshire, before its amalgamation with Ross-shire in 1889.
