= Margaret Fraser Barbour =

- Born: March 24, 1823; Perth
- Died: February 5, 1892; Edinburgh
- Occupation: Writer
- Spouse: George Freeland Barbour
- Children: 5, including A. H. Freeland Barbour

Margaret Fraser Barbour (March 24, 1823 – February 5, 1892) was a Scottish religious children's writer and poet.

Margaret Fraser Sandeman was born on March 24, 1823 in Perth, Scotland, the daughter of Glas Sandeman, a descendant of the Sandeman family who promoted the Glasites, and Margaret Fraser Stewart Sandeman, a Protestant religious poet. She married George Freeland Barbour of Bonskeid and Gryffe Castle in 1845 and they had five children, including gynecologist A. H. Freeland Barbour.

Sandeman wrote a number of religiously-oriented works for children, such as The Way Home (1856) and its sequel, The Irish Orphan in a Scottish Home (1857), which Rolf Loeber described as "a Protestant religious tract in story form." Her The Soul-Gatherer is a mix of religious poetry and prose. She also wrote a memoir of her mother A Memoir of Mrs. Stewart Sandeman by her Daughter (1883).

Margaret Fraser Barbour died on 5 February 1892 in Edinburgh.

== Bibliography ==
1. The Way Home: A Religious Manual for the Young. 1 vol. Edinburgh: John Greig and Son, 1856.
2. The Child of the Kingdom, J. Nisbet & Co., London, 1862.
3. The Soul-Gatherer. 1 vol. London: James Nisbet, 1864.
4. The Irish Orphan in a Scottish Home. 1 vol. Edinburgh: Nelson and Sons, 1866.
5. Three Burdens Laid Down, Morgan & Scott, London, 1874.
6. The Bottles Broken, and How the Mischief was Remedied. London, 1875.
7. A Memoir of Mrs Stewart Sandeman by her Daughter, J. Nisbet & Co., London, 1883
