= William Ross, 14th Lord Ross =

Scottish nobleman

William Ross, 14th Lord Ross of Halkhead (c.1720-19 August 1754), was a Scottish nobleman.

== Origins ==
Ross was the eldest son and heir of George Ross, 13th Lord Ross, who died on 17 June 1754, by Elizabeth, third daughter of William Kerr, 2nd Marquess of Lothian. The Rosses of Halkhead, or Hawkhead, in Renfrewshire, were a Lowland family, not apparently related to the Earls of Ross or the Highland family of Ross of Balnagown.

== Career ==
Ross was an officer in the Hanoverian army commanded by John Campbell, 4th Earl of Loudoun in Inverness in 1745 and was subsequently a Commissioner of Customs.

== Death and posterity ==
Ross survived his father by only two months, dying at Mount Teviot, the seat of his uncle, the Marquess of Lothian, on 19 August 1754. He was unmarried and the title of Lord Ross fell extinct at his death. His estate of Balnagown was inherited by his cousin Sir James Ross Lockhart, while his more ancient ancestral estates at Halkhead, together with his other property, devolved upon his sisters, eventually passing into the family of the Earls of Glasgow.

Peerage of Scotland
Preceded by George Ross	Lord Ross; 1754	Extinct
