= Clan Anderson =

Scottish clan

- Mac Ghille Aindrais or Gilleaindreas
- Crest: An oak tree, Proper
- Motto: Stand Sure

Profile
- Region: unknown
- District: Badenoch
- Plant badge: An Oak Tree
- Clan Anderson no longer has a chief, and is an armigerous clan
Septs of Clan Anderson
Anderson, Andrew, Gillanders, M(a)cAndrew, Andrews, M'Anderson
Clan branches
Anderson of Ardbrake
Anderson of Dowhill
Anderson of Kinneddar
Anderson of Candacraig
Allied clans
Chattan Confederation
Clan Mackintosh

Clan Anderson is a Lowlands Scottish clan. As the clan does not currently have a chief recognised by the Court of the Lord Lyon, it is therefore considered an armigerous clan. Variations of the surname are however considered septs of several other clans of the Scottish Highlands: The surname MacAndrews is considered a sept of the Clan Mackintosh and the wider Clan Chattan Confederation. Clan Anderson is also associated with the Clan MacDonell of Glengarry. The surnames Andrew and Andrews are also considered septs of the Clan Ross.

== History ==
=== Origins ===
As Saint Andrew is the patron saint of Scotland the surname Anderson, which means Son of Andrew is commonly found throughout most of the country. The Scottish Gaelic derivation of the name is Gilleaindreas which means servant of Andrew. The Scottish historian, Ian Grimble, states that although arms were granted to an Anderson of that ilk in the sixteenth century, as the name is so widespread no exact place of origin can be established.

=== 16th and 17th centuries ===
The historian George Fraser Black lists Andersons as being burgesses of Peebles as well as in the county of Dumfries. In 1585 John Anderson was a commissioner to Parliament for Cupar. Alexander Anderson was a famous mathematician who was born near Aberdeen and later settled in Paris, where he published works on Algebra and Geometry. Alexander's kinsman, David Anderson of Finshaugh, also a scientist, is renowned for removing a rock that was obstructing the entrance to Aberdeen harbour with the application of science and mechanics. His wife Jean Anderson was a noted philanthropist.

=== 19th and 20th centuries ===
In 1863 William Anderson published his famous biographical history of the people of Scotland, The Scottish Nation, in three volumes. In this book he praised the above-mentioned rock remover, David Anderson, stating that he had been rich enough and generous enough to found and endow a hospital in Aberdeen for the maintenance and education of ten poor orphans, although it was Jean Anderson (and her relatives) who made that gift after he died.

In the 20th century the name is remembered for the famous Anderson shelters, a type of bomb shelter that was designed by John Anderson, 1st Viscount Waverley, during World War II.

== Clan society ==
The Clan Anderson Society is a North American organisation dedicated to preserving the history and heritage of Clan Anderson. It was formed in 1973 and is active across the continent. The current Chieftain is Hope Vere Anderson, Baron of Bannockburn.

The society maintains a clan room and archival display at Wyseby House in Kirtlebridge, Dumfriesshire, Scotland. This facility serves as a hub for the society's activities and preserves important historical records and artifacts related to the clan.

In 2014, the Clan Anderson Society was granted a coat of arms by the Court of the Lord Lyon, the heraldic authority in Scotland. The design of the coat of arms features the clan's motto, "WE STAND SURE". That same year, Dr. Joseph Morrow, the Lord Lyon King of Arms, presented the letters patent for the coat of arms to the society at the Loch Norman Highland Games in North Carolina.

== Cadet branches ==
As the Clan has never been able to proclaim a Chief, there are no cadet branches for this clan. However, the major families have been identified as Anderson of Ardbrake & Westerton (whose crest is used by Andersons as a clansman's crest badge); Anderson of Kinneddar (scion of the Ardbrake line), Anderson of Noth, Anderson of Newbiggin & Kingask, Anderson of Dowhill & Stobcross, Anderson of Linkwood, Anderson of Inchyra & Stonyhill, Seton-Anderson of Mounie, and Anderson of Candacraig.

Arms of Anderson of Ardbrake Anderson of Ardbrake
Arms of Anderson of Bruntstane Anderson of Bruntstane	Arms of Anderson of Bishopmill Anderson of Bishopmill
Arms of Anderson of Candacraig Anderson of Candacraig	Arms of Anderson of Kinneddar Anderson of Kinneddar

== Highland MacAndrews ==
In the Scottish Highlands the surname MacAndrew is considered a sept of the Clan Mackintosh or Chattan Confederation and MacAndrews were also associated with the Clan MacDonell of Glengarry. The surnames Andrew and Andrews are also considered septs of the Highland Clan Ross.

== Clan profile ==
- Motto: "Stand Sure" (Anderson of Ardbrake & Westerton, plus Anderson of Kinneddar)
- Crest: An oak tree Proper (Anderson of Ardbrake & Westerton, plus Anderson of Kinneddar)
- Gaelic Name: Mac Aindrais
- Badge: On a wreath of the liveries, an oak tree Proper within a circlet belt & buckle
- Lands: Aberdeenshire, Banff & Moray
- Origin of Name: "Son of Andrew"
- Tartan: First seen in 1815 when collected by the "Highland Society of London." It has an azure field and it is one of several Scottish tartans woven with seven colours.

== Septs ==
Andrew, Anderson, Andrews, Gillanders, MacAndrew, M'Anderson.

== See also ==
- Clan Gillanders
