= Lord Ross =

Lordship of Parliament in the Peerage of Scotland

The title of Lord Ross was a Lordship of Parliament in the Peerage of Scotland. It was created in 1499 for Sir John Ross, of Halkhead.

The second Lord died at the Battle of Flodden. William Ross, 12th Lord Ross was appointed Lord Lieutenant of Renfrew in 1715. When David Ross of Balnagown was found to have no legitimate heirs, the 12th Lord Ross began a campaign to acquire Balnagown. After Balnagown's death in 1711, William's son Charles became 14th of Balnagown. This family then also became chief's of Clan Ross, though the Rosses of Halkhead were not descended from the ancient Earls of Ross. The title became extinct or dormant on the death of the 14th Lord, 19 August 1754.

Elizabeth, daughter of the 13th Lord, married John Boyle, 3rd Earl of Glasgow. In 1815 their son George Boyle, 4th Earl of Glasgow was created Baron Ross, of Hawkhead, in the Peerage of the United Kingdom, which title became extinct in 1890 on the death of his son George Boyle, 6th Earl of Glasgow. Grizel, another daughter of the 13th Lord, married Sir James Lockhart, 2nd Baronet of Carstairs, and their descendants succeeded to Balnagown and as Chiefs of Clan Ross, adopting the name Lockhart-Ross.

== Lords Ross (1499) ==
- John Ross, 1st Lord Ross (d. 1501)
- John Ross, 2nd Lord Ross (d. 1513)
- Ninian Ross, 3rd Lord Ross (d. 1556)
- James Ross, 4th Lord Ross (d. 1581)
- Robert Ross, 5th Lord Ross (d. 1595)
- James Ross, 6th Lord Ross (d. 1633)
- James Ross, 7th Lord Ross (d. 1636)
- William Ross, 8th Lord Ross (d. 1640)
- Robert Ross, 9th Lord Ross (d. 1648)
- William Ross, 10th Lord Ross (d. 1656)
- George Ross, 11th Lord Ross (d. 1682)
- William Ross, 12th Lord Ross (d. 1738)
- George Ross, 13th Lord Ross (d. 1754)
- William Ross, 14th Lord Ross (d. 1754)

== See also ==
- Clan Ross
- Earl of Ross
- Duke of Ross
- Baron Ross
- Lockhart-Ross Baronets

== Sources ==
- Fraser-Mackintosh, Charles (1865). Antiquarian notes, papers regarding families and places in the Highlands. Inverness: Advertisers Office. OL 23509826M.
- Guthrie, William (1767). A General History of Scotland. Vol. 4. Paternoster Row, London: A. Hamilton, Robinson and Roberts.
- Read, Harmon Pumpelly; Reid, Francis Nevile (1908). Rossiana; papers and documents relating to the history and genealogy of the ancient and noble house of Ross, of Ross-shire, Scotland, and its descent form the ancient earls of Ross, together with the descent of the ancient and historic family of Read, from Rede of Trough-end, Reade of Barton Court, Berks, and Read of Delaware. Albany, N.Y.: Press of the Argus co. OCLC 1084513032. OL 23719559M.
- leighrayment.com
