= William Ross, 12th Lord Ross =

Scottish nobleman, soldier and politician

William Ross, 12th Lord Ross (c.1656 – 15 March 1738), was a Scottish nobleman, soldier and politician.

== Origins ==
Ross was born in about 1656. He was the son and heir of George Ross, 11th Lord Ross, who died in 1682, by Grizel, daughter of William Cochrane, 1st Earl of Dundonald. The Rosses of Halkhead, or Hawkhead, in Renfrewshire, were a Lowland family, not apparently related to the Earls of Ross or the Highland family of Ross of Balnagown.

== Military career ==
Ross had commissions as lieutenant (27 September 1678) and captain (4 September 1680) in Lord Home's troop of horse, and as captain (26 December 1682) and major (4 August 1686) in Claverhouse's regiment of horse, the last of which, however, he shortly afterwards resigned. In 1685, he was wounded in an action during the pursuit of the Earl of Argyll.

He appears to have been a personal friend of Claverhouse, having been a witness at his wedding in 1684, and later excused himself from joining the army raised against his old friend and commander by pleading the pressure of his Parliamentary duties.

== Political career ==
In 1689 Ross was present at the first Parliament of King William and was chosen by the Convention of Estates to go to London to give the King an account of their proceedings. He was also appointed as a commissioner to consider the question of union with England. On 18 May 1689, he was appointed a member of the Privy Council.

Disaffected perhaps by the lack of reward for his services, Ross became closely involved with the Earl of Annandale in the dissident "Club" of Sir James Montgomerie of Skelmorlie. However, he recanted and, although sent to the Tower of London in July 1690, was eventually released without prosecution. The disparaging comment of Ross's contemporary, George Lockhart of Carnwath, was that:

Lord Ross was a great persecutor of the Whigs; then he joined them at the Revolution; then plotted to restore King James; then did turn tail, and did accuse all he knew of that party

On 29 February 1704 Ross was appointed Lord High Commissioner to the General Assembly of the Church of Scotland. A later attempt in about 1707 to secure for himself the ancient Earldom of Ross aroused the genealogical indignation of the Earl of Cromartie, who memorably wrote that Ross had no more relation to the old Earls of Ross "than the miller of Carstairs has to the Prince of Parma".

Ross died at Edinburgh on 15 March 1738.

== Family ==
Ross married no fewer than four times:

- Firstly (on 7 February 1679) to Agnes, daughter and heiress of Sir John Wilkie of Fouldean
- Secondly to Margaret, daughter of Philip Wharton, 4th Baron Wharton, widow of Major Dunch and Sir Thomas Sulyarde
- Thirdly to Lady Anne, daughter of John Hay, 2nd Marquess of Tweeddale
- Fourthly (contract 16 June 1731) to Henrietta (d. 16 January 1750), daughter of Sir Francis Scott of Thirlestane

By his first wife, Lord Ross had:

- George Ross, 13th Lord Ross (8 April 1681 – 17 June 1754)
- John Ross (b. 13 July 1687), died young
- Euphame Ross (10 November 1684 – 1729), who married firstly William Boyd, 3rd Earl of Kilmarnock and secondly (after 1717) John Murray
- Mary Ross (b. 18 July 1687), who married (contract 26 June 1710) John Murray, 1st Duke of Atholl
- Grizel Ross (d. November 1749), who married (in or before 1715) Sir James Lockhart of Carstairs

Peerage of Scotland
Preceded by George Ross	Lord Ross; 1682–1738	Succeeded by George Ross
