= Hawkhead Castle =

Castle in Renfrewshire, Scotland

Location
- Coordinates: 55.8321°N 4.3834°W

Site history
- Built: by 15th century

Hawkhead Castle was a castle existing in the 17th century, about 1 mile (1.6 km) east of Paisley, Renfrewshire, Scotland, south of the White Cart River.

It may also be known as Hawkhead House. There are no remains.

== History ==
The Rosses, who built the castle, are said to have held the property from mid-15th century, or earlier from the late 14th century, or even by acquisition from the crown in 1367. It was extended in 1634, and remodelled in 1782. It ceased to be their property in the 19th century. Hawkhead Hospital is on the site.

== Structure ==
The castle had a main keep, with ranges of lower buildings added in 1634 to form a quadrangle. After the remodelling of 1782 it was surrounded by parks and gardens.

- Castles in Great Britain and Ireland
- List of castles in Scotland
