= Arabella, Highland =

Coordinates: 57.756921°N 4.006254°W

Arabella
- Location within the Ross and Cromarty area
- Population: 175
- OS grid reference: NH8075
- Civil parish: Logie Easter
- Council area: Highland
- Country: Scotland
- Sovereign state: United Kingdom
- Police: Scotland
- Fire: Scottish
- Ambulance: Scottish
- UK Parliament: Caithness, Sutherland and Easter Ross
- Scottish Parliament: Caithness, Sutherland and Ross

Arabella (Scottish Gaelic: Am Bog) is a village in the Scottish Highlands.

== History ==
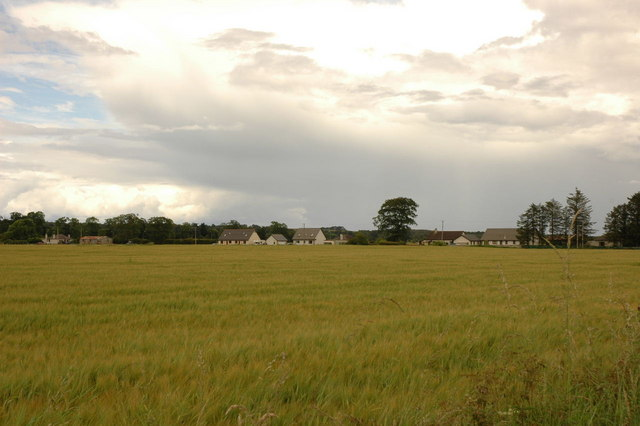
Arabella

Named after the farm which was set aside as small holdings in 1918 for returning servicemen. The original Farm was named after the wife of Hugh Rose, a wealthy land owner who made his fortune in the West Indies in the late 18th century. Arabella Phipps married Hugh Rose in 1799 in London. She lived in Scotland for 7 years and had three children. She died in mysterious circumstances in 1806.

== Landmarks ==
Landmarks include Arabella House, a Listed Building and the one-time residence of John Osler Chattock Hayes.
