= Willie Ross =

Willie Ross may refer to:

- Willie Ross, Baron Ross of Marnock (1911–1988), Scottish Labour Party politician, Secretary of State for Scotland 1964–1970 1974–1976
- Willie Ross (footballer, born 1919) (1919–1990), Scottish football player
- Willie Ross (football manager) (died 1985), Scottish football player and manager (Preston )
- William Ross (Unionist politician) (born 1936), former Ulster Unionist MP for Londonderry 1974–1983 and East Londonderry 1983–2001
- Willie Ross (piper) (1878–1966), Scottish bagpipe player
- Willie Ross (American football) (born 1941), American football player

== See also ==
- William Ross (disambiguation)
