= Gillanders =

Gillanders is a personal name and a surname. It is an Anglicised form of a Gaelic name meaning "the servant of (St) Andrew". The surname can be represented in Scottish Gaelic as MacGill-Andreis (masculine) and NicGill-Andreis (feminine); GillAndrais (m) and GhillAndrais (f); Mac'Ill'Anndrais (m) and Nic'Ill'Anndrais (f); and MacGill-Andreis (m) and NicGill-Andreis (f).

Gillanders may refer to:

== People ==
- Brendan Gillanders (born 1990), Canadian football player
- Bronwyn Gillanders (born 1962), New Zealander ecologist
- Dave Gillanders (born 1939), American swimmer
- John Gillanders (1895–1946), First World War flying ace
- Ken Gillanders, Australian botanist and Order of Australia recipient.

== Other uses ==
- Clan Gillanders, Scottish clan centred in Ross
