= Clan Gillanders =

Scottish clan

Clan Gillanders, also known in Scottish Gaelic as Clann Ghille Ainnriais, is a Scottish clan whose genealogy is preserved in the 15th-century manuscript MS 1467.

== MS 1467 ==
=== Transcriptions and translations ===
Skene's mid-19th century transcription of the Gaelic	Skene's mid-19th century translation into English
Pal ic Tire ic Eogan ic Muiredaigh ic Poil ic Gilleanris ic Martain ic Poil ic Cainig ic Cranin ic Eogan ic Cainig ic Cranin mc Gilleeoin ha hairde ic Eirc ic Loirn ic Fearchar mc Cormac ic Airbertaig ic Feradaig. (Note: William Forbes Skene stated, in his late 19th century Celtic Scotland, that judging from the generations within the MS 1467, Cormac mac Airbertach would appear to have lived in the 10th century, but the man represented as his father, Airbertach, is given as the son of Feradach, and brother of Ferchar Fota who died in 697. Skene considered many of the early generations represented in the pedigrees of various clans within the MS 1467 to be unreliable.)	Paul son of Tire son of Ewen son of Murdoch son of Paul son of Gilleanrias son of Martin son of Paul son of Kenneth son of Crinan son of Ewen son of Kenneth son of Crinan son of Gilleoin of the Aird son of Erc son of Lorn son of Ferchar son of Cormac son of Oibertaigh son of Feradach.
Skene's late 19th century transcription of the Gaelic	Skene's late 19th century translation into English
Pal mac Tire mhic Eogain mhic Muredaig mhic Poil mhic Gilleainnrias mhic Martain mhic Poil mhic Cainnig mhic Cristin mhic Eogain mhic Cainnig mhic Cristin mhic Gillaeoin na hairde mhic Eirc mhic Loairn mhic Ferchair mhic Cormac mhic Airbertaigh mhic Fearadhach.	Paul son of Tire son of Ewen son of Muredach son of Paul son of Gillandres son of Martin son of Paul son of Kenneth son of Cristin son of Ewen son of Kenneth son of Cristin son of Gillaeoin of the Aird son of Erc son of Lorn son of Ferchard son of Cormac son of Airbertach son of Feradach.

=== Summary ===
According to this manuscript, the clan's chief was Paul Mactire, a man who appears in contemporary records in the 1360s. The manuscript records that Paul's 3rd great-grandfather was Gillanders, who was in turn eight generations in descent from Gilleoin of the Aird, who is also recorded within as the progenitor of the Mackenzies and the Mathesons. Gilleoin of the Aird is thought to have flourished around 1140, and is thought to have governed a large expanse of land in the north of Scotland, independent of the 12th century mormaers of Moray. According to Alexander Grant, he is likely to have filled the vacuum in southern Ross, left by the reduction of Norse power in the later part of the 11th century.

According to William Forbes Skene, this manuscript shows that Paul descended from a brother of Fearchar, Earl of Ross. W. D. H. Sellar pointed out that there are too many generations between Paul and Gilleoin of the Aird. Sellar considered that the genealogy combined the descendants of Gilleoin of the Aird with the ancestors of Paul; thus, that the genealogy should actually start with the Paul who appears in the manuscript as Gillander's grandfather. However, according to William Matheson, it is possible that this Paul is Páll Bálkason, a 13th-century sheriff of Skye. Matheson considered that Páll Bálkason's father was an ancestor of the MacPhails, MacKillops, and the MacLeods. (Note: Sellar disagreed with Matheson's assertion that the MacLeods descended in the male line from Páll Bálkason.)

The personal name Gillanders is an Anglicised form of a Gaelic name meaning 'Servant of (St) Andrew'. The Gaelic name was a common one in mediaeval Scotland. According to Grant, there are two men who appear in contemporary records in the 13th century, that may belong to the clan. These men are Gillanders MacIsaac, and Isaac MacGillanders, who are thought to be father and son. According to Grant, since Gillanders MacIsaac flourished in about 1231, this could make him a contemporary of the Gillanders recorded in the manuscript, and possibly could mean they are the same individual. Grant suggested that the lands of Gillanders MacIsaac may have been on the Black Isle, or lower Strathconon, or around Dingwall.

== Clan Ross ==
A 17th-century tradition stated that the daughter of Paul Mactire married a Ross of Balnagown, and from then on the Rosses were known in Gaelic as Clan Leamdreis.
