= Scotsburn, Highland =

Settlement in Easter Ross, Scotland

Coordinates: 57.757077°N 4.147883°W

Scotsburn
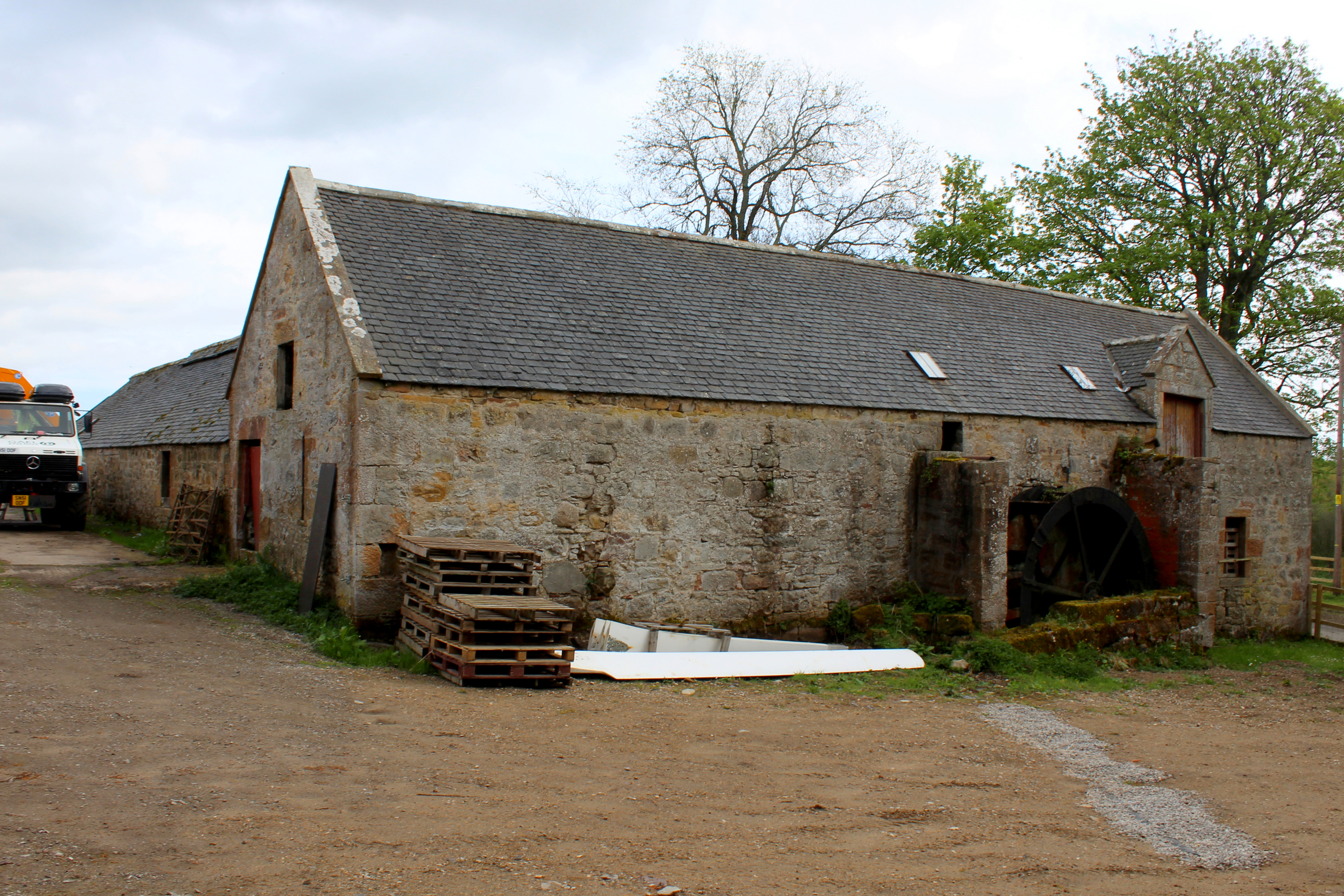
- Old Watermill at Scotsburn House

- Location within the Ross and Cromarty area
- Population: 153 (2011)
- OS grid reference: NH769763
- Civil parish: Logie Easter
- Council area: Highland
- Lieutenancy area: Ross and Cromarty
- Country: Scotland
- Sovereign state: United Kingdom
- Post town: Tain
- Police: Scotland
- Fire: Scottish
- Ambulance: Scottish
- UK Parliament: Caithness, Sutherland and Easter Ross (UK Parliament constituency)
- Scottish Parliament: Caithness, Sutherland and Ross (Scottish Parliament constituency)

Scotsburn is a settlement located in the civil parish of Logie Easter, about one mile (1.6 km) west of Lamington and six miles (9.7 km) south-west of Tain, in Easter Ross, Scottish Highlands. It is in the Scottish council area of Highland. In 2011 it had a population of 152. Nearby Scotsburn Wood contains a number of cairns, which were almost certainly erected to mark an ancient battle.

Scotsburn House, formerly one of the principal mansions of the parish, was built around 1800–1810.

Scotsburn primary school, which opened in the mid 19th century, closed in 1997.
