= Houston House, Renfrewshire =

House in Renfrewshire, Scotland

Houston House

Location
- Coordinates: 55.871369°N 4.540511°W

Site history
- Built: 16th century

Houston House is an 18th-century mansion, about 1 mile (1.6 km) north and east of Bridge of Weir, Renfrewshire, Scotland, north of the village of Houston.

It incorporates remains of a 16th-century castle.

Arms of Matthew Stewart, 4th Earl of Lennox

== History ==
The castle belonged to the Stewart Earls of Lennox; the name derives from Hugh de Paduinan or Padvinan (Hugh's town). When the mansion was built in 1780 most of the castle was demolished. The Speirs family, of Elderslie, acquired the property in 1782. Additions were made in 1872 and 1873.

== Structure ==
The original structure was a courtyard castle, with a high tower at the north west corner. The entrance was arched, and the south front had two turrets. The north east side, which is a long narrow building, and remains after the alterations, has a doorway dated 1625.

== See also ==
- Castles in Great Britain and Ireland
- List of castles in Scotland
