= Dounie =

Coordinates: 57.88132°N 4.42011°W

Dounie: Scottish Gaelic: Dùnaidh
- Location within the Sutherland area
- OS grid reference: NH565905
- Council area: Highland
- Country: Scotland
- Sovereign state: United Kingdom
- Post town: Ardgay
- Postcode district: IV24 3
- Police: Scotland
- Fire: Scottish
- Ambulance: Scottish

Dounie (Scottish Gaelic: Dùnaidh) is a small remote scattered hamlet in Sutherland, Scottish Highlands and is in the Scottish council area of Highland. The River Carron runs through Dounie.

It lies within the civil parish of Kincardine and Community council of Ardgay and District.
