= Erskine Castle =

Castle in Renfrewshire, Scotland

Location
- Coordinates: 55.9202°N 4.4763°W

Erskine Castle was a castle, about 5 miles (8 km) north of Erskine, Renfrewshire, Scotland, south of the River Clyde, on the shore.

== History ==
The Erskines were the owners of the site by 1226. It was purchased by Sir John Hamilton of Orbiston in 1638; it was then sold to Alexander Stuart, 5th Lord Blantyre in 1703.

== Structure ==
There is no longer any trace of the castle.

== See also ==
- Castles in Great Britain and Ireland
- List of castles in Scotland
