= Inchinnan Castle =

16th-century castle in Inchinnan, Scotland

Location
- Coordinates: 55.895966°N 4.4293628°W

Site history
- Built: 16th century

Inchinnan Castle was a 16th-century castle, about 1 mile (1.6 km) south and east of Erskine, Renfrewshire, Scotland, and about 0.5 miles (0.8 km) north of the village of Inchinnan, south of the shore of the River Clyde, opposite Newshot Island.

The structure was alternatively known as Inchinnan Palace.

Arms of Stewart, Hereditary Grand Steward of Scotland: Or, a fess chequy argent and azure, adopted at the start of the age of heraldry, c.1200-1215.

== History ==
In 1151 Inchinnan belonged to the Lord High Steward of Scotland, but it was acquired by the Stewart Earls of Lennox. It appears that in the 13th century the Croc family were granted Inchinnan as it was included in the lordship of Darnley and Inchinnan, which belonged to Sir Robert Croc. Matthew Stewart, 2nd Earl of Lennox rebuilt and enlarged the castle in about 1506. James V of Scotland visited on 15 October 1525.

An inventory was made of the contents of the castle and its chapel around the year 1570. The chapel goods included; two missals, statues of Jesus as a baby, the Virgin Mary and St Anne, with an ivory statue for a hanging chandelier.

The castle passed to the crown in 1571, and after belonging to other Stewarts it was acquired by the Earls of Lennox and Richmond. The lands were finally acquired by the Campbells of Blythswood.

== Structure ==
While there were considerable remains up to 1710, there is now no visible evidence.

== See also ==
- Castles in Great Britain and Ireland
- List of castles in Scotland
