= Belltrees Peel =

Medieval tower in Renfrewshire, Scotland

- Renfrewshire, Scotland
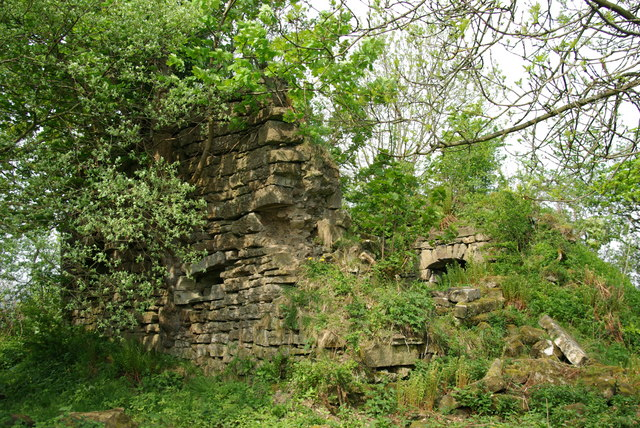
- Ruins of Belltrees Peel; GB grid reference NS3609758774

Site information
- Condition: Ruin

Location
- Shown within Scotland
- Location within Scotland
- Coordinates: 55.794444°N 4.614722°W

Site history
- Built: 16th century
- Materials: Stone

Belltrees Peel is a medieval tower situated on a peninsula in Castle Semple Loch in Renfrewshire, Scotland, on which was once an island.

== History ==
The tower was constructed between 1547 and 1572 as an unusual, low tower, with an irregular hexagonal plan. The remains of the tower house are protected as a scheduled monument.

It was a Semple property, and was occupied by Sir James Semple of Belltrees. He was educated with James VI, an acted as Ambassador to France in 1601. The Semples later used the Belltrees Peel as a shelter when sailing on Castle Semple Loch.
