= John Lockhart-Ross =

Royal Navy admiral (1721–1790)

Vice-Admiral Sir John Lockhart-Ross Bt
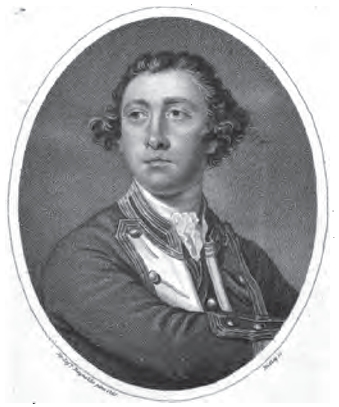
- Lockhart-Ross, c. 1760
- Born: 11 November 1721; Lockhart Hall, Lanarkshire
- Died: 9 June 1790 (aged 68); Balnagown Castle, Ross-shire
- Relatives: William Ross, 12th Lord Ross (grandfather)
- Military career
- Allegiance: Great Britain
- Branch: Royal Navy
- Service years: 1735–1790
- Rank: Vice-Admiral
- Commands: HMS Vulcan; HMS Kent; HMS Savage; HMS Tartar; HMS Chatham; HMS Royal George; HMS Bedford; HMS Shrewsbury
- Conflicts: War of the Austrian Succession; First Battle of Cape Finisterre; Second Battle of Cape Finisterre; Seven Years' War; Raid on Le Havre; Battle of Quiberon Bay; American War of Independence; Battle of Ushant; Action of 8 January 1780; Battle of Cape St. Vincent; Relief of Gibraltar

Vice-Admiral Sir John Lockhart-Ross, 6th Baronet (11 November 1721 – 9 June 1790), known as John Lockhart from 1721 to 1760, was an officer of the Royal Navy who saw service during the War of the Austrian Succession, Seven Years' War, and the American War of Independence, and served for a time as a Member of Parliament.

Lockhart was born into a gentry family in 1721 and embarked on a naval career. He served on a number of ships during the War of the Austrian Succession, seeing action at both the First and Second Battles of Cape Finisterre, having by then risen to the rank of lieutenant. He had his own commands by the outbreak of the Seven Years' War, and enjoyed particular success as a frigate captain, cruising against privateers while in command of HMS Tartar. Further commands followed, including roles in detached squadrons at the Battle of Quiberon Bay. Taking the additional name Ross after he inherited a deceased relative's estates, he served as a member of parliament and undertook land reforms and improvements during the years of peace before the outbreak of the American War of Independence.

Lockhart-Ross returned to sea on the outbreak of war, commanding a ship at the Battle of Ushant, and later being promoted to flag rank. He served in several actions as a junior commander of Rodney's fleet, including the capture of the Caracas convoy, the Battle of Cape St. Vincent and the relief of Gibraltar. He then retired ashore, devoting himself to his estates until his death in 1790. He was succeeded in the baronetcy he had inherited in 1778 by his son.

== Family and early life ==
Lockhart was born on 11 November 1721 at Lockhart Hall, Lanarkshire, the fifth son of Sir James Lockhart, 2nd Baronet. His mother, Grizel, was the third daughter of William Ross, 12th Lord Ross. Lockhart joined the navy in September 1735, serving first aboard the 50-gun HMS Portland under Captain Henry Osborne. He transferred to the 50-gun HMS Diamond under Captain Charles Knowles in the West Indies between 1737 and 1738, and went on to serve aboard the 54-gun HMS Romney under Captain Henry Medley in 1739, and the 14-gun sloop HMS Tryall under Captain Frogmere in 1740. Lockhart followed Frogmere to several of his ships, serving under him aboard the 20-gun HMS Lively and then the 54-gun HMS Ruby. He passed his lieutenant's examination on 28 September 1743, and received his commission with a posting on 21 October that year to the 44-gun HMS Dover in the North Sea, and afterwards on the coast of North America. While serving on the North American station he was moved into the 50-gun HMS Chester and returned to England with her in late 1746.

Lockhart's next appointment was to the 66-gun HMS Devonshire in April 1747. Devonshire was the flagship of Rear-Admiral Peter Warren, under whom Lockhart saw action at the First Battle of Cape Finisterre on 3 May 1747. He was then appointed to his first command, that of the fireship HMS Vulcan, in which he saw action with Sir Edward Hawke's fleet at the Second Battle of Cape Finisterre on 16 October 1747. One of the captains in the battle, Thomas Fox of the 64-gun HMS Kent, was later relieved of his command after controversy over his actions in the engagement, and Lockhart was given temporary command of Kent in his place. During 1748 Lockhart was first lieutenant of the Portsmouth guardship HMS Invincible, and for the next few years was on half pay in Scotland. In January 1755 he was appointed first lieutenant of the 90-gun HMS Prince with Captain Charles Saunders, and on 22 April 1755 he was promoted to command the 8-gun sloop HMS Savage, attached during the year to the western squadron cruising under the command of Sir Edward Hawke or Vice-Admiral John Byng.

== Command ==
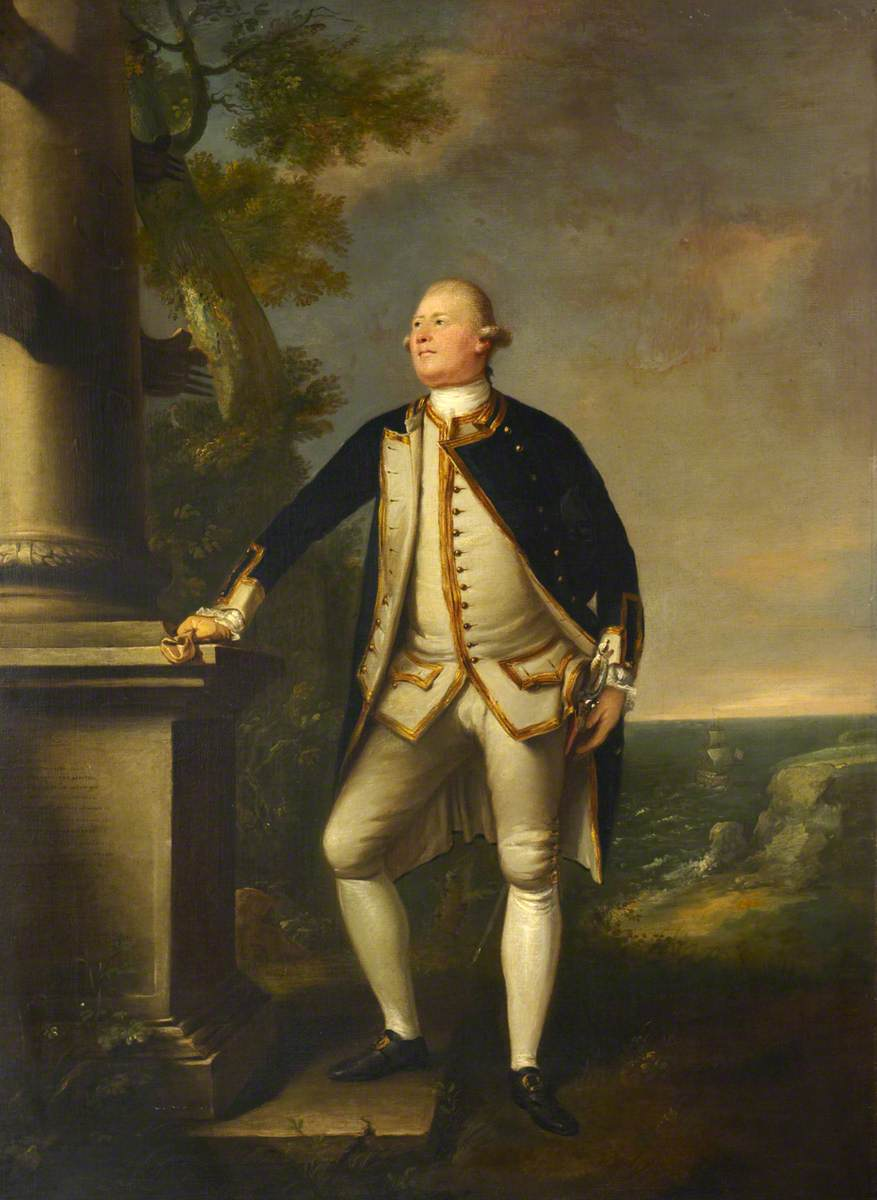
Sir John Lockhart-Ross by Johann Zoffany

On 23 March 1756 Lockhart was posted to the 28-gun HMS Tartar, which he commanded for several cruises in the Channel, capturing several large privateers of equal or superior force, among them the 22-gun Cerf with 211 men, the 26-gun Grand Gideon with 190 men, and the 20-gun Mont-Ozier of Rochelle with 170 men. Lockhart was severely wounded in the capture of the Mont-Ozier on 17 February 1757, and had to be invalided on shore for the next two months. He rejoined the Tartar and on 15 April, off Dunnose, Isle of Wight, he captured the 26-gun Duc d'Aiguillon of St. Malo with 254 men; and on 2 November the 36-gun Melampe with 320 men. The latter ship was added to the navy as the 36-gun frigate HMS Melampus.

As a reward for Lockhart's services, the Admiralty offered him the command of the 50-gun HMS Chatham, which was then nearing completion, and making several promotions from Tartar's crew. He was also presented by the merchants of London and of Bristol with pieces of plate 'for his signal service in supporting the trade;’ and by the corporation of Plymouth with the freedom of the borough in a gold box. Lockhart spent the next few months recuperating at Bath and waiting for the Chatham to be launched. She was duly launched in April 1758 and Lockhart took command, taking many of his officers and men from Tartar to crew her, with the Admiralty's permission. Lockhart had her fitted for sea by May, and spent June to September cruising against privateers in the North Sea.

Chatham was then ordered into the Channel and later joined the fleet under Sir Edward Hawke. On 18 May, she and the frigates Thames and Venus captured the French frigate Aréthuse after a battle that resulted in 60 French crew killed or wounded, 15 casualties on Thames and five on Venus. Aréthuse subsequently had a lengthy career in the Royal Navy as HMS Arethusa.

Chatham spent the summer under Rear-Admiral George Brydges Rodney, taking part in the Raid on Le Havre before rejoining Hawke in October, and then being sent to join a squadron under Commodore Robert Duff, to watch the French in Quiberon Bay. The squadron observed the French fleet sail out, and were chased by them as they rushed to report the news to Hawke. Hawke brought his fleet against them and decisively defeated them at the Battle of Quiberon Bay on 20 November 1759. Four days later Hawke appointed Lockhart to command HMS Royal George in the place of Captain John Campbell, who was sent home with the despatches. In the end of January 1760 the Royal George came to Spithead, and a month later Lockhart was appointed to command the 64-gun HMS Bedford, forming part of the fleet under Hawke or Edward Boscawen.

== Later naval and parliamentary career ==
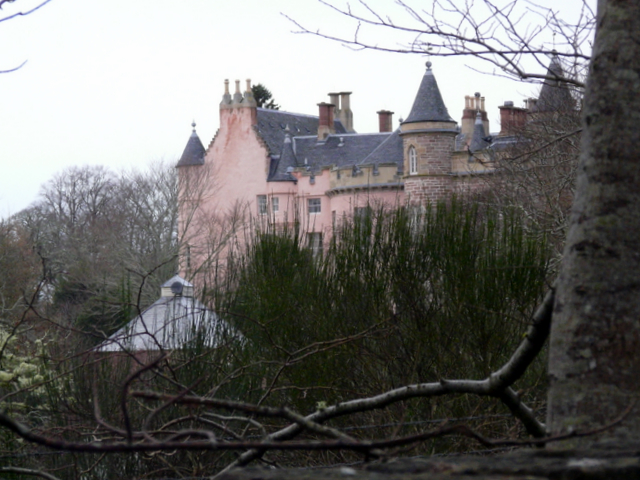
Balnagown Castle

With the death of his brother James in September 1760 Lockhart succeeded to the Ross estate of Balnagown, the entail of which obliged him to take the name of Ross; this he formally did in the following spring, announcing the change to the admiralty on 31 March 1761. He was then at Lockhart Hall, where he seems to have passed the winter on leave, but afterwards rejoined the Bedford during the summer. In September he applied to be relieved from the command, and on 27 September was placed on half pay. In the previous June he had been elected member of parliament for Lanark Burghs, but it does not appear that he took any active interest in parliamentary business. He devoted himself principally to the improvement of his estates and the condition of the peasantry, and became known as 'the best farmer and the greatest planter in the country; his wheat and turnips showed the one, his plantation of a million of pines the other'. He was MP for Lanark Burghs from 1761 to 1768 and in 1762, he initiated land tenure reform which would later evolve into the Highland Clearances. He was MP for Lanarkshire from 1768 to 1774.

In 1777, when war with France appeared imminent, Ross returned to active service, and was appointed to the 74-gun HMS Shrewsbury, joining the fleet under Admiral Augustus Keppel in the Battle of Ushant on 27 July 1778. On 13 August, by the successive deaths of his elder brothers without male issue, he succeeded to the baronetcy. On 19 March 1779 he was promoted to the rank of rear-admiral, and during the summer, with his flag in the Royal George, he was fourth in command in the Channel. In September he was sent with a small squadron into the North Sea to look out for John Paul Jones, but Jones, after capturing the Serapis in 1779, made good his escape. Continuing in the Channel Fleet, Ross was with Rodney at the capture of the Caracas convoy, the Battle of Cape St. Vincent and the relief of Gibraltar in January 1780; with George Darby at the relief of Gibraltar in April 1781; and with Lord Howe during the early summer of 1782. On the return of the fleet to Spithead in August he resigned his command, and had no further employment afloat. He became a vice-admiral on 24 September 1787, and died at Balnagown Castle in Ross-shire on 9 June 1790. He married Elizabeth, daughter of Robert Dundas of Arniston, the younger, in 1762 and had a number of children. Among them was his eldest son, Charles Lockhart-Ross, an army officer who inherited the baronetcy on his father's death, and George Ross, father of distinguished legal writer George Ross.

Parliament of Great Britain
Preceded by John Murray	Member of Parliament for Lanark Burghs; 1761–1768	Succeeded by James Dickson
Preceded by Daniel Campbell	Member of Parliament for Lanarkshire; 1768–1774	Succeeded by Andrew Stuart
Baronetage of Nova Scotia
Preceded by George Lockhart-Ross	Baronet (of Carstairs); 1778–1790	Succeeded by Charles Lockhart-Ross
