= Lockhart-Ross baronets =

Extinct baronetcy in the Baronetage of Nova Scotia

- Creation date: 1672
- Status: extinct
- Extinction date: 1942

The Lockhart, later Lockhart-Ross Baronetcy, of Carstairs in the County of Lanark, was a title in the Baronetage of Nova Scotia.

== History ==
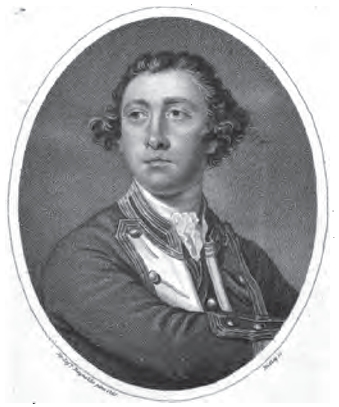
Sir John Lockhart-Ross, 6th Baronet

It was created on 28 February 1672 for William Lockhart. The fourth Baronet used the surname Ross-Lockhart, which was also borne by the sixth, seventh, eighth and ninth Baronets. The sixth Baronet was an admiral in the Royal Navy and sat as Member of Parliament for Lanark and Lanarkshire. The seventh Baronet was Member of Parliament for Tain Burghs, Ross-shire and Linlithgow Burghs. The ninth Baronet was an inventor and commercial entrepreneur. The title became extinct on his death in 1942.

== Lockhart-Ross baronets, of Carstairs ==
- Sir William Lockhart, 1st Baronet (died 1710)
- Sir James Lockhart, 2nd Baronet (died 1755)
- Sir William Lockhart, 3rd Baronet (1715–1758)
- Sir James Ross-Lockhart, 4th Baronet (1717–1760)
- Sir George Lockhart, 5th Baronet (1718–1778)
- Sir John Lockhart-Ross, 6th Baronet (1721–1790)
- Sir Charles Lockhart-Ross, 7th Baronet (1763–1814)
- Sir Charles William Frederick Augustus Lockhart-Ross, 8th Baronet (1812–1883)
- Sir Charles Henry Augustus Frederick Lockhart-Ross, 9th Baronet (1872–1942)

Coat of arms of Lockhart-Ross of Carstairs
| Crest A cubit arm naked and erect Proper, grasping a chaplet of laurel Vvert. Escutcheon Gules, three lions rampant, two and one, Argent. Supporters Two naked savages with clubs over their shoulders Proper, wreathed round the loins with laurel Vert. Motto Spem successus alit (success fosters hope) |

== See also ==
- Ross baronets
