= William Ross (footballer, born 1921) =

Scottish footballer

Personal information
- Full name: William Lindsay Ross
- Date of birth: 3 May 1921
- Place of birth: Hamilton, Scotland
- Date of death: 14 November 1995 (aged 74)
- Place of death: Glasgow, Scotland
- Position: Centre half

Youth career
- Glasgow University

Senior career*
Years	Team	Apps	(Gls)
1947–1956	Queen's Park	84	(2)

International career
1949	Scotland Amateurs	1	(0)
- * Club domestic league appearances and goals

William Lindsay Ross (2 May 1921 – 14 November 1995) was a Scottish footballer who played in the Scottish League for Queen's Park as a centre half. After his retirement, he served the club in a number of administrative roles. Ross was capped by Scotland at amateur level.

== Personal life ==
Ross served in the Royal Air Force during the Second World War and later worked as a solicitor.
