= Sir Charles Ross, 9th Baronet =

British entrepreneur and inventor of the Ross rifle (1872-1942)

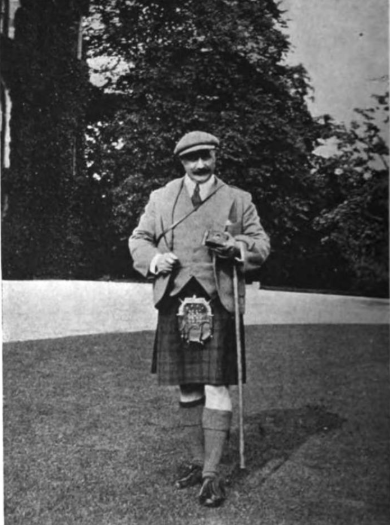
- Born: Charles Henry Augustus Frederick Lockhart Ross; 4 April 1872; Balnagown Castle, Scotland
- Died: 29 June 1942 (aged 70); St. Petersburg, Florida
- Education: Eton College
- Occupations: Inventor, entrepreneur
- Known for: Ross rifle
- Spouses: Winifred Berens (div. 1897) Patricia B. Ellison (m. 1901; div. 1930) Dorothy Mercado (m. 1938)

Sir Charles Henry Augustus Frederick Lockhart Ross, 9th Baronet (4 April 1872 – 29 June 1942) was a British inventor and commercial entrepreneur who invented the innovative and often controversial straight-pull actioned Ross rifle.

== Biography ==
Ross was born at Balnagown Castle, the son of Sir Charles William Frederick Augustus Lockhart-Ross, 8th Baronet and his second wife, Rebecca Sophia Barnes of Tufnell Park. He inherited the Baronetcy on the death of his father in 1883 when he was aged 11. He was educated at Eton College and while he was there, his mother's indulgences on him included "a magnificent ocean-going steam yacht, a large sailing yacht, the most superbly appointed and biggest steam launch for river use on the Thames, and a coach and four". When he came of age, he instituted a lawsuit against his mother for having, during his minority, spent more of the revenues of his estates than she was entitled to by law or by the terms of the will. He was then at Trinity College, Cambridge. In 1894 he rowed in the Cambridge boat in the Boat Race. He was known as a capable sharpshooter and big game hunter.

Ross became a lieutenant in the 3rd Battalion, the Seaforth Highlanders and served in the Second Anglo-Boer War. He designed the Ross rifle, which was initially used by his own Machine Gun Battery during the Boer War. He was a captain in Lovat Scouts Yeomanry from 1904 to 1913. He was an advisor on small arms to the Canadian Government and he designed and built the plant of the West Kootenay Power and Light Co. on the Kootenay River at Bonnington Falls. During World War I his Ross rifle was mass-produced for the Canadian army. Sporting rifles bearing the Ross name were also popular for a time after the First World War, as was the .280 (approximately 7 mm) Ross sporting rifle cartridge.

Ross was said to have been Britain's largest landowner, possessing Scottish lands extending to an estimated 366,000 acres (1,480 km^{2}), with 3,000 tenants. At one point, in an attempt to evade United Kingdom taxation on the income from his arms manufacturing, Ross declared his Easter Ross, Scotland estate of Balnagown to be a territory of the United States of America, which led to his being branded an outlaw for a time by the British Government.

Ross married three times: first to Winifred Berens (marriage dissolved in 1897); then in 1901 to Louisville debutante Patricia Burnley Ellison, who divorced him in 1930; and in 1938 to his American secretary Dorothy Mercado (née Harvey). On Ross's death aged 70 in St. Petersburg, Florida, Dorothy inherited Balnagown Castle.

Balnagown Castle, not far from the north shore of the Cromarty Firth near Invergordon, and adjacent parts of the once-extensive Ross estate of Balnagown have been owned since 1972 by billionaire businessman and former Harrods owner Mohamed Al-Fayed, who has restored the castle.

== See also ==
- List of Cambridge University Boat Race crews

== Other sources ==
- von der Schulenburg, Fritz (1998). Balnagown: Ancestral Home of the Clan Ross – A Scottish Castle Through Five Centuries. Brompton Press. ISBN 978-1-900055-07-9.

Baronetage of Nova Scotia
Preceded by Aubrey McMahon	Baronet (of Carstairs); 1883–1942	Extinct
