= Logie Hill =

Coordinates: 57.76021°N 4.06908°W

- Location within the Ross and Cromarty area
- OS grid reference: NH769763
- Council area: Highland
- Country: Scotland
- Sovereign state: United Kingdom
- Postcode district: IV18 0
- Police: Scotland
- Fire: Scottish
- Ambulance: Scottish

Logie Hill is a small village, located on a crossroads, 3 miles south of Tain, in Eastern Ross-shire, Scottish Highlands and is in the Scottish council area of Highland.

== History and Archaeology ==
To the southwest of Logie Hill lies the Hill of Logie, the site of a prehistoric settlement dating to the Bronze or Iron Age. Archaeological remains include circular hut circles ranging from 8 to 14 metres in diameter, as well as traces of a surrounding field system. The site is protected as a scheduled monument.

== Governance ==
The village is part of the Highland council area and falls under the Ross, Skye and Lochaber constituency for the UK Parliament and Caithness, Sutherland and Ross in the Scottish Parliament.
