= Lamington, Highland =

Coordinates: 57.76234°N 4.10365°W

Lamington
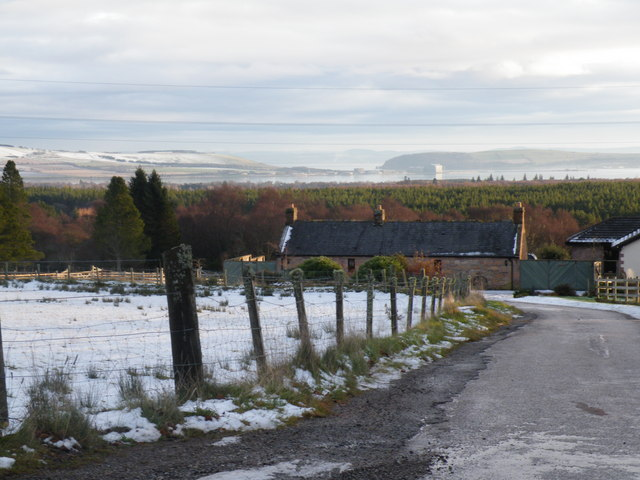
- Lamington School

- Location within the Ross and Cromarty area
- OS grid reference: NH749766
- Council area: Highland
- Country: Scotland
- Sovereign state: United Kingdom
- Post town: Invergordon
- Postcode district: IV18 0
- Police: Scotland
- Fire: Scottish
- Ambulance: Scottish

Lamington is a village, which sits in the southern edges of the Morangie forest in Eastern Ross-shire, Scottish Highlands and is in the Scottish council area of Highland.

The village of Tain is located 4 miles to the northeast.
