= Gryffe Castle =

Location
- Coordinates: 55.8628°N 4.5824°W

Site history
- Built: by 15th century

Gryffe Castle was a castle existing in 1474, probably about 0.5 miles (0.8 km) north of Bridge of Weir, Renfrewshire, Scotland.

The present Gryffe Castle is a mansion dating from 1841 or 1854.

== History ==
On the outskirts of Bridge of Weir is the magnificent edifice of Gryffe Castle, one of the most elegant residences in Renfrewshire. But although the modern mansion dates only from around 1854, there have been previous abodes of that name on the site since time immemorial.

Gryffe Castle is first mentioned as far back as 1474 when a charter confirmed by King James 11 it was handed over by John Knox of Ranfurly and Craigends to his son Uchtred Knox.

Around 1619 part of the estate came into the possession of Hugh of Montford and his descendants remained there until the end of the 17 century. But the Knoxes retained the major portion until 1665 when they sold it to Lord Cochrane who was later to become the first Earl of Dundonald and who also owned land at what is now Johnstone.

Robert Freeland of Broomward, whose grandfather John, had set up a cotton - spinning business at the Gryffe Mill in Bridge of Weir around 1779, erected the modern mansion during the middle of the 19 century. When Robert moved to the present day demesne of GryfFe Castle about 70 years later, the family's original abode at Broomward then became the residence of the GryfFe Mill which at that time employed many people from throughout the village.

In the years that followed, Gryffe Castle was to become the home of some of Renfrewshire's most illustrious families.

Among those who lived within its stately walls were the Barbours who owned land at Auchenames near Kilbarchan and William Alexander Campbell, whose cousin, Sir Henry Campbell Bannerman was Prime Minister of the United Kingdom during the early part of the 20 century.

Others who dwelled in its spacious rooms were the Dowager Lady Bine Renshaw who took up residence in May 1924; and Major Harold Glen Coats of Paisley who made a number of alterations to the building when he purchased it in 1931 and who built a number of cottages on the estate for those who were employed in the upkeep of the lands.

Sadly, however Major Glen Coats died just two years later although his wife and other members of the family continued to live there until 1949 - save for brief period during the Second World War when they lived in one of the cottages while the mansion was requisitioned by the Army as headquarters of the Western Scottish Command.

The mansion was then sold to the Corporation of Glasgow and used as a home for children.

Mrs Glen Coats then moved to a new abode in Wiltshire and when she died in 1969 the final link was severed in the long line of historic families, which had owned Gryffe Castle for almost 500 years

Yet there is an aura of historicity and antiquity about the old castle and few people can pass by the wooded ground, which encircles the proud residence without recalling some noteworthy events of the past.

A rising eminence nearby suggests that as long ago as the 12 century a Norman castle similar to that of Ranfurly might have stood there - similar to another fortification dating from that time which once occupied a site at Ranfurly on the other side of the valley of the River Gryffe.

These structures were known as a mote-and-bailey and comprised wooden, two storied edifices situated upon mounds and surrounded by a palisade of stakes. Yet despite its long history, one of the most momentous events occurred less than two centuries ago and its consequences had far reaching implications.

Quite close to the earlier mansion there was a farmhouse at Gryffe Castle and on the evening of Sunday March 19, 1797, a little cottage was the target of a raid by a gang of robbers who were in the district. It was around midnight when the four robbers broke into the house occupied by the fanner, James Barr - and terrorised the inhabitants. The occupants were threatened with knives, swords and cudgels, and made to hand over their money and possessions. This amounted to £11 in notes. £1 in silver, and some ornamental spoons. It could have been more because John Barr had been building a house in Bridge of Weir and had been in the habit of lifting money from the bank in Paisley to pay the tradesmen. As it was, however there was not much money in the house at the time of the raid and at the end of the robbery the gang made off to the home of the leader, a Billy Oak from Johnstone. The members of the gang were Thomas Potts from Paisley, and two Irishmen, William Pullins and George Aitchison, like Billy Oak, they were all weavers and eked out a meagre living for themselves each day at their looms.

Not long afterwards, Potts, and Aitcheson were apprehended and made to stand trial at the High Court of Justiciary in Edinburgh in July 1797. Aitcheson turned Crown evidence and along with John Barr, the farmer, Janet McLelland, his wife, and Jean Donaldson, James Rowan, and Joseph Lang, their servants, became witness for the prosecution. Thomas Potts was found guilty of the raid on the farmhouse and was sentenced to be executed at Paisley on Thursday August 17, 1797. From his prison cell the condemned'man wrote a long letter of farewell to his wife Mary who lived in the Williamsburgh district of the town. The letter was dated July 14, 1797 and is now in possession of the Paisley museum.

On the day of the execution a large crowd lined the pavements for the entire length of Moss Street, and much of the High Street. The gallows from which Potts was to be hanged was situated at the steeple at the junction of Moss Street and High Street and at the appointed hour the horse-drawn cart bearing the prisoner made its way along the cobbled streets from the Tollbooth in Gilmour Street. There was a frenzy of excitement among the hundreds of spectators who assembled to watch the event while some of the crowd shouted abuse and imprecations at the prisoner, others voiced their sympathy and support. At the stipulated time, the rope around Thomas Potts' neck tightened and seconds later he was dead: The dead man, who had been a member of the gang which raided the lonely little farmhouse at Gryffe Castle was the last person to be publicly executed at the Paisley Steeple.

The Barbours held the property in the 19th century. The mansion was built by Robert Freeland of Broomward. By 1975 it was a property belonging to Glasgow Corporation used as a children's home.

== Structure ==
Some of the castle may be incorporated in the mansion; there are no evidences of an ancient structure, although the prominent site would have been suitable for a castle.

- Castles in Great Britain and Ireland
- List of castles in Scotland
