= Hawkhead Hospital =

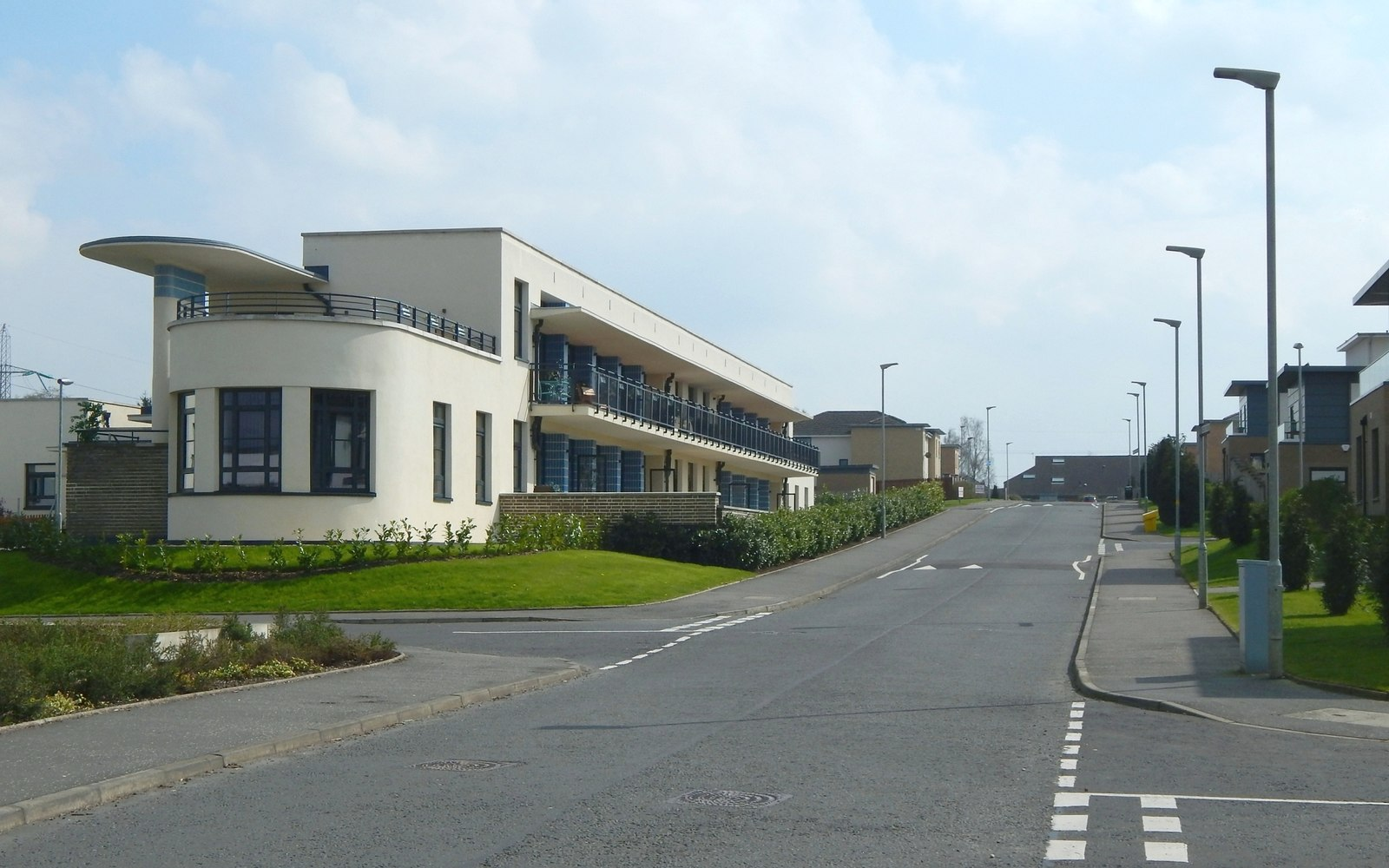
- Former isolation block at Hawkhead Hospital

- Shown in Renfrewshireshire

Geography
- Location: Hawkhead Road, Hawkhead, Scotland
- Coordinates: 55.8343°N 4.3918°W

Organisation
- Care system: NHS Scotland
- Type: General

Services
- Emergency department: No

History
- Founded: 1936
- Closed: 2005

Links
- Lists: Hospitals in Scotland

Hawkhead Hospital was a health facility on Hawkhead Road in Hawkhead, Renfrewshire, Scotland. The complex is Grade B listed.

== History ==
The facility, which was designed by Thomas S. Tait in the Art Deco style, opened as the Paisley Infectious Diseases Hospital in 1936. The hospital joined the National Health Service in 1948 and eventually closed in 2005. The site was subsequently developed by Kier Group with many of the historic buildings being converted for residential use as Hawkhead Village.

== See also ==
- List of listed buildings in Paisley, Renfrewshire
