= Kildary =

Coordinates: 57.7491°N 4.0713°W

Kildary: Scottish Gaelic: Caoldaraigh
- Location within the Ross and Cromarty area
- OS grid reference: NH768749
- Civil parish: Logie Easter
- Council area: Highland
- Country: Scotland
- Sovereign state: United Kingdom
- Post town: Tain
- Postcode district: IV18 0
- Police: Scotland
- Fire: Scottish
- Ambulance: Scottish

Kildary (Scottish Gaelic: Caoldaraigh) is a small village in Easter Ross, Ross and Cromarty, Highland, Scotland.

The village is located on the Balnagown River and is bordered by Balnagown Castle and the Balnagown estate, owned by Mohamed Al Fayed, former owner of Harrods department store. The main road A9 passes close by, running parallel to the Far North Line.

The only landmark visible from the A9 is Ken's Garage, which has been on the same site for many decades. Ken's Garage gets its name from the original proprietor Mr Ken Mackay. It is now owned by the Bannerman brothers. The A9 used to run in front of the garage until the road was realigned. Close by is an unusual Tudor-style lodge, known as East Lodge, attached to the Tarbat Estate.

Kildary railway station served the village until its closure on 13 June 1960. It was opened on 1 June 1864 as Parkhill and renamed Kildary on 1 May 1868. The station was demolished when the A9 was realigned, although the station building remains as a listed building.

The village is a good starting point for walks or drives – the Scotsburn area to the north is a warren of single track roads, and the village of Milton around 300 m (330 yd) to the south allows access to woodland and the Balnagown River, which can be followed down to the coast at the Cromarty Firth. The Scotsburn area was home to a number of German prisoners of war during World War II, who were employed in helping the farming community locally.

Kildary is an important site for those researching the Clan Ross. However, the castle is on private land and limited access permission must be obtained well before any visit.

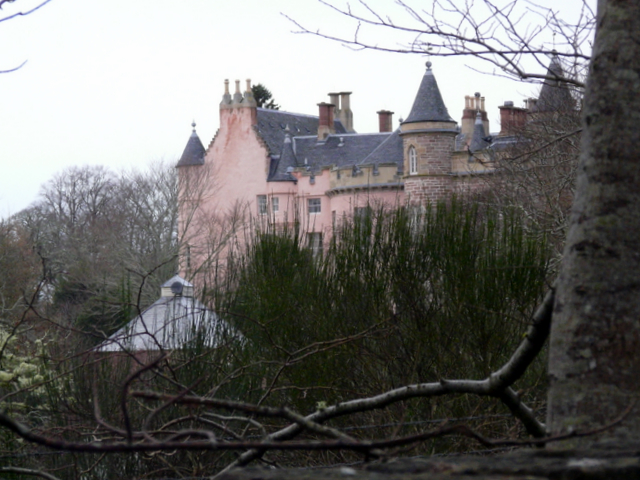
Balnagown Castle once the seat of the Chiefs of Clan Ross
