= Balnagown Castle =

Castle in Easter Ross, Scotland

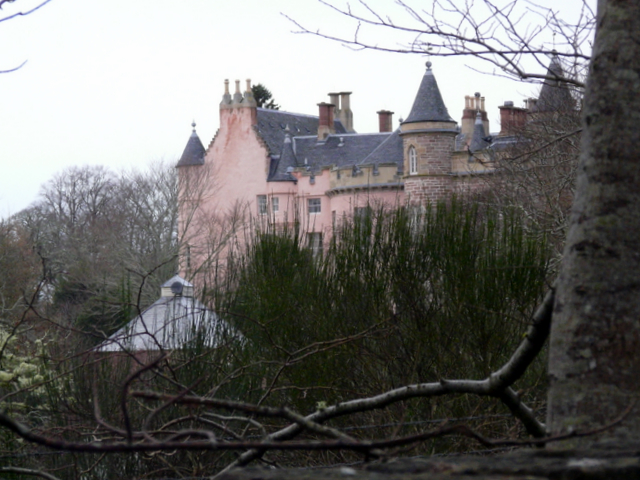

- Location in Highland
- 57.7494°N 4.0806°W

Listed Building – Category B
- Designated: 25 March 1971
- Reference no.: LB7866

Inventory of Gardens and Designed Landscapes in Scotland
- Official name: Balnagown Castle
- Designated: 1 July 1987
- Reference no.: GDL00046

Balnagown Castle (also Balnagowan)(Ross Castle) is beside the village of Kildary in Easter Ross, part of the Highland area of Scotland.

There has been a castle on the site since the 14th century, although the present building was remodelled in the 18th and 19th centuries. It is the ancestral home of the Chiefs of Clan Ross, although from the 1970s onwards it was owned by Egyptian-born businessman Mohamed Al-Fayed.

It is protected as a category B listed building, and the grounds are included on the Inventory of Gardens and Designed Landscapes in Scotland, the national listing of significant gardens.

== History ==
In the early 14th century, a castle was begun at Balnagown by Hugh, Mormaer (Earl) of Ross. Hugh was husband of Maud, sister of King Robert the Bruce, although after Hugh's death in 1333, his family lost royal favour and their lands were forfeit. Balnagown was acquired by a stepson of Hugh in 1375 who expanded the estate, a process which continued over the following centuries. On 11 November 1501 James IV was entertained by the laird's harper. In 1585 Alexander Ross, 9th laird of Balnagown, was outlawed, as was his son George.

During the Wars of the Three Kingdoms, David Ross, 12th of Balnagown, fought for King Charles II at the Battle of Worcester (1651), although he was captured and died in the Tower of London. The 13th laird, another David, married Anne, daughter of James Stuart, 4th Earl of Moray, in 1666. David and Anne rebuilt Balnagown, as attested by a datestone of 1672 on the castle, although they left no heir, and the estate passed to the Rosses of Halkhead in 1711.

In 1754, Balnagown passed to another branch of the family, when it was inherited by Admiral Sir John Lockhart-Ross, 6th Baronet. The admiral spent much time and money improving the Balnagown estate, becoming "the most efficient and enterprising Highland estate manager of his day." His son and heir Sir Charles Lockhart-Ross consulted James Gillespie Graham on Gothic Revival style alterations to the castle, and Italian gardens were laid out. Sir Charles Ross, 9th Baronet, inherited the castle in 1911. He continued the tradition of agricultural improvement, introducing the silo and the combine harvester to the estate. He also invented the Ross rifle, which he had manufactured in Canada. To prevent the seizure of Balnagown by the Inland Revenue, Ross had the estate declared a ward of the court of Delaware, and he was subsequently unable to return to Britain for fear of imprisonment.

From his death in 1942, until 1972, the castle was unoccupied and became dilapidated. In 1972, it was bought by Mohamed Al-Fayed, who began restoration of the house and grounds.
