= Hawkhead =

Area in Renfrewshire, Scotland

Coordinates: 55.834°N 4.385°W

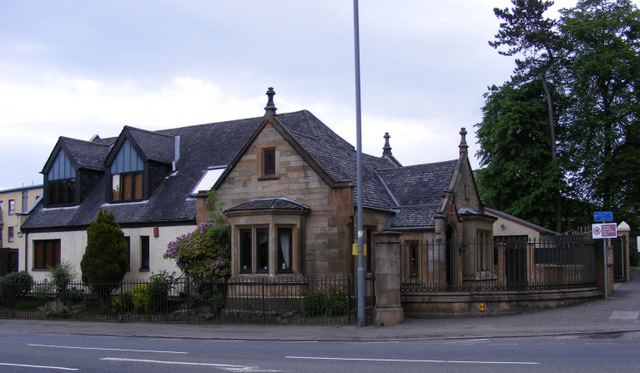
Gatehouse on Hawkhead Road

Hawkhead (Scots: Hauchheid, Scottish Gaelic: Ceann an Dail) is an area near Paisley in Renfrewshire, Scotland.

The village is on the Hawkhead Burn and White Cart Water, crossed via Hawkhead Bridge. It is near Dykebar, Hunterhill and Blackhall neighbourhoods and is the source of the name of Hawkhead railway station on the Paisley Canal Line, although the station is some distance to the north of the residential area, on the opposite side of a cleared industrial zone (formerly a BASF plant) and a large cemetery, also named Hawkhead.

== History ==
The area's name is recorded as Halkhead in some older maps and in the historical title of Lord Ross of Halkhead, with the family owning the estate from the 14th century. Their seat was Hawkhead House, constructed in the 17th century and part of Leverndale Hospital from 1914 until it was demolished in 1953. Its nearby associated farm dating from the late 18th century still exists and is Category C listed since 1997, although its owner in the early 21st century was using the property as a scrapyard (having been banned from keeping animals due to neglect).

Following the death in 1754 of William, the 14th and last Lord Ross, the Halkhead estates devolved upon his sisters and passed eventually into the family of the Earls of Glasgow. John Boyle, 3rd Earl of Glasgow had married Elizabeth Ross (16 April 1725 – 9 October 1791), the younger daughter of George Ross, 13th Lord Ross. In 1815 George Boyle, 4th Earl of Glasgow was created Baron Ross of Hawkhead,

The 1930s former Hawkhead Hospital (separate from Hawkhead Asylum), which was designed by the modernist architect Thomas S. Tait, has been redeveloped as "Hawkhead Village". A secondary school, St Andrew's Academy is located a short way south of the hospital grounds, near the junction of Hawkhead Road and Barrhead Road (A726).
