= Clan Ross =

Scottish clan

- Clann Anndrais or Na Rosaich
- Crest: A dexter hand holding a garland of laurel
- Motto: Spem Successus Alit (Success Nourishes Hope)

Profile
- Region: Highland
- District: Ross
- Plant badge: Juniper, or bearberry
- Pipe music: The Earl of Ross's March

Chief
- Chief of the Hereditary Coat of Arms of Ross, David Campbell Ross of Ross and Balnagown
- The Chief of Clan Ross
- Historic seat: Balnagown Castle
Septs of Clan Ross
Anderson, Andison, Andrew/s, Corbett, Crow/e, Croy, Deas, Denoon, Denune, Dingwall, Duthie, Fair, Fear/n, Gair, Gear, Gillanders, Hagart, Haggart, MacAndrew/s, MacCullie, MacCulloch, MacLulich, MacLulloch, MacTaggart, McTaggart, MacTear, MacTeer, MacTier, MacTire, MacTyre, Taggart, Tarrel, Tullo, Tulloch, Tyre, Vass, Wass, Waters, McEntagert (Ireland), McEnteggart (Ireland), McEntaggert (Ireland)
Clan branches
Ross of Balnagowan (chiefs)
Ross of Halkhead
Allied clans
Clan Munro
Clan Mackay (18th century)
Rival clans
Clan Mackenzie
Clan Matheson
Clan Macrae
Clan Mackay (15th century)
Kindreds
Leod Macgilleandrais
Paul Mactire
Clan Gillanders

Clan Ross (Scottish Gaelic: Clann Anndrais [ˈkʰl̪ˠãũn̪ˠ ˈan̪ˠt̪ɾɪʃ]) is a Highland Scottish clan. The original chiefs of the clan were the original Earls of Ross.

== History ==
=== Origins ===
The first recorded chief of the Clan Ross was "Fearcher Mac an t-Sagairt" which in English meant "son of the priest" alluding to his Ó Beólláin descent from the hereditary Abbots of Applecross. Fearchar helped King Alexander II of Scotland (1214–1249) crush a rebellion by Donald Bane, a rival claimant to the Scottish throne. Fearchar was knighted by the king and by 1234 he was officially recognized with the title of Earl of Ross.

The Earl's son, William was abducted in about 1250 in a revolt against the Earl's rule. However, he was rescued with help from the Munros who were rewarded with lands and who became closely connected with their powerful benefactors.

=== Wars of Scottish Independence ===
During the Wars of Scottish Independence the Clan Ross fought against the English at the Battle of Dunbar (1296) where their chief, the Earl of Ross was captured. This meant that for a short time William II, Earl of Ross sided with the English but he later supported Robert the Bruce of Scotland. The Clan Ross fought alongside King Robert the Bruce when Earl Fearchar's grandson William led the clan against the English at the Battle of Bannockburn in 1314. Hugh, Earl of Ross, was killed at the Battle of Halidon Hill in 1333.

=== 15th century and clan conflicts ===
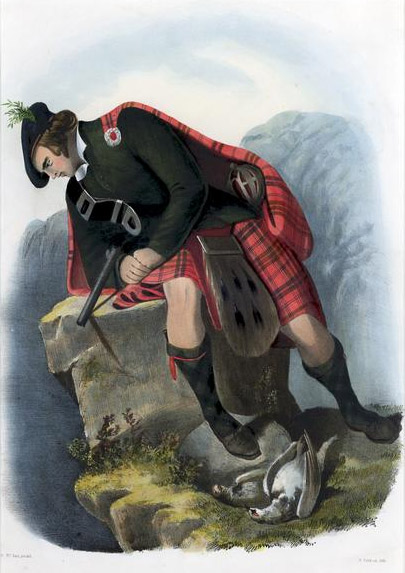
A romanticised Victorian-era illustration of a Ross clansman by R. R. McIan from The Clans of the Scottish Highlands published in 1845.

William III, Earl of Ross (6th Earl of Ross) died without male issue. The earldom of Ross and the chiefship of Clan Ross were then separated. The chiefship of the Clan Ross passed to Earl William's brother Hugh Ross of Rariches (1st of Balnagown), who was granted a charter, in 1374, for the lands of Balnagowan. The earldom of Ross passed through a female line, and that later led to dispute between two rival claimants—the Lord of the Isles and the Duke of Albany. This resulted in the Battle of Harlaw in 1411 where the Clan Ross fought with the Highlanders in support of the Lord of the Isles against an army led by the Earl of Mar under the urging of Robert, Duke of Albany. They were successful in defeating Mar.

The Rosses took part in the Battle of Verneuil 1424, against the English in France. On the death of the Earl of Buchan and Ross at that battle, James I claimed Earldom of Ross for himself though the rightful claim to the title was in Alexander of Islay, Lord of the Isles. James I eventually restored the earldom to the heiress of line, Mariota, Countess of Ross, the mother of Alexander of Islay, Lord of the Isles who became the Earl of Ross.

In the late 15th century the Clan Mackay and Clan Ross had long been at feud. This resulted in the Battle of Tarbat in 1486 where the Mackays were defeated by the Rosses and the Mackay chief was killed. This was followed by the Battle of Aldy Charrish where the Rosses were defeated by the Mackays and the Ross chief was killed along with many of his clan. According to 17th-century historian Sir Robert Gordon, who was a younger son of Alexander Gordon, 12th Earl of Sutherland, the Clan Sutherland joined the side of the Clan Mackay at this battle. However 19th-century historian Angus Mackay disputes the Sutherland's presence at the battle stating that it would be unlikely that the Earl of Sutherland at the time would have assisted against the Rosses as he was married to a daughter of the Ross chief of Balnagowan, and also that the feudal superiority of the Sutherlands over the Mackays "nowhere existed save in his own fertile imagination".

In 1496, the King summoned chiefs David Ross and Iye Roy Mackay. He ordered them to appear before the Earl of Argyll who was then the Lord High Chancellor of Scotland and make peace, on the understanding that should they not be peaceful that they would be fined 500 merks. The Mackays continued to raid the Rosses and it would appear the civil authority was too feeble to stop them. However the Mackays soon became involved in feuding with the Clan Sutherland and raids on the Rosses did not continue.

=== 16th century and Anglo-Scottish Wars ===
The Calendar of Fearn which is a manuscript of the Clan Ross records a Hugh Ross, some time cadet of the Rosses of Balnagowan, who was killed at the Battle of Achnashellach in 1504/05. Contemporary documents, the Munro Writs show that he was a procurator for William Munro, 12th Baron of Foulis who led the royal forces at this battle.

During the Anglo-Scottish Wars, John Ross, 2nd Lord Ross of Halkhead, died when leading his forces against the English at the Battle of Flodden on 9 September 1513.

Chief Alexander Ross 9th of Balnagowan (d.1592) is recorded as being a man of violence, utterly unscrupulous, given to raiding lands and forcing his clansmen to draw out agreements in his favour with total disregard for the law. Soon he was imprisoned in Tantallon Castle. Later he was released on the condition that he would live peacefully but he did not. His own son George was given permission to use fire and sword against him but Alexander could not be brought in. Alexander died in 1592.

=== 17th century and Civil War ===
George 10th of Balnagowan was educated at St Andrew's University, the first Ross chief to receive university education. However, he became as notorious as his father and died in 1615. His son David 11th of Balnagowan was a more peace- and law-abiding chief than his father and grandfather. David died in 1632 and his son, also called David, succeeded him.

David Ross 12th of Balnagowan signed the National Covenant at Inverness on 26 April 1638. He later joined the royalists for a short time only to become a covenanter again and was present at the defeat of James Graham, 1st Marquess of Montrose at the Battle of Carbisdale in 1650. The Clan Ross and Clan Munro fought on the side of the Scottish Government, then led by the Duke of Argyll. They defeated the royalist army of James Graham, 1st Marquess of Montrose. David Ross, 12th of Balnagowan later led some of the clan at the Battle of Worcester on 3 September 1651 where he was captured and imprisoned at the Tower of London. He is said to have died there in 1653 and been buried in Westminster.

In 1689, 100 men of the Clan Ross occupied Castle Leod to watch for movements of the Jacobite Mackenzies.

=== 18th Century ===
==== Jacobite rising of 1715–1719 ====
In 1715, during the Jacobite rising, the Clan Ross along with their allies the Clan Munro, Clan Mackay and Clan Sutherland were forced into a retreat by a larger force of Jacobites in what is known as the Skirmish of Alness. The Jacobites were led by William Mackenzie, 5th Earl of Seaforth, chief of the Clan Mackenzie.

The clan rivalries which had erupted in rebellion were finding an outlet in local politics. The Mackenzie's Earl of Seaforth title came to an end in 1716, and it seems to have been arranged that while the Clan Ross held the county seat the Munros would represent the Tain Burghs. To secure the burghs, control of three out of the five was necessary. The Ross ascendancy was secure in Tain, and from 1716 to 1745 the Munros controlled Dingwall. In 1719 a company of men from the Clan Ross fought for the government at the Battle of Glen Shiel where the Jacobites, including the Mackenzies were defeated.

In 1721, a small force of men from the Clan Ross, led by chief William Ross 6th of the Pitcalnie line and his brother Robert went on a rent collecting expedition into the lands of the Mackenzies. They were defeated by a much larger force of Mackenzies at the Battle of Glen Affric. General Wade's report on the Highlands in 1724, estimated the combined clan strength of the Rosses and Munros at 700 men.

==== War in France ====
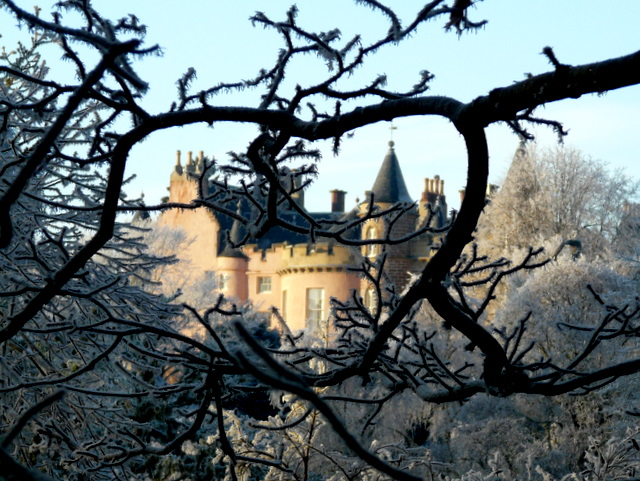
Balnagown Castle once seat of the chiefs of Clan Ross. It is now owned by Mohammed Al-Fayed.

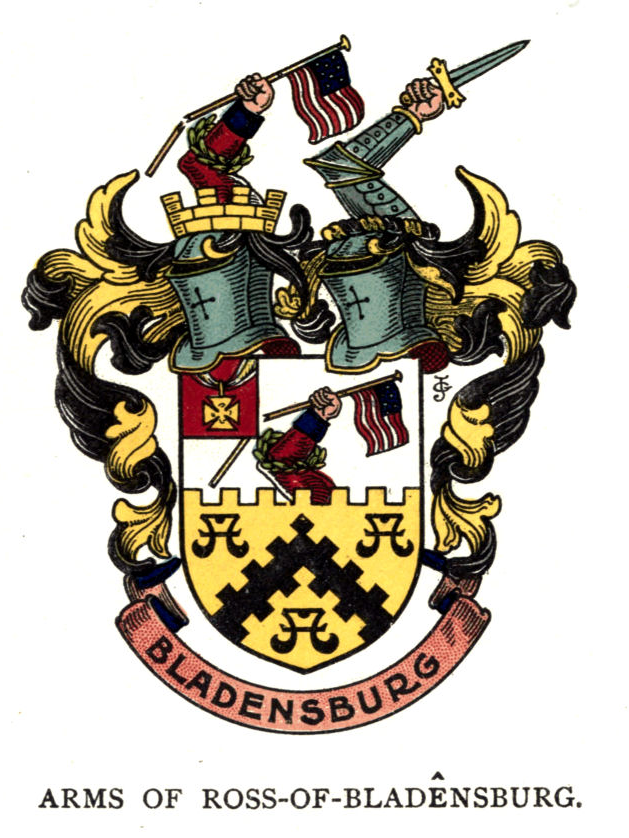
Ross of Bladensburg coat of arms

Col. Charles, 13th Lord Ross of Hawkhead and 15th of Balnagowan, was killed in 1745 leading some members of the clan at the Battle of Fontenoy fighting against the French on 30 April 1745. Balnagowan passed to George, 13th Lord Ross, in 1745. William, 14th Lord Ross, died unmarried, and Balnagowan then passed to Sir James Lockhard, 2nd Baronet of Carstairs.

==== Jacobite rising of 1745–1746 ====
During the Jacobite rising of 1745, in the County of Ross, although from the Pitcalnie line, the nominal 18th Chief of Clan Ross was Alexander Ross of Pitcalnie. He was a staunch Protestant, somewhat more tolerant of Jacobites than his father but definitely pro-Hanoverian. In addition, Alexander's uncle, Duncan Forbes of Culloden, was Lord President of the Court of Session for King George II of Great Britain's government in London. Duncan Forbes and Alexander Ross the Pitcalnie chief raised an Independent Highland Company to garrison Inverness Castle against the Jacobites.

The McFarquhars of Redcastle brought a strong Jacobite contingent from the Black Isle to join the forces of the Earl of Cromarty and a rebel, John Ross joined them. Forays were made before the Battle of Culloden and on the day before the battle, 15 April 1746, about 200 of the McFarquhar's Jacobite force were ambushed by pro-government Scots at the Battle of Littleferry near Golspie. At most, one-tenth survived; John Ross escaped to Sutherland but was first to be put on a list of rebels. However, apart from him the Clan Ross supported the government.

The chiefship of Clan Ross devolved upon Ross of Pitcalnie, heir of David who was the last of the direct line of Balnagowan. Sir John, the 5th baronet, assumed the name "Ross" and then, after Carstairs was sold in 1762, the designation "of Balnagowan."

The Balnagowan estate itself is no longer in Ross hands. Its recent owner, Egyptian millionaire Mohammed Fayed (d. 2023), former owner of the Harrods department store, put a lot of money into improving the estate and restoring the castle. The current Chief lives in Perthshire. His son, Hugh, and grandson, Calum, are both interested and involved in the Gaelic scene across Scotland.

== Chiefs ==
Following the death of David Campbell Ross of Ross and Balnagowan in 2024, Fiona Campbell Ross of Ross and Balnagowan has been recognised as Chief of Clan Ross by the Lord Lyon King of Arms.

== Tartans ==
Ross Tartan
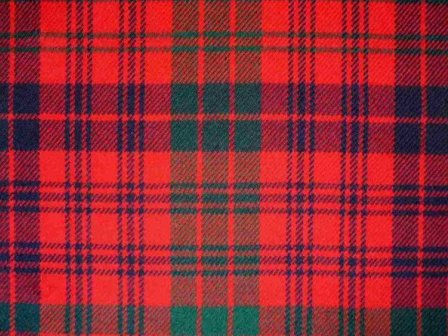
- The Ross Red tartan in modern colors.

Sett
- Tartan thread count: B36 R4 B36 R36 G4 R8 G4 R36 G36 R4 G36 R4 G36 R36 B2 R2 B4 R2 B2 R36

Tartan registries
- STWR: #449
- SRT entry: Ross

Clan Ross has three tartans:

- Ross Red tartan
- Ross Dress tartan (modern & ancient)
- Ross Hunting tartan (modern, ancient & weathered)

== Castles ==
- Balnagown Castle, eight miles north-east of Alness was originally built in the fourteenth century but was extended in later years. The castle was first built by the Rosses in 1375. The castle was lost by the Ross chiefs in the eighteenth century due to debt but was bought from them by the Rosses of Hawkhead who were a southern branch of the clan. The property remained with the Ross family until 1978. There are stories of two ghosts in the castle: the first is of black Andrew Munro of Milntown who is said to have been hanged from Balnagown Castle in 1522 after being found guilty of many dastardly deeds. (However, historian Alexander Mackenzie says that Munro died after falling down the steps of his own Milntown Castle and breaking his neck before 1522). Munro's ghost is said to manifest itself into women. The other ghost is of a young woman clad in grey dress with auburn hair and green eyes. The story goes that her skeleton is walled up somewhere in the castle.
- Hawkhead Castle was a mile east of Paisley in Renfrewshire. It consisted of a strong keep and tower that were later incorporated into a mansion. Hawkhead was a property of the Rosses from the middle of the fifteenth century and they built the original castle.
- Arnage Castle, near Ellon, Aberdeenshire is a Z-plan tower house that was sold to John Ross, Provost of Aberdeen in 1702. Not to be confused with Provost Ross's House that was home of the same John Ross and now houses part of Aberdeen Maritime Museum.
- Balconie Castle, near Alness, Ross and Cromarty, was held by the Earls of Ross.
- Caisteal nan Corr, also known as Invercassley, near Lairg in Sutherland, are the slight remains of a tower house once held by the Rosses.
- Pitcalnie Castle, near Cromarty, is the site of a castle that was held by the Munros but passed to the Rosses in the eighteenth century.
- Portencross Castle, also known as Ardneil Castle, near West Kilbride, in Ayrshire was originally held by the Rosses but passed to the Clan Boyd after the Wars of Scottish Independence.
- Sanquhar Castle near Sanquhar in Dumfries and Galloway was once held by the Rosses but passed to the Clan Crichton in the fourteenth century, and then much later to the Clan Douglas.
- Shandwick Castle, near Balintore, Easter Ross was held by the Rosses of Shandwick. (The Rosses of Shandwick are the present chiefs of Clan Ross). Sir Ronald Ross of Shandwick was an eminent physician who discovered the cause of Malaria.
- Tain Through Time in Tain, Ross and Cromarty has information about the Rosses in a Clan Ross centre.

== See also ==
- Chiefs of Clan Ross
- Earl of Ross
- Leod Macgilleandrais
- Paul Mactire
- Scottish clan

== Bibliography ==
- Coventry, Martin. (2008). Castles of the Clans: The Strongholds and Seats of 750 Scottish Families and Clans. ISBN 978-1-899874-36-1.
- Mackay, Angus. (1906). The Book of Mackay. (St Andrews University). Printed by William Rae, Wick.
- Mackay, Robert. (1829). History of the Clan and House of the Name Mackay
- Mackinnon, Donald. (1957). The Clan Ross. Edinburgh: W. & A. K. Johnston & G. W. Bacon. ISBN 978-0-7179-4537-5.
- Mackenzie, Alan. (2006). History of the Clan Mackenzie.
- Simpson, Peter. (1996). The Independent Highland Companies, 1603–1760. ISBN 0-85976-432-X.
- Way, George and Squire, Romily. (1994). Collins Scottish Clan & Family Encyclopedia. (Foreword by The Rt Hon. The Earl of Elgin KT, Convenor, The Standing Council of Scottish Chiefs).
