= Asterochloris italiana =

Scientific classification
- Kingdom: Plantae
- Division: Chlorophyta
- Class: Trebouxiophyceae
- Order: Trebouxiales
- Family: Trebouxiaceae
- Genus: Asterochloris
- Species: A. italiana

Binomial name
- Asterochloris italiana (P.A.Archibald) Skaloud & Peksa, 2010

Synonyms
- Trebouxia italiana P.A.Archibald, 1975

Species of lichen

Asterochloris italiana is a species of green alga in the family Trebouxiaceae. It was first formally described by the phycologist Patricia A. Archibald in 1975, as a species of Trebouxia. It was transferred to the genus Asterochloris in 2010.

Asterochloris italiana is characterised by vegetative cells that are spherical in shape, measuring between 8 and 15 μm during the log phase of growth, with cell walls that are 0.5 μm thick or less. As the cells transition to the stationary phase of culture, they enlarge to 20 μm, but their cell walls do not increase in thickness. Central to each cell is a pyrenoid, which is encircled by what appears to be a continuous starch sheath. This species is also notable for being multinucleate, meaning each cell contains multiple nuclei.

Reproduction in Asterochloris italiana occurs through the production of zoospores and aplanospores. Zoospores are small, measuring 2 to 4 μm wide and 3 to 5 μm long, and are distinguished by having an anterior nucleus and anterior stigma, which are indicative of their directionality and light-sensing capability, respectively.

This species was isolated from the lichen Xanthoria parietina by Ruggero Tomaselli, initially identified as Trebouxia decolorans by Vernon Ahmadjian, and is maintained in the Cambridge Culture Centre under the number 219/5b.

The alga has been identified from lichens collected in Ukraine, the Ural Mountains, and Antarctica. It is a frequent photobiont partner for the genus Cladonia, particularly Australasian specimens.
