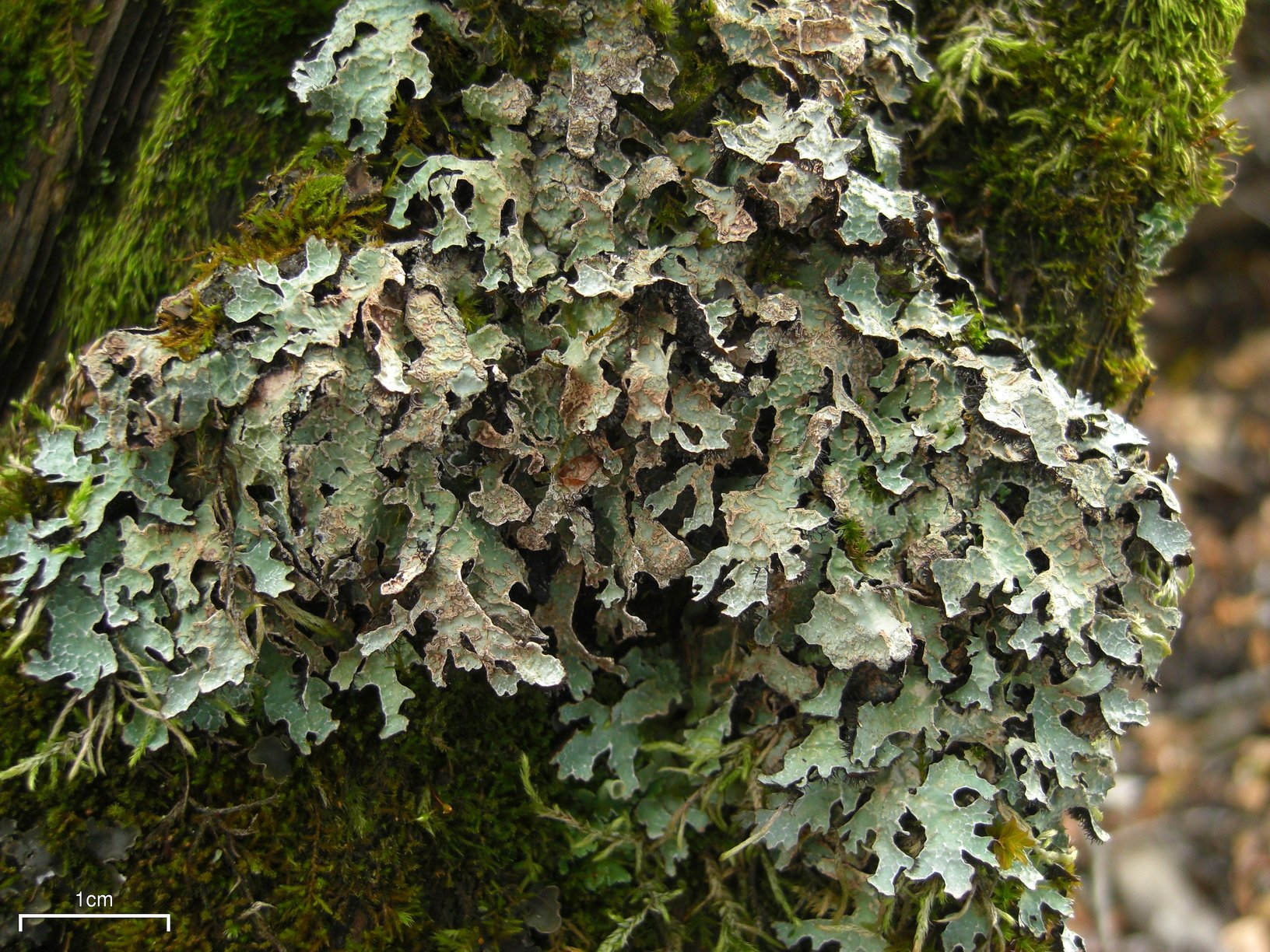

Scientific classification
- Kingdom: Fungi
- Division: Ascomycota
- Class: Lecanoromycetes
- Order: Lecanorales
- Family: Parmeliaceae
- Genus: Parmelia
- Species: P. barrenoae

Binomial name
- Parmelia barrenoae Divakar, M.C.Molina & A.Crespo (2005)

= Parmelia barrenoae =

Species of lichen

Parmelia barrenoae is a species of foliose lichen in the large family Parmeliaceae. It was formally described as a new species in 2005. Before this, it was lumped together as one of several lichens in the Parmelia sulcata group—a species complex of genetically distinct lookalikes. Parmelia barrenoae is widely distributed, occurring in Europe, western North America, Africa, and Asia.

The greenish grey to whitish grey leafy thallus of Parmelia barrenoae grows up to 10 cm (4 in) in diameter. Features of the thallus surface include tiny pores for gas exchange, and vegetative propagules called soralia. The lichen usually grows on tree bark, but is occasionally found on moss-covered rocks in open and sunny places. The lookalike species Parmelia submontana and Parmelia sulcata can be distinguished from Parmelia barrenoae by small differences in morphology. Studies indicate that Parmelia barrenoae is sensitive to air pollution, and it has been proposed for use as an indicator of well conserved and sustainably managed forests.

== Taxonomy ==
The lichen was formally described as a new species in 2005 by Pradeep Divakar, Maria del Carmen Molina, and Ana Crespo. The type specimen was collected from Cruz del Gallo (Navalperal de Tormes, Province of Ávila, Spain) at an altitude of 1,300 m (4,300 ft); here it was found growing on Pyrenean oak. The specific epithet barrenoae honours the Spanish lichenologist Eva Barreno, "in recognition of her numerous contributions to lichenology and of her important contribution in developing Spanish lichenology".

Parmelia barrenoae is morphologically similar to the common and widespread species Parmelia sulcata. Previous molecular investigations indicated a high genetic variability within specimens assigned this name, suggesting the presence of cryptic species. The 2005 study investigated this species complex and showed that specimens that had been previously designated as Parmelia sulcata could be organized into four distinct clades. One of these clades corresponds to the morphotype that was described as the new species. Other members of the P. sulcata species complex are P. fraudans, P. praesquarrosa, P. encryptata, and P. squarrosa. Parmelia barrenoae is thought to have diverged from its closest relatives (P. encryptata and P. squarrosa) during the late Miocene, about 6.3 million years ago.

== Description ==
Parmelia barrenoae has a foliose (leafy) thallus with a tight to loose attachment to its substrate. It measures 5–10 cm (2–4 in) in diameter. The lobes are contiguous to overlapping, with short, rounded tips, measuring 2–7 mm wide. The older lobes tend to curve backwards. The upper surface of the thallus is greenish grey to whitish grey, with a texture that is initially finely foveolate (covered with small pits) before becoming reticulate (net-like) and cracked. The thickness of the thallus is somewhat variable; depending on whether the central areas or the margins are measured, ranging from 200 to 375 μm. Of this, the cortex is 25–37.5 μm thick, the photobiont layer about 30–40 μm thick, the medulla 120–200 μm thick, and the underlying darkened cortex 25–40 μm thick. The latter tissue layer, which gives the thallus underside its blackened colour, is paraplectenchyma—a type of tissue in which the fungal hyphae are oriented in all directions. The photobiont layer of mature specimens is a continuous layer, while in younger specimens it is arranged in discrete aggregations of glomerules (clusters of photobiont cells).

Pseudocyphellae are tiny pores in the cortex that allow for gas exchange through the lichen tissue; these formless holes are numerous in the thallus of Parmelia barrenoae, where they occur on both the thallus surface (i.e., laminal) and along its margins (i.e., marginal). The marginal pseudocyphellae are more or less evenly distributed, while the laminal pseudocyphellae are linear to irregularly shaped and occur mainly on ridges. These pseudocyphellae are separate in the centre but form a network near the periphery of the thallus. Soralia (decorticated regions on the thallus surface where soredia are produced) are sparse, laminal, and develop from old cracked pseudocyphellae. They are linear to irregular in shape, and the soredia (microscopic groups of algal cells and loosely woven hyphae) are granular. The medulla is white. Rhizines on the black lower thallus surface are moderately abundant. They are simple to furcately branched (i.e., forked into two), not squarrose (i.e. with multiple right-angled branches), measuring 1–2 mm long. Neither apothecia nor pycnidia occur in this species. The photobiont partner of the lichen is a green alga from the genus Trebouxia (not identified to species).

The expected results for standard chemical spot tests are as follows: cortex K+ (yellow); medulla K+ (yellow turning red), C−, PD+ (red-orange). Atranorin and salazinic acid are two secondary compounds that occur in the lichen.

=== Similar species ===
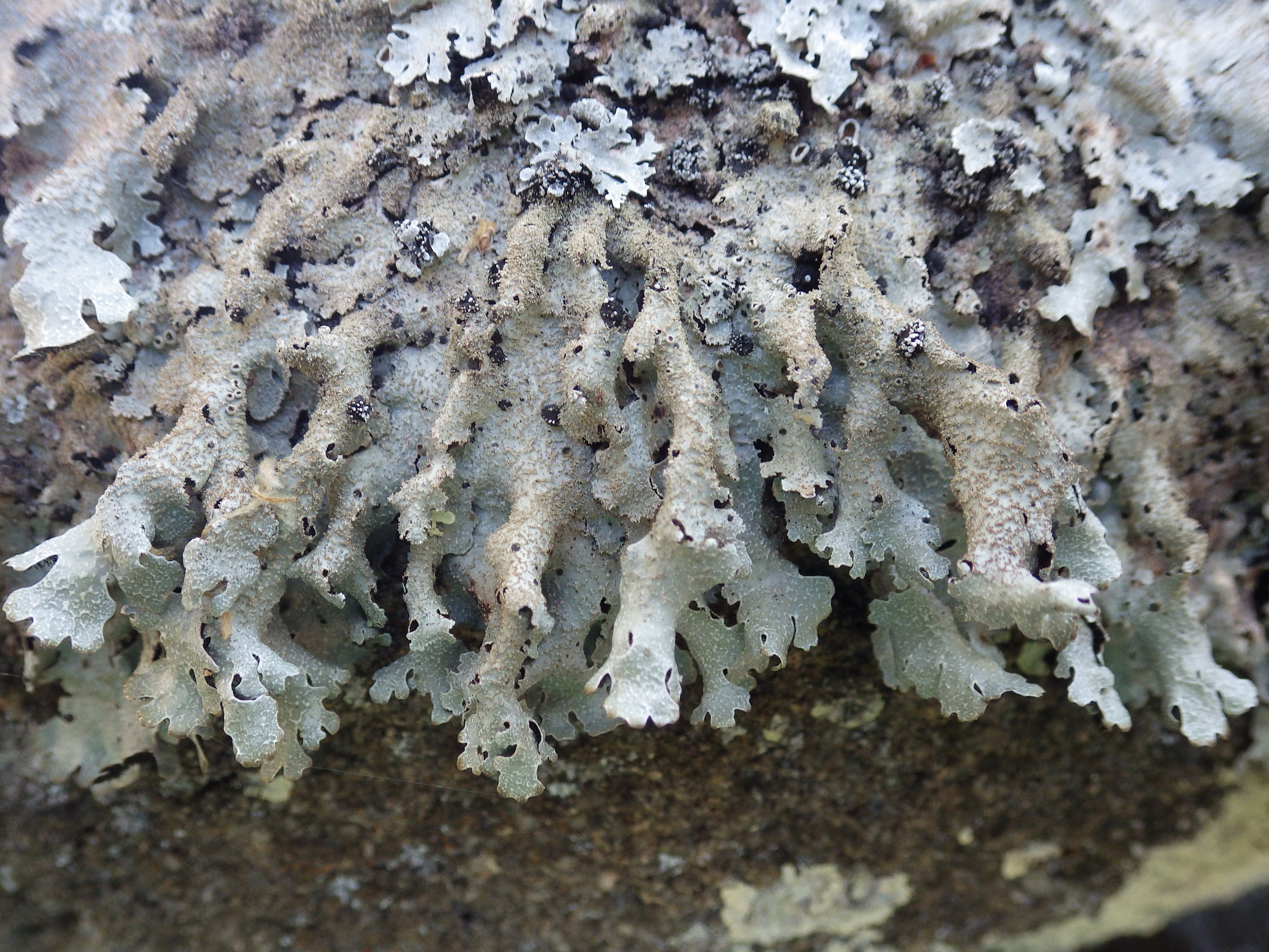
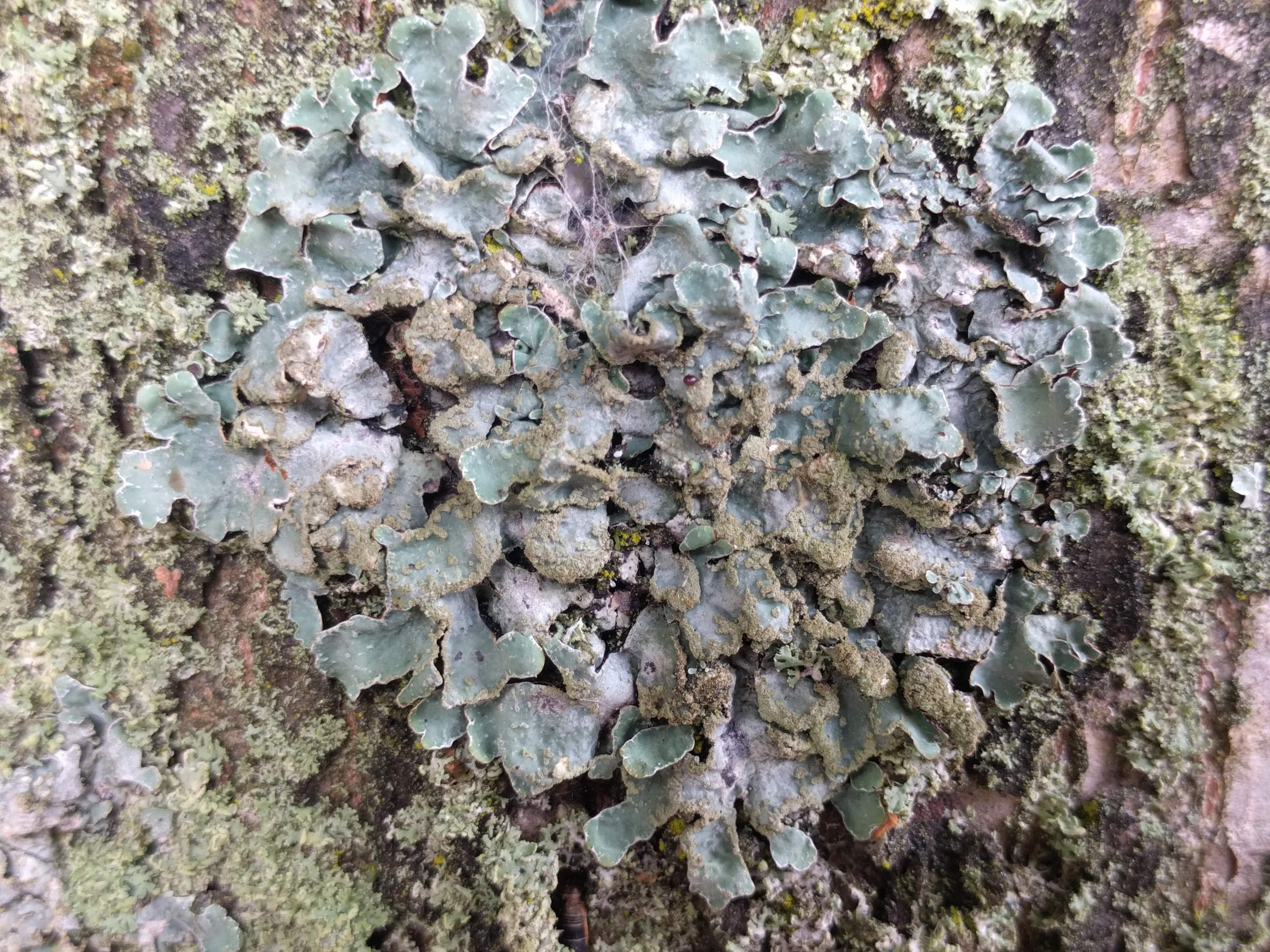
Parmelia submontana (left) and P. sulcata (right) are lookalikes

There are some other Parmelia lichens that are close enough in appearance to P. barrenoae that these species might be confused. For example, the presence of laminal soralia and salazinic acid in P. barrenoae are similar to P. sulcata. However, two major characteristics separate the two species. P. barrenoae has simple, forked rhizines, while P. sulcata has squarrose rhizines that are abundantly branched. Although the differences in rhizine structure is an important distinguishing characteristic, care should be taken when interpreting older specimens (particularly, herbaria specimens), as they may have had squarrose rhizines that degraded over time. Additionally, in P. barrenoae, the pseudocyphellae quickly form marginal and laminar soralia that are less developed than in P. sulcata. The difference in pseudocyphellar structure is a result of differences in the way these structures are formed. In P. barrenoae, the soralia, which originate from linear pseudocyphellae, tend to erode on the margins as they develop, leaving behind patches of lighter-coloured medulla that contrast with the darker cortex. This can contort the thallus, causing the margins to bend. In contrast, the soralia of P. sulcata do not erode and instead accumulate on the margins, and the thallus margin rarely bends.

Parmelia barrenoae could also be confused with P. submontana, since both are sorediate and have simple or furcate rhizines. However, soralia of P. submontana are erect, finger-like and orbicular in shape (isidia-like or pustulated soralia) and its lobes are long, separate and convoluted.

== Habitat and distribution ==
First described from Ávila, and a few years later from the Castellón mountains and Asturias, the geographical range of Parmelia barrenoae has increased expansively as other researchers have reported its occurrence in other locations. In 2010, the lichen was reported to occur in North America and Africa. The North American distribution includes the western United States, based on specimens collected in the states of California, Idaho, Oregon, and Washington. The African distribution includes the Middle Atlas mountain range of Morocco. In 2016, it was reported from Poland, in 2017 from Macedonia, and in 2018 from Turkey and Asia for the first time. In 2021 it was reported to occur in Hungary, Slovakia and Sweden. In some areas its precise range is not yet well known because of historical confusion with P. sulcata.

In the Mediterranean, Parmelia barrenoae is widely distributed on oak bark and conifers. It is occasionally on moss-covered rocks in open and sunny places. The species occurs in Mediterranean areas at moderate altitudes between 800–1,800 m (2,600–5,900 ft). In this region it often co-occurs with Parmelia serrana and various species of Lobaria. In Hungary and Slovakia, the lichen was found in oak-hornbeam and oak forests at elevations between 260 and 500 m (850 and 1,640 ft). In western North America, it tends to occur in xeric conifer or conifer-oak forests at moderate elevations, about 450–2,200 m (1,480–7,220 ft). In Africa its preference for conifer-oak forests at moderate elevations is similar to its habitat in the Mediterranean. Observational studies in the Mediterranean area suggest that Parmelia barrenoae is sensitive to air pollution, as it only appears in forest stands free from direct impacts of pollutants. For this reason, it has been proposed for use as an indicator of well conserved and sustainably managed forests.
