= Symbiosis in lichens =

Schematic cross section of lichen, a symbiosis between green algae and a fungus. 1. Thick layers of hyphae, called the cortex 2. Green algae 3. Loosely packed hyphae 4. Anchoring hyphae called rhizines.

Symbiosis in lichens is the mutually beneficial symbiotic relationship of green algae and/or blue-green algae (cyanobacteria) living among filaments of a fungus, forming lichen.

Living as a symbiont in a lichen appears to be a successful way for a fungus to derive essential nutrients, as about 20% of all fungal species have adopted this mode of life. The autotrophic symbionts occurring in lichens are a wide variety of simple, photosynthetic organisms commonly and traditionally known as “algae”. These symbionts include both prokaryotic and eukaryotic organisms.

== Overview of lichens ==
"Lichens are fungi that have discovered agriculture" — Trevor Goward

A lichen is a combination of fungus and/or algae and/or cyanobacteria that has a very different form (morphology), physiology, and biochemistry than any of the constituent species growing separately. The algae or cyanobacteria benefit their fungal partner by producing organic carbon compounds through photosynthesis. In return, the fungal partner benefits the algae or cyanobacteria by protecting them from the environment by its filaments, which also gather moisture and nutrients from the environment, and (usually) provide an anchor to it.

The majority of the lichens contain eukaryotic autotrophs belonging to the Chlorophyta (green algae) or to the Xanthophyta (yellow-green algae). About 90% of all known lichens have a green alga as a symbiont. Among these, Trebouxia is the most common genus, occurring in about 20% of all lichens. The second most commonly represented green alga genus is Trentepohlia. Overall, about 100 species are known to occur as autotrophs in lichens. All the algae and cyanobacteria are believed to be able to survive separately, as well as within the lichen; that is, at present no algae or cyanobacteria are known which can only survive naturally as part of a lichen. Common algal partners are Trebouxia, Pseudotrebouxia, or Myrmecia.

The prokaryotes belong to the Cyanobacteria, which are often called by their old name “bluegreen algae”. Cyanobacteria occur as symbionts only in about 8% of known lichens. The most commonly occurring genera of symbiotic cyanobacteria are Nostoc and Scytonema.

=== Nomenclature ===
Both the lichen and the fungus partner bear the same scientific name, and the lichens are being integrated into the classification schemes for fungi. Depending on context, the taxonomic name can be meant to refer to the entire lichen, or just the fungus that is part of the lichen.

The alga or cyanobacterium bears its own scientific name, which has no relationship to either the name of the lichen or the fungus.

== Fungus component ==
About 20% of all fungal species are able to form lichens. The fungal partner may be an Ascomycete or Basidiomycete. Overall, about 98% of lichens have an ascomycetous mycobiont. Next to the Ascomycota, the largest number of lichenized fungi occur in the unassigned fungi imperfecti. Comparatively few basidiomycetes are lichenized, but these include agarics, such as species of Lichenomphalia, clavarioid fungi, such as species of Multiclavula, and corticioid fungi, such as species of Dictyonema.

The largest number of lichenized fungi occur in the Ascomycota, with about 40% of species forming such an association. Some of these lichenized fungi occur in orders with nonlichenized fungi that live as saprotrophs or plant parasites (for example, the Leotiales, Dothideales, and Pezizales).

Other lichen fungi occur in only five orders in which all members are engaged in this habit (Orders Graphidales, Gyalectales, Peltigerales, Pertusariales, and Teloschistales). Lichenized and nonlichenized fungi can even be found in the same genus or species.

== Photosynthetic component ==
The photosynthetic component of a lichen is called the photobiont or phycobiont. The layer of tissue containing the cells of the photobiont is called the “photobiontic layer”.

Approximately 100 species of photosynthetic partners from 40 genera and 5 distinct classes (prokaryotic: Cyanophyceae; eukaryotic: Trebouxiophyceae, Phaeophyceae, Chlorophyceae) have been found to associate with the lichen-forming fungi.

A particular fungus species and algal species are not necessarily always associated together in a lichen. One fungus, for example, can form lichens with a variety of different algae. The thalli produced by a given fungal symbiont with its differing partners will be similar, and the secondary metabolites identical, indicating that the fungus has the dominant role in determining the morphology of the lichen. Further, the same algal species can occur in association with different fungal partners. Lichens are known in which there is one fungus associated with two or even three algal species. Rarely, the reverse can occur, and two or more fungal species can interact to form the same lichen.

=== Green algae ===
About 90% of all known lichens have a green alga as a symbiont.

- 'Chlorococcoid' means a green alga (Chlorophyta) that has single cells that are globose, which is common in lichens. This was once placed in the order Chlorococcales, but new DNA data shows many independent lines of evolution exist among this formerly large taxonomic group. Chlorococcales is now a relatively small order and may no longer include any lichen photobionts.
- The term 'Trebouxioid' refers to green algal photobionts similar to those in genus Trebouxia. Taxonomic revisions have moved several photobionts outside of the genus, but mostly still within order Trebouxiales.

=== Cyanolichens ===
Although the photobionts are almost always green algae (Chlorophyta), sometimes the lichen contains Cyanobacteria, taxonomically bacteria, and sometimes both types of photobionts are found in the same lichen.

A cyanolichen is a lichen with a cyanobacterium as its main photosynthetic component (photobiont). Many cyanolichens are small and black, and have limestone as the substrate.

Another cyanolichen group, the jelly lichens (e.g., from the genera Collema or Leptogium) are large and foliose (e.g., species of Peltigera, Lobaria, and Degelia. These lichen species are grey-blue, especially when dampened or wet. Many of these characterize the Lobarion communities of higher rainfall areas in western Britain, e.g., in the Celtic Rainforest.

== Lichenization ==
The process by which the fungus and the photobioant comes together is called "lichenization". There are five steps to this process:

1. The fungus and the alga start in the environment, apart from each other. Each part produces chemical signals to help the other part find it. At this point, the fungus displays increased hyphae branching.
2. The fungus makes initial contact with the alga by growing appressoria and haustoria.
3. The fungus grows hyphae to completely engulf the alga.
4. The alga cell is now incorporated into the lichen. It starts increasing in cell size in response. The hyphae continue growing and swelling.
5. The fungal structure continues differentiating into a full thallus.

Scientists have successfully replicated lichenization in the laboratory; it takes anywhere from a few months to a few years for the isolated fungus and photobiont of a lichen to grow back into a complete thallus. It is unclear how long the process takes in the wild. Throughout lichenization (and after its completion), the fungus and the alga continue to exchange different chemical signals.

== Parasitic fungi ==
Some fungi can only be found living on lichens as obligate parasites; They are not considered part of the lichen. These are referred to as “lichenolous fungi”.

Some of these parasitic lichenolous fungi form their own thalli and become lichen themselves; they are called "lichenicolous lichens". They steal the symbioant of another lichen (kleptosymbiosis) into their own structure (trans-lichenization).
