= Eva Barreno =

Spanish botanist and lichenologist (born 1950)

Eva Barreno Rodríguez
- Born: December 5, 1950 (age 75); Madrid, Spain
- Education: Complutense University of Madrid
- Known for: lichen symbiosis; photobiont diversity; multi-partner associations in Ramalina farinacea
- Scientific career
- Fields: Botany; Lichenology
- Workplaces: Complutense University of Madrid; Autonomous University of Madrid; University of Valencia
- Author abbrev. (botany): Barreno

Eva Barreno Rodríguez (born 5 December 1950) is a Spanish botanist and lichenologist, and emeritus professor of botany at the University of Valencia. She is known for research on lichen symbiosis and photobiont diversity, particularly her demonstrations of multiple coexisting green-algal partners in Ramalina farinacea, as well as for helping to build modern Spanish lichenology. In 2020 the journal Symbiosis issued a Festschrift to mark her seventieth birthday.

== Career and research ==
Barreno was born in Madrid and has longstanding ties to Asturias. As a stand-out biological sciences student at the Complutense University of Madrid (UCM), she approached Salvador Rivas-Martínez in 1972 and joined the Madrid school of geobotany; early colleagues included Ana Crespo, Jesús Izco, Manuel Costa, José Luis Pérez-Cirera and Carlos Arnáiz. She soon gravitated towards lichens and, together with Crespo and Xavier Llimona, broadened the scope of Spanish lichenology.

Her first university posts at the UCM were in the Faculties of Biology (1973–1977) and Pharmacy (from 1977). A short but productive stint at the Autonomous University of Madrid (1983–1985) followed, where she began building a cohort of lichen researchers that included her first doctoral student, Víctor Jiménez Rico. She later took the Chair of Botany at the University of Valencia, where by 2020 she had supervised 16 doctoral theses and 29 undergraduate dissertations.

Early study visits to Hannes Hertel at the Botanische Staatssammlung München honed her approach to difficult lecidioid groups and to collection curation and nomenclature; she subsequently maintained close contact with Josef Poelt and Antonín Vězda. During this 1970s period she published on Spanish lichens, including the description of Buellia follmannii from Madrid's gypsum strata and a floristic–ecological survey of lichens on central Iberian sedimentary rocks; her 1975 doctorate treated terricolous lichens of the Madrid region.

A long-running thread began with Arnoldo Santos Guerra that led to vegetation and bioindication projects in the Canary Islands and to Barreno's broader Macaronesian biogeography work. She has also led extensive collecting campaigns in Spain and abroad; repeated visits (1995–2005) to the United States Forest Service laboratories in Riverside, California fostered collaborations with Patrick J. Temple and Andrzej Bytnerowicz, and she later worked with Thomas H. Nash on the Sonoran Desert flora project.

Her group's work with Ramalina farinacea helped shift thinking about lichen symbiosis from a single-photobiont model to more complex, multi-partner systems. In 2011 they showed that two distinct Trebouxia lineages co-exist within the same thalli and differ in physiological optima, suggesting functional complementarity under changing conditions. Barreno's team subsequently documented rich intrathalline algal diversity, with up to 27 lineages; Trebouxia sp. TR9 and T. jamesii were typically predominant, and the partners showed differing environmental tolerances. The group also sequenced the genome of Trebouxia sp. TR9, explored algal metabolic responses under prolonged high salinity, and reported horizontal transfer of plastid introns among lichenised algae, their fungal partners, and associated bacteria.

Organisation and outreach are recurrent themes: Barreno has organised specialist courses and scientific meetings since 1975, and at Valencia she sponsored Lynn Margulis for the degree of Doctor honoris causa in 2001. Her record by 2020 approached 250 papers (about fifty in top-quartile journals) and an h-index between 25 and 35, depending on database coverage; she has also directed a large portfolio of competitively funded projects (19 national/regional and 10 international or co-financed) and led 17 development/knowledge transfer initiatives.

== Honours and recognition ==
A double issue of the academic journal Symbiosis (vol. 82, 2020) was dedicated as a Festschrift in recognition of Barreno's contributions to lichenology. The lichen Parmelia barrenoae was named in her honour in 2005 "in recognition of her numerous contributions to lichenology" and to the development of Spanish lichenology. Cercidospora barrenoana is another eponym.

== Selected publications ==
- Casano, Leonardo M.; del Campo, Eva M.; García-Breijo, Francisco J.; Reig-Armiñana, José; Gasulla, Francisco; Del Hoyo, Alicia; Guéra, Alfredo; Barreno, Eva (2011). "Two Trebouxia algae with different physiological performances are ever-present in lichen thalli of Ramalina farinacea. Coexistence versus competition?". Environmental Microbiology. 13 (3): 806–818. Bibcode:2011EnvMi..13..806C. doi:10.1111/j.1462-2920.2010.02386.x. hdl:10251/60269. PMID 21134099.
- del Campo, Eva M.; Catalá, Santiago; Gimeno, Jacinta; Del Hoyo, Alicia; Martínez-Alberola, Fernando; Casano, Leonardo M.; Grube, Martin; Barreno, Eva (2013). "The genetic structure of the cosmopolitan three-partner lichen Ramalina farinacea evidences the concerted diversification of symbionts". FEMS Microbiology Ecology. 83 (2): 310–323. Bibcode:2013FEMME..83..310D. doi:10.1111/j.1574-6941.2012.01474.x. PMID 22906221.
- Catalá, Santiago; del Campo, Eva M.; Barreno, Eva; García-Breijo, Francisco J.; Reig-Armiñana, José; Casano, Leonardo M. (2016). "Coordinated ultrastructural and phylogenomic analyses shed light on the hidden phycobiont diversity of Trebouxia microalgae in Ramalina fraxinea". Molecular Phylogenetics and Evolution. 94 (Pt B): 765–777. Bibcode:2016MolPE..94..765C. doi:10.1016/j.ympev.2015.10.021. hdl:10251/64812. PMID 26516030.
- Moya, Patricia; Molins, Arántzazu; Martínez-Alberola, Fernando; Muggia, Lucia; Barreno, Eva (2017). "Unexpected associated microalgal diversity in the lichen Ramalina farinacea is uncovered by pyrosequencing analyses". PLOS ONE. 12 (4) e0175091. Bibcode:2017PLoSO..1275091M. doi:10.1371/journal.pone.0175091. PMC 5392050. PMID 28410402.
- Barreno, Eva; Muggia, Lucia; Chiva, Salvador; Molins, Arántzazu; Bordenave, César; García-Breijo, Francisco; Moya, Patricia (2022). "Trebouxia lynnae sp. nov. (former Trebouxia sp. TR9): Biology and biogeography of an epitome lichen symbiotic microalga". Biology. 11 (8) 1196. doi:10.3390/biology11081196. PMC 9405249. PMID 36009823.
