= Trebouxia arboricola =

Scientific classification
- Kingdom: Plantae
- Division: Chlorophyta
- Class: Trebouxiophyceae
- Order: Trebouxiales
- Family: Trebouxiaceae
- Genus: Trebouxia
- Species: T. arboricola

Binomial name
- Trebouxia arboricola Puymaly, 1924

Synonyms
- Trebouxia humicola G.S.West & F.E.Fritsch, 1927

Species of green alga

Trebouxia arboricola is a symbiotic species of green alga in the family Trebouxiaceae. Described as new to science in 1924, it is usually found in association with different species of lichen-forming fungi and has a broad global distribution.

== Taxonomy ==
The alga was formally described as a new species in 1924 by the French phycologist André Henri Laurent de Puymaly. The type specimen was associated with the foliose lichen Xanthoria parietina. Trebouxia arboricola is the type species of the genus Trebouxia, which was circumscribed by Puymaly in 1924.

In a comprehensive molecular phylogenetics analysis published in 2016, it was discovered that the lichen photobionts Trebouxia arboricola and Trebouxia gigantea constitute a complex clade encompassing 34 distinct operational taxonomic units (OTUs). This finding suggests that what is currently known as T. arboricola and T. gigantea may actually represent a group of 34 potentially distinct species, each with its unique genetic identity.

== Distribution ==
Trebouxia arboricola has a wide global distribution. It has been reported in the Arctic and Atlantic Islands, including Iceland. In Europe, its presence spans across Britain, France, Germany, Romania, Russia (European regions), Spain, Switzerland, Ukraine, and the Ural Mountains. In South America, the species is found in Argentina. The Middle East records include Israel, while in South-west Asia, it has been reported from Uttar Pradesh. Its Asian distribution covers China and Taiwan. Under the synonym Trebouxia humicola, the species was recorded in Europe and Asia.

== Ecology ==
In a study of bark-inhabiting lichens from the Physcietum adscendentis sociological unit (a set of lichen taxa that commonly associate together), researchers identified Trebouxia arboricola as the photobiont in several lichen species. This identification was achieved through axenic cultures and sequence comparisons of internal transcribed spacer DNA. Trebouxia arboricola was found in association with Lecania cyrtella, Candelaria concolor, Candelariella cf. reflexa, Lecanora species, Lecidella elaeochroma, in addition to Xanthoria parietina. The study also suggested the existence of a free-living population of Trebouxia arboricola, based on its frequent occurrence as a photobiont in pioneer lichens growing on smooth bark. Additionally, it was observed that the photobionts from Xanthoria parietina were morphologically and genetically distinct from those in Physcia adscendens and Phaeophyscia orbicularis. In a 2013 study, researchers found that Xanthoria parietina from various locations in France and Switzerland associates with diverse genotypes of Trebouxia decolorans, while saxicolous (rock-dwelling) specimens specifically associate with Trebouxia arboricola.

Oribatid mites inhabiting the lichen Xanthoria parietina were found in one study to aid in the dispersal of the lichen's photobiont, Trebouxia arboricola, through their faeces, suggesting a potential method for the vegetative dispersal of this alga.

Trebouxia arboricola was studied as part of the first investigation of aerophytic (i.e., deriving moisture and nutrients from the air and rain) cryptogams on monuments in Bulgaria. In Koprivshtitsa, the alga was found in both free-living and lichenised states on granite monuments, alongside other green algae like Apatococcus lobatus. Culture studies confirmed the presence of T. arboricola, providing the first documented evidence of its occurrence in Bulgaria in a free-living (non-lichenised) state.

== Preservation and longevity ==
Research on the Xanthoria parietina and Trebouxia arboricola showed that both organisms die off after about 3 years of room temperature storage, evident from colour changes and a decrease in chlorophyll fluorescence in Trebouxia cells. When stored desiccated at −20 °C (−4 °F), both the fungus and T. arboricola remained viable for up to 13 years, showing the effectiveness of cryopreservation for long-term storage of viable lichen thalli, including T. arboricola, for experimental studies.

The predominance of Trebouxia arboricola in areas with different levels of carbon monoxide (CO) in Peninsular Malaysia suggests that this species is resilient to air pollution. Its widespread presence and ability to thrive in varying CO concentrations make it a potential candidate for monitoring air quality, as changes in its population density could indicate alterations in air pollution levels.
