= Trebouxia flava =

Scientific classification
- Kingdom: Plantae
- Division: Chlorophyta
- Class: Trebouxiophyceae
- Order: Trebouxiales
- Family: Trebouxiaceae
- Genus: Trebouxia
- Species: T. flava

Binomial name
- Trebouxia flava Archibald, 1975

Species of green alga

Trebouxia flava is a species of green alga in the family Trebouxiaceae. First described in 1975 by Patricia Ann Archibald, it features spherical cells containing multiple nuclei and a single chloroplast with a small pyrenoid. The species is characterized by its distinctive dull-shiny, sulphurous yellow cultures, which differ from the typical shiny yellow-green appearance of most other Trebouxia species. It can reproduce both through motile zoospores and non-motile aplanospores, and was originally isolated from the foliose lichen species Physconia pulverulenta.

== Taxonomy ==
The alga was formally described as a new species in 1975 by the American biologist Patricia Ann Archibald. The type specimen was originally isolated (as Cystococcus humicola) from the foliose lichen now known as Physconia pulverulenta, and it is preserved in the Indiana Culture Collection under the accession number 181. The species epithet, flava, is Latin for "yellow".

== Description ==
In active (logarithmic) growth, the vegetative cells of Trebouxia flava are spherical and measure approximately 7–15 micrometers (μm) in diameter, with a typical size of about 10 μm. The cell walls are relatively thin, around 0.5 μm or less in thickness. Unlike some other algae, T. flava cells do not become significantly larger or develop thicker cell walls when entering stationary (non-growing) phases in culture. Unlike most cultures of Trebouxia algae, which are shiny and yellow-green, cultures of T. flava are dull-shiny with a sulphurous yellow color.

Each cell contains a single chloroplast equipped with a very small and often difficult-to-distinguish pyrenoid—a structure involved in carbon fixation. The cells are multinucleate, meaning they contain multiple nuclei rather than just one.

Originally isolated from Physconia pulverulenta, this alga has also been found to associate with the lichens Physconia distorta and P. grisea. Trebouxia flava is one of several Trebouxia species known to form symbiotic relationships with lichens in the genus Parmelia, specifically associating with species in the Parmelia sulcata group. Research has shown that P. sulcata group lichens display high specificity in their symbiotic relationships, associating only with Trebouxia species from clade I, including T. flava, whereas other Parmelia groups associate with different Trebouxia clades.

== Reproduction ==
Trebouxia flava reproduces both by zoospore s (motile spores) and aplanospores (non-motile spores). The zoospores are relatively small, about 3 μm wide by 7 μm long. They contain a single nucleus positioned toward their anterior (front) end, as well as a minute stigma (eye-spot) also located near the front. This stigma likely helps the zoospore orient itself toward light, a crucial factor for photosynthesis. Aplanospores, on the other hand, lack motility and rely on passive dispersal.
