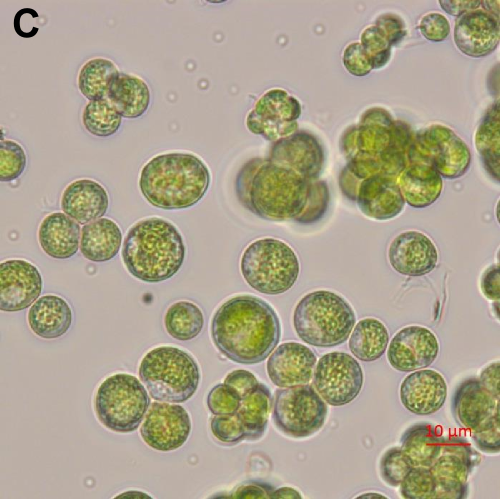
- Lobosphaera incisa

Scientific classification
- Clade: Viridiplantae
- Division: Chlorophyta
- Class: Trebouxiophyceae
- Order: Trebouxiales
- Family: Trebouxiaceae
- Genus: Lobosphaera
- Species: L. incisa

Binomial name
- Lobosphaera incisa (Reisigl) Karsten, Friedl, Schumannn, Hoyer & Lembcke

Synonyms
- Myrmecia incisa Reisigl; Parietochloris incisa (Reisigl) Shin Watanabe

= Lobosphaera incisa =

Species of alga

Lobosphaera incisa, formerly Parietochloris incisa, is a fresh-water green algae. It is the richest plant source of the PUFA arachidonic acid.
