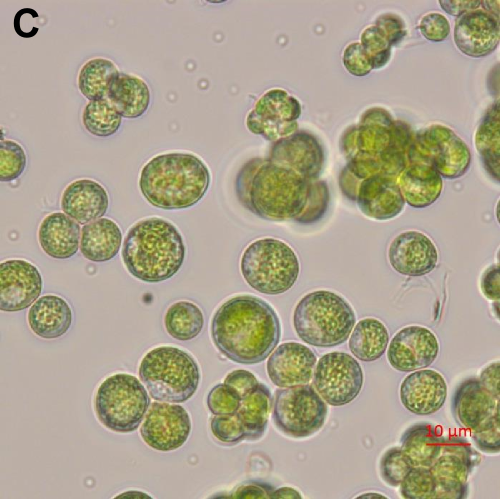
- Lobosphaera incisa

Scientific classification
- Kingdom: Plantae
- Division: Chlorophyta
- Class: Trebouxiophyceae
- Order: Trebouxiales
- Family: Trebouxiaceae
- Genus: Lobosphaera; Reisigl

Type species
- Lobosphaera tirolensis Reisigl

Species
- Lobosphaera incisa; Lobosphaera tirolensis; Lobosphaera undulata

= Lobosphaera =

Genus of algae

Lobosphaera is a genus of green algae in the family Trebouxiaceae. It was originally described from soils in Austria, but has since been found in freshwater habitats and as a symbiont within lichens.

Lobosphaera consists of solitary, spherical cells around 15 μm in diameter, surrounded by a thin cell wall. Cells contain a single chloroplast that is parietal with marginal indentations. Chloroplasts lack pyrenoids but have starch grains. Reproduction is asexual and occurs by the formation of 4-32 autospores; these are released by the rupture of the parental cell wall. Species in the genus Lobosphaera have also been placed in Myrmecia.
