= Trochisciopsis =

Scientific classification
- Clade: Viridiplantae
- Division: Chlorophyta
- Class: Trebouxiophyceae
- Order: Trebouxiales
- Family: Trebouxiaceae
- Genus: Trochisciopsis; G. Vinatzer, 1975

Type species
- Trochisciopsis tetraspora

Species
- Trochisciopsis insignis; Trochisciopsis tetraspora

Genus of algae

Trochisciopsis is a genus of green algae, in the family Trebouxiaceae.
