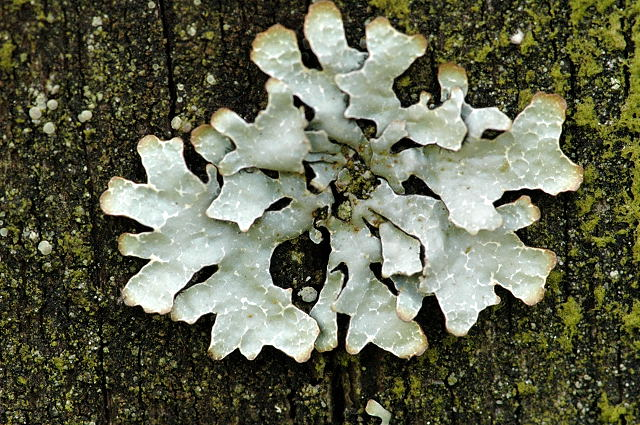

Conservation status
- Secure (NatureServe)

Scientific classification
- Kingdom: Fungi
- Division: Ascomycota
- Class: Lecanoromycetes
- Order: Lecanorales
- Family: Parmeliaceae
- Genus: Parmelia
- Species: P. sulcata

Binomial name
- Parmelia sulcata Taylor (1836)

Synonyms
- List: Parmelia saxatilis var. leucochroa Wallr. (1831); Parmelia saxatilis var. sulcata (Taylor) Linds. (1859); Parmelia sulcata var. laevis Nyl. (1860); Imbricaria saxatilis f. sulcata (Taylor) Anzi (1866); Imbricaria saxatilis var. sulcata (Taylor) Anzi (1866); Parmelia saxatilis subsp. sulcata (Taylor) Nyl. (1876); Parmelia saxatilis f. sulcata (Taylor) Tuck. (1882); Parmotrema sulcata Choisy (1952); Parmotrema sulcatum Choisy (1952)

= Parmelia sulcata =

Species of lichen-forming fungus

Parmelia sulcata, commonly known as the hammered shield lichen or cracked-shield lichen, is a foliose lichen in the family Parmeliaceae. First described by Thomas Taylor in 1836, it is one of the most prevalent lichen species globally, known for its resilience to pollution and cosmopolitan distribution across temperate and cold regions of both hemispheres. P. sulcata forms a circular thallus up to 10 cm (4 in) in diameter, with a glaucous white to grey upper surface and a black lower surface, featuring broadly lobed structures with both marginal and laminal soralia and a distinctive reticulate pattern of pseudocyphellae.

Taxonomically, Parmelia sulcata has a complex history. Molecular phylogenetics studies have revealed significant genetic variability within what was traditionally considered a single species, identifying a complex of cryptic species, including Parmelia encryptata and P. barrenoae, and demonstrate the necessity of molecular data for accurate species identification. P. sulcata maintains a highly specific symbiotic relationship with green algae of the genus Trebouxia, particularly species within Trebouxia clade I, as its photobiont partner.

Ecologically, Parmelia sulcata grows on various substrates, including bark, wood, and rocks. It accumulates pollutants such as heavy metals and radionuclides, reflecting air quality and contamination levels, making it a useful bioindicator in pollution studies across Europe, North America, and other regions. Beyond its ecological importance, P. sulcata has been used in traditional medicine and as a source of natural dyes.

== Systematics ==
=== Historical taxonomy ===
Parmelia sulcata was first described by Thomas Taylor in 1836 under its current name. Taylor characterised its thallus as orbicular and stellate, with a glaucous (dull grayish-green) white colour when dry and a glaucous green colour when wet, and a dark brown underside with black fibres. He described the lobes as incised, somewhat concave, and reticulated with elevated ridges. The thallus features oblong or linear eruptions consisting of a fine greyish-brown powder. Apothecia are central and substipitate, with a brown disk and a smooth or powdery exterior. Taylor noted that Parmelia sulcata was distinct from Parmelia saxatilis, being larger, whiter, less imbricated, more concave, and more green when wet. He also highlighted that the species is more common on rocks in County Kerry than on trees and could attain a diameter of a foot or more. Taylor mentioned that it had been previously mistaken for Parmelia conspersa (now in Xanthoparmelia) in some plant lists. Parmelia sulcata has a large number of named varieties and forms, but no subspecies despite its extensive range. Most taxonomists have left the species in the genus to which Taylor originally assigned it, though the mycologist Maurice Choisy assigned it to the genus Parmotrema in 1952.

In 1962, Mason Hale and Syo Kurokawa designated a specimen from Lough Bray, County Kerry, as the lectotype for Parmelia sulcata. This specimen, collected by Taylor in 1812 and housed in the Farlow Herbarium of Cryptogamic Botany, was supported by Taylor's own notes, confirming its identification. Despite attempts to extract DNA from the original lectotype, no viable DNA was obtained, leading to the selection of an epitype from a specimen collected near the original type locality in County Kerry in 2006. This epitype helps stabilize the application of the name Parmelia sulcata in both molecular and morphological studies.

=== Molecular studies ===
Molecular phylogenetics studies revealed significant genetic variability within Parmelia sulcata, indicating that it is a complex of cryptic species. Molina and colleagues (2011) used three molecular markers: nuclear internal transcribed spacer, abbreviated as nuITS; nuclear intergenic spacer rDNA, abbreviated as nuIGS; and partial β-tubulin gene to study the biodiversity of P. sulcata across four continents. They identified two monophyletic groups: Parmelia sulcata sensu stricto ("in the strict sense") and a new cryptic species named Parmelia encryptata. The study highlighted that P. sulcata as traditionally circumscribed did not form a monophyletic group. The researchers found that specimens initially identified as P. sulcata based on morphological characters did not cluster together in phylogenetic analyses. Instead, they formed distinct, well-supported clades, indicating the presence of multiple cryptic species within what was previously thought to be a single species. P. encryptata was described as morphologically similar to P. sulcata but genetically distinct, with a unique insertion in the internal transcribed spacer region and specific nucleotide differences. Another member of this complex, the widely distributed Parmelia barrenoae, was recognised as a distinct species in 2005.

=== Naming ===
The genus name Parmelia is a compound of two Greek words: parme, meaning 'fruit bowl' and -eileo, meaning 'enclosed'. This likely refers to the lecanorine apothecia of species belonging to the genus. The specific epithet sulcata is derived from sulcatus, meaning "grooved" or "furrowed". The species is known by a number of colloquial names, including hammered shield lichen, cracked-shield lichen, powdered crottle, furrowed shield lichen, powdered shield, and waxpaper lichen.

== Description ==
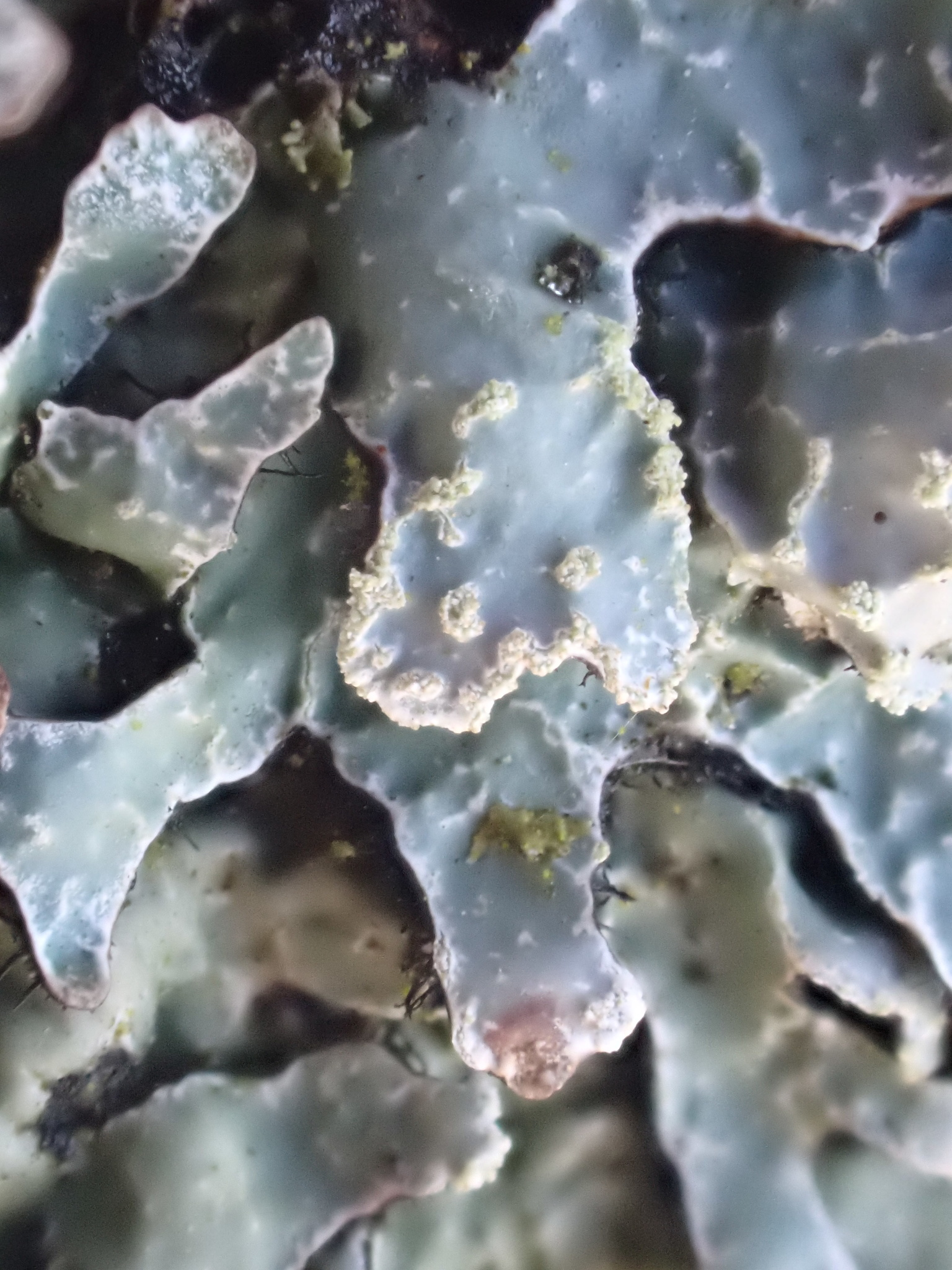
Closeup of lobe with both laminal and marginal soralia

Parmelia sulcata is a foliose lichen with a generally circular thallus that can range in color from glaucous white to gray on the upper cortex; the lower surface is black. The thallus is broadly lobed. The thallus, loosely attached to its substrate, is typically up to 6 cm (2 3/8 in), although diameters up to 10 cm (4 in) have been recorded. Each lobe measures between 2–5 mm (1/16–3/16 in) in width, and lobes are overlapping. The lobes, which are more or less linear, have both marginal and laminal soralia. Also present on both laminal and marginal regions of the lobes are elongated pseudocyphellae—small pores in the cortex—that form a reticulate pattern. Rhizines on the thallus underside are simple (unbranched) to squarrose (brush-like). Apothecia (fruiting bodies) are rare in this species. If present, they are up to 8 mm (5/16 in) in diameter and lecanorine in form, with a red-brown disc; they often have a sorediate margin. Reproduction in P. sulcata occurs predominantly asexually through soredia, although apothecia are not exceptionally rare in rural areas. Ascospores measure 8–14 μm.

In terms of standard spot tests, the upper surface of Parmelia sulcata reacts K+ (yellow), KC−, C−, and P−, indicating the presence of the secondary metabolites (lichen products) atranorin and chloroatranorin. The lichen's medulla and soredia are K+ (red-orange) and Pd+ (orange). The lichen does not fluoresce in ultraviolet light. Salazinic acid and consalazinic acid are present in the medulla; lobaric acid is variably present.

== Photobiont ==
The photobiont, or photosynthetic partner, of Parmelia sulcata is primarily the green microalga Trebouxia. A 2021 study by Moya and colleagues shed light on the diversity and specificity of Trebouxia species associated with P. sulcata. Trebouxia is one of the most frequent lichen symbionts, associating with over 7,000 species of lichen-forming fungi worldwide. The study analyzed 159 thalli from 30 locations, including samples of P. sulcata. It was found that P. sulcata associates primarily with three Trebouxia lineages: Trebouxia sp. I02, T. flava, and Trebouxia aff. flava (a taxon closely related to, but not identical to, T. flava). This specificity suggests a close co-evolutionary relationship between Parmelia sulcata and its photobiont.

Phylogenetic analyses revealed that while some Parmelia species can associate with multiple Trebouxia species, P. sulcata maintains a more specialised relationship with fewer Trebouxia lineages. This high specificity could be related to the lichen's ecological strategies and vegetative structures. Parmelia sulcata reproduces vegetatively through soredia, which contain both fungal and algal cells, potentially influencing the selection of compatible photobionts. Overall, the study suggests that the biodiversity patterns of photobionts in Parmelia are influenced by a combination of ecological, climatic, and evolutionary factors.

== Similar species ==
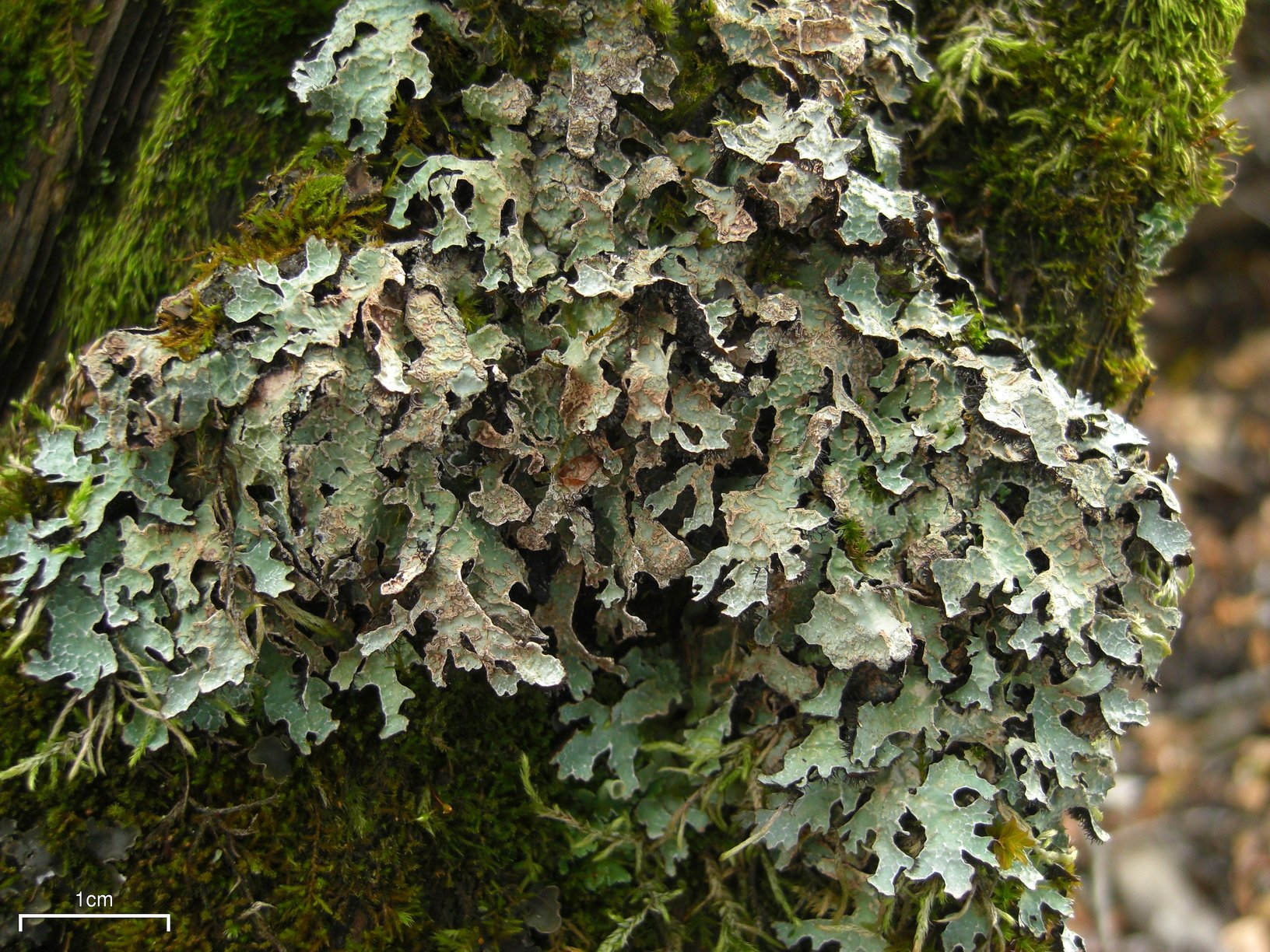
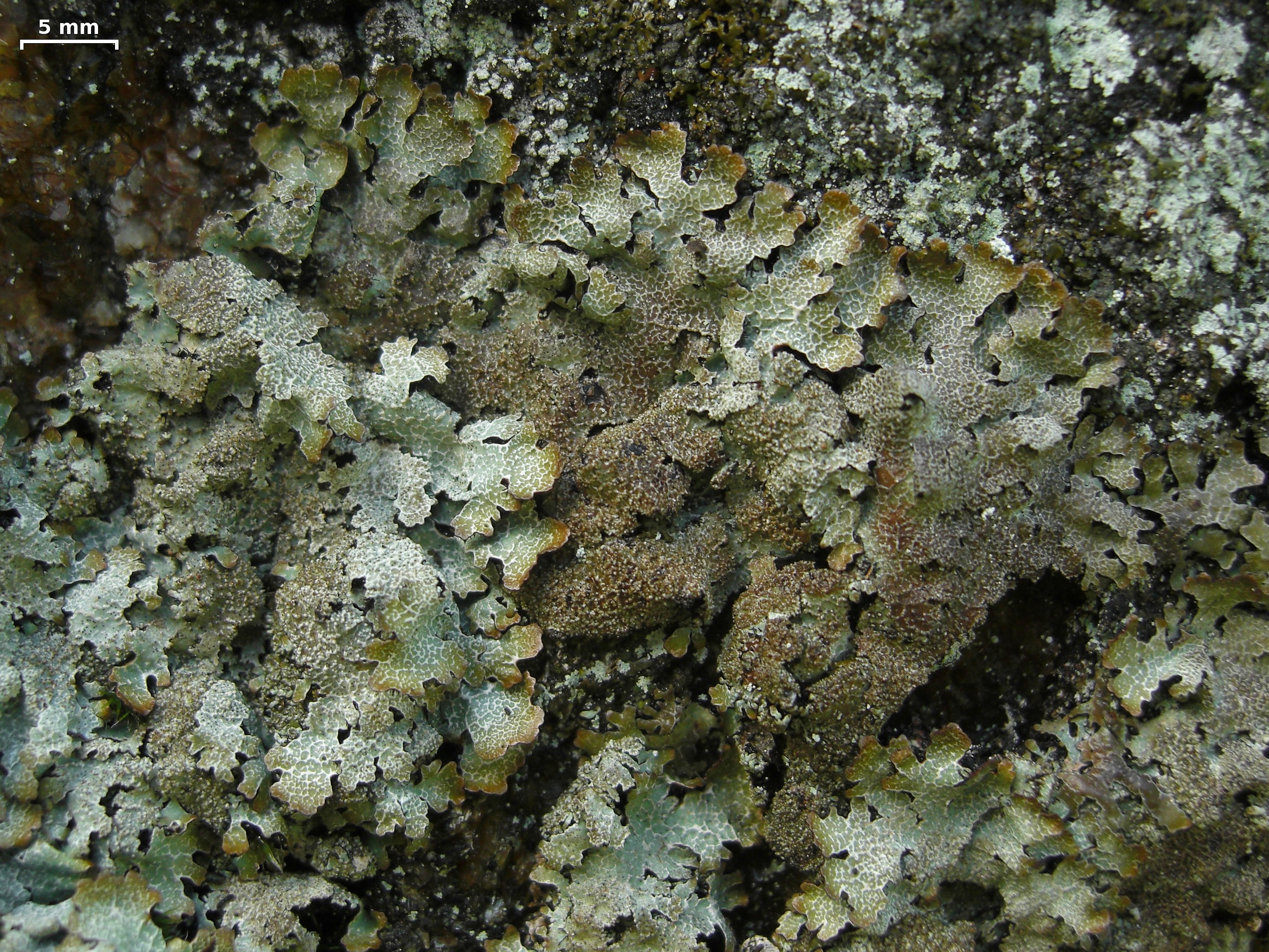
Parmelia barrenoae (left) and P. saxatilis (right) are potential lookalikes of P. sulcata.

Parmelia sulcata has several morphologically and chemically similar species that can be challenging to distinguish without detailed examination and molecular data. These species include Parmelia barrenoae, Parmelia encryptata, and Parmelia asiatica. Identifying Parmelia sulcata and its similar species based solely on morphology and chemistry can be challenging due to overlapping characteristics and intraspecific variability. DNA-based methods are essential tools to help distinguish between cryptic species like P. encryptata and near-cryptic species such as P. asiatica and P. barrenoae. Understanding these differences enables researchers and lichenologists to better identify and study Parmelia sulcata and its closely related species, contributing to more accurate distribution records and ecological knowledge.

Parmelia barrenoae can be distinguished by its broad and overlapping lobes. The soralia are laminal, appearing as fissures in the upper cortex. The rhizines of P. barrenoae are simple to furcate. While both P. barrenoae and P. sulcata contain salazinic acid, the physical arrangement and appearance of lobes and soralia are distinguishing features.

Parmelia encryptata is a cryptic species that is morphologically identical to P. sulcata. It is characterised by sublinear lobes with marginal and laminal, elongated pseudocyphellae, and soralia on the upper surface. The rhizines are typically simple to squarrose, predominantly simple in the central part of the thallus. Identification of P. encryptata requires molecular data, specifically nucITS rDNA sequences, to distinguish it from P. sulcata.

Parmelia asiatica is distinguished by its predominantly circular and semicircular, terminal, or marginal soralia, and narrow sublinear lobes. Like P. sulcata, P. asiatica has simple to squarrose rhizines but differs in the shape and distribution of its soralia. Both species have salazinic acid in the medulla, but the unique characteristics of P. asiatica's soralia and lobes provide a visual distinction.

== Distribution and habitat ==
Parmelia sulcata is a common species throughout much of the world, found from temperate to cold regions of both the Northern and Southern Hemispheres. Its northern North American distribution has been described as "extremely widespread, even weedy", and includes Mexico's Baja California. It is one of the most common parmelioid lichens in Europe, having been recorded in 43 countries there. It has been found to reappear in urban areas after sulphur dioxide levels have decreased. Although common in the Northern Hemisphere, Parmelia sulcata is rare in South America. A 2023 study provided molecular evidence for its presence in Chile, and showed that DNA sequences from Chile belong to the most common haplotype found in Europe, Asia, and North America, indicating a widespread distribution of this haplotype. In Nepal, Parmelia sulcata has been reported from 3,000 to 3,366 m elevation in a compilation of published records. In Africa, Parmelia sulcata has been documented from the low alpine zone in Ethiopia and Kenya, at elevations ranging from 3,500 to 4,200 m (11,500 to 13,800 ft), but it is otherwise rare.

Although most common on bark and on wood, Parmelia sulcata also grows on rocks or mossy rocks. In a study of the distribution of epiphytic lichens, including Parmelia sulcata, along tree trunks in a temperate continental climate, it was found to be most abundant in the middle to upper parts of tree trunks, particularly in areas with higher light levels. This distribution pattern suggests that light conditions are a significant factor influencing the growth and distribution of Parmelia sulcata.

== Ecology ==
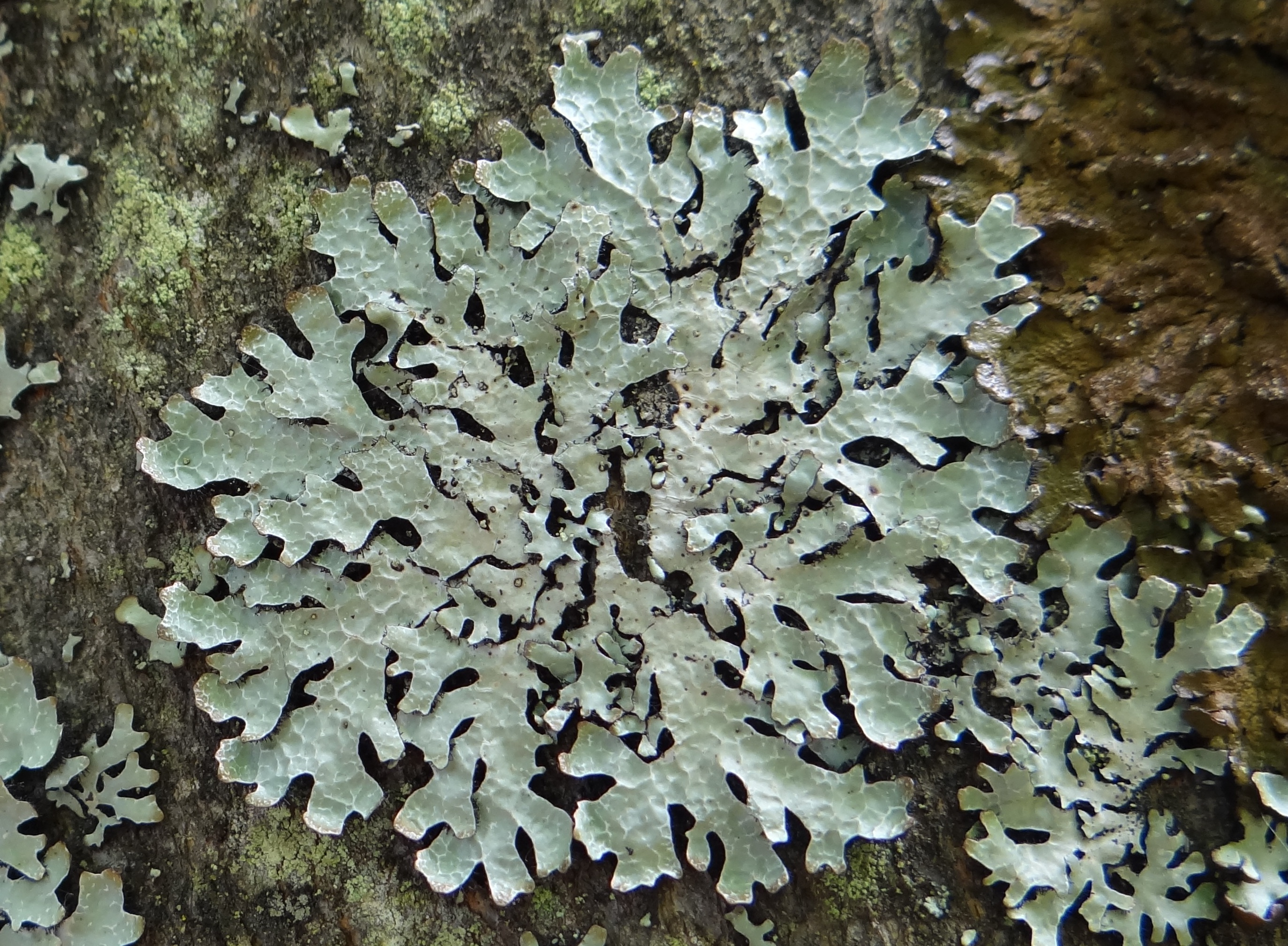
In the Tatra Mountains, Poland

The vertical zonality of Parmelia sulcata along tree trunks is influenced by various microclimatic conditions such as humidity, light conditions, and the chemical and physical properties of the bark. Parmelia sulcata, along with other lichen species, contributes to the high diversity of lichen biota in the lower and upper parts of tree trunks. The species composition of lichens, including Parmelia sulcata, changes from the base to the crown of the trees, indicating the importance of light conditions in their distribution. For instance, in a Russian study, Parmelia sulcata was commonly found at heights of 10–20 m (33–66 ft) on birch trees and around 15 m (49 ft) and in the crown on spruce trees, reflecting its preference for higher insolation levels (i.e., areas that receive more sunlight or solar radiation) in these zones.

A study conducted in a temperate deciduous forest of Central Italy monitored carbon dioxide (CO_{2}) gas exchange, radial growth, chlorophyll content, and photobiont density of Parmelia sulcata over a year. The results showed significant seasonal variations, with CO_{2} gas exchange and radial growth peaking in December, and photoinhibition occurring in early spring before tree leaves sprouted. Photobiont density was highest in June and December and lowest in April. These findings suggest that the seasonal acclimation of lichen photosynthesis and chlorophyll content is influenced by variations in photobiont population density, potentially related to changes in nutrient availability.

Lichenoconium edgewoodense and Nanostictis caucasica are two species of lichenicolous (lichen-dwelling) fungi that have been recorded exclusively parasitising Parmelia barrenoae, although it is also susceptible to other species of parasitic fungi that more broadly target genus Parmelia, such as Arthophacopsis parmeliarum or Abrothallus parmeliarum. Another fungus that appears to be obligately parasitic on P. sulcata, Perigrapha superveniens, causes the formation of irregularly shaped to undulate (wavy edged) galls, and prefers its host to live in oceanic areas.

== Uses ==
=== Dyestuff ===
This species can be used to make a natural dye, producing a reddish-brown colour. Its use as a dyestuff has a long history in Scotland, where lichens of genus Parmelia were traditionally known as "crotal" (from Gaelic crotal), with P. saxatalis being called "light crotal" and related species P. omphalodes being known as "dark crotal". The traditional Highland dyeing method involved alternating layers of lichen and wool in a dyeing vessel, covered with water and boiled until the desired depth of colour was achieved. While this produced strong, permanent colours, the continuous boiling could damage the wool fibres. Later methods solved this by first boiling the crotal alone to extract the colour, then adding the wool at a lower temperature to prevent tangling and damage.

=== Traditional medicine ===
In Canada, the Métis peoples rubbed it on the gums of teething babies, while the Saanich peoples used it as a folk medicine.

=== Environmental monitoring ===
Parmelia sulcata has been extensively studied for its capacity to monitor environmental pollution due to its sensitivity to air quality changes. As a species sensitive to air quality changes, its presence or absence can indicate pollution levels, particularly in industrial areas, urban settings, and natural habitats. It has been observed to reappear in areas where sulfur dioxide levels have decreased, making it a useful bioindicator of improving air conditions.

Additionally, P. sulcata can accumulate and concentrate various pollutants in its tissues, allowing researchers to quantify contamination levels. Studies have used it to monitor heavy metals in industrial areas and persistent polycyclic aromatic hydrocarbon pollution in the Pyrenees. Its ability to accumulate radionuclides has also made it valuable for measuring radioactive pollutants, with researchers analysing the concentrations of radionuclides in the lichen's tissues to assess environmental pollution levels in affected areas.
