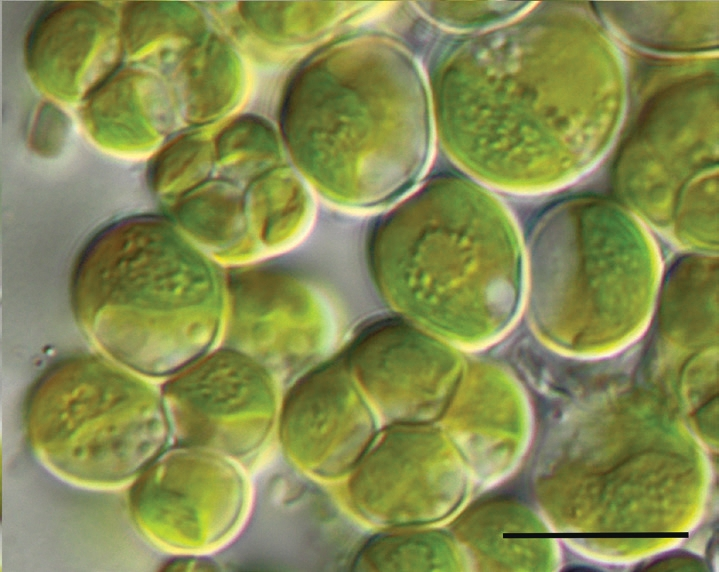

Scientific classification
- Kingdom: Plantae
- Division: Chlorophyta
- Class: Trebouxiophyceae
- Order: Trebouxiales
- Family: Trebouxiaceae
- Genus: Parietochloris; Shin Watanabe & G.L.Floyd

Species
- Parietochloris pseudoalveolaris

= Parietochloris =

Genus of algae

Parietochloris is a genus of green algae in the family Trebouxiaceae.
