= Salvador Rivas-Martínez =

Spanish botanist and geobotanist (1935–2020)

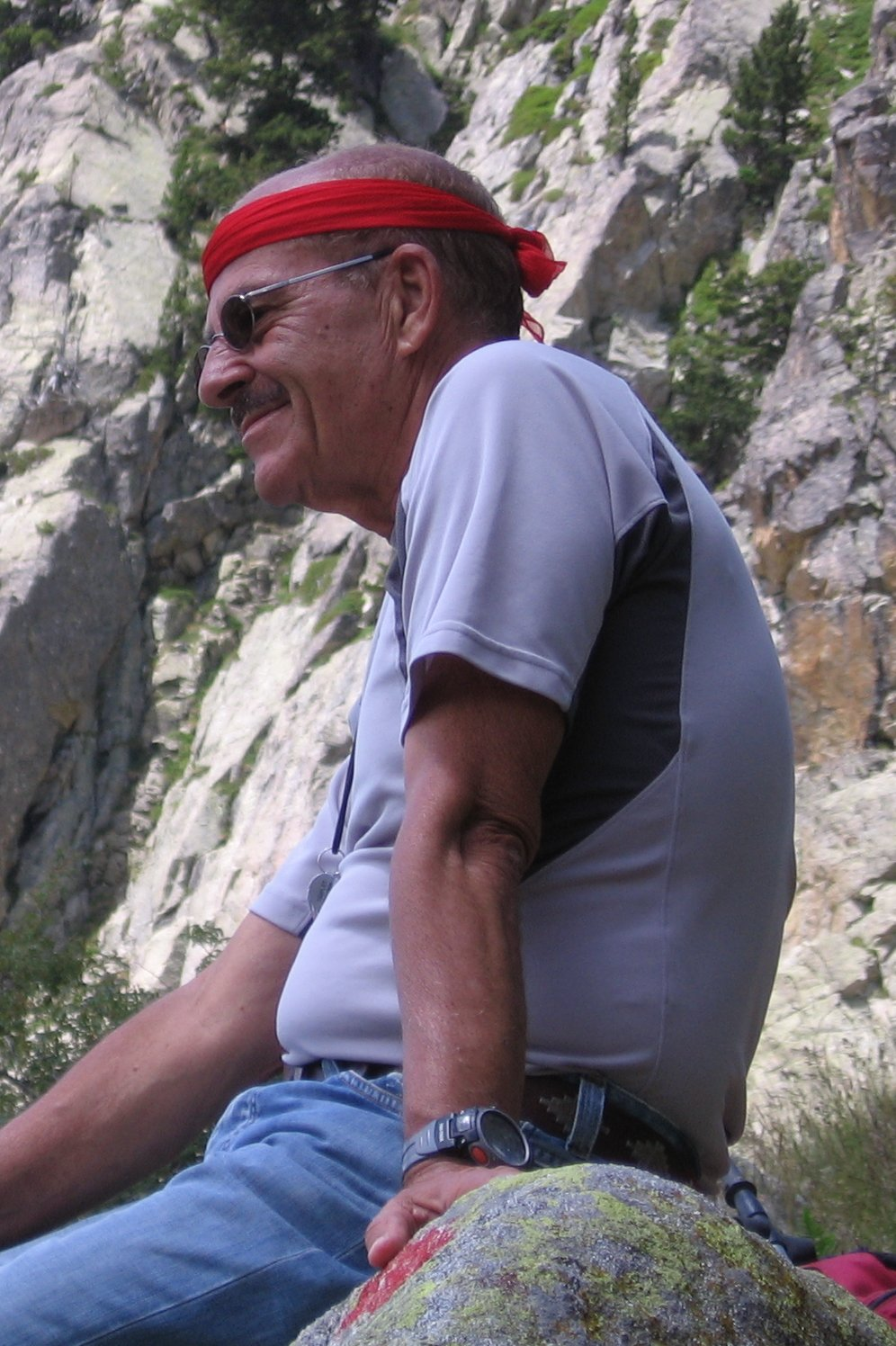
- In the Spanish Pyrenees in 2007
- Born: July 16, 1935; Madrid, Spain
- Died: August 27, 2020 (aged 85); Rivas-Vaciamadrid, Spain
- Known for: Vegetation series and dynamic concepts of vegetation; bioclimatology and biogeography of vegetation; conservation-centred approach to biodiversity and ecosystem function
- Scientific career
- Fields: botany, geobotany, phytosociology
- Institutions: Complutense University of Madrid
- Author abbrev. (botany): Rivas Mart.

Salvador Rivas-Martínez (16 July 1935 – 27 August 2020) was a Spanish botanist and geobotanist, long associated with the Complutense University of Madrid. He was a leading figure in Iberian and Mediterranean vegetation science, known for work on vegetation series, bioclimatology, and biogeography, and for promoting conservation-oriented interpretations of plant communities.

== Biography ==
Rivas-Martínez came from a family of botanists: his father, Salvador Rivas Goday, and his grandfather, Marcelo Rivas Mateos, were professors of botany at the Complutense University. As a child he accompanied his father on field trips around Spain during the 1940s and 1950s, building an intimate knowledge of the Iberian flora that underpinned his later career. Rivas-Martínez earned a doctorate in pharmacy in 1961 (after a 1958 licentiate) and a later licentiate in Biological Sciences in 1967; he won the botany chair at the University of Barcelona at age 29 and later moved to the Complutense University of Madrid, where he headed botany and served as vice-rector for research (1980–1983). He also sat on the Council of Europe expert groups dealing with vegetation mapping and conservation. He held senior posts in Spain's scientific institutions, including directing the Real Jardín Botánico (CSIC) from 1974 to 1978, in parallel with field-led programmes that trained a generation of Spanish geobotanists.

He fostered a collaborative network among Spanish and European botanists, helping to establish the Spanish Association of Phytosociology (Asociación Española de Fitosociología), its annual phytosociology conference, and field excursions such as Itinera Geobotanica. A frequent traveller, he studied vegetation across Spain, Europe, the Mediterranean, and the Americas, as well as parts of East Asia, always with an emphasis on comparable community patterns under environmental controls.

== Work and editorial activity ==
Rivas-Martínez articulated a dynamic view of vegetation organised into series and published a national vegetation series map of Spain that became a reference for terrestrial ecosystems. He integrated bioclimatology with vegetation classification and produced widely used bioclimatic and biogeographic maps for multiple regions. From early in his career he argued for conservation as a scientific priority, linking biodiversity patterns to ecosystem function. Although centred on vascular plant vegetation, he supported cryptogamic disciplines including bryology, mycology, lichenology and phycology. His national "Memoria del mapa de series de vegetación de España" (1:400,000) synthesised vegetation series across Spain (synthesised in 1981 and revised in 1987) and remains a reference framework used by governmental mapping programmes. Together with Paloma Cantó, Rivas-Martínez edited and distributed the exsiccata work Exsiccata Rivasgodayana (1991).

He founded or co-founded several periodicals, beginning with Lazaroa (renamed Mediterranean Botany), where he served for years as editor-in-chief alongside editorial secretary Eva Barreno. Other titles included Itinera Geobotanica, Global Geobotany and the International Journal of Geobotanical Research (with Ángel Penas). His output exceeded 400 publications with close to 20,000 citations.

== Honours and legacy ==
Rivas-Martínez was elected to Spain's Royal Academy of Pharmacy and the Royal Academy of Exact, Physical and Natural Sciences, and received honorary doctorates from the University of the Basque Country (1995), the University of Granada (1996), the University of León (2005), the Technical University of Lisbon (2001), Marche Polytechnic University, Ancona (2002). His teaching and publications shaped modern phytosociology and geobotany in Spain and influenced work across Portugal, Italy and the wider Mediterranean.

== Selected publications ==
- Rivas-Martínez, Salvador (1987). Memoria del mapa de series de vegetación de España (escala 1:400 000) [Memoir of the map of vegetation series of Spain (scale 1:400,000)] (PDF) (in Spanish).
- Rivas-Martínez, Salvador; Fernández-González, F.; Loidi, J.; Lousã, M.; Penas, Á. (2001). "Syntaxonomical checklist of vascular plant communities of Spain and Portugal to association level". Itinera Geobotanica. 14: 5–341.
- Rivas-Martínez, Salvador; Penas, Ángel; Díaz-González, Tomás E. (2004). Biogeographic map of Europe (Map). León: Cartographic Service, University of León.
- Rivas-Martínez, Salvador; Rivas-Sáenz, Salvador; Penas, Ángel (2011). "Worldwide bioclimatic classification system". Global Geobotany. 1: 1–634.
- Rivas-Martínez, Salvador; Navarro, G.; Penas, Á.; Costa, M. (2011). "Biogeographic map of South America. A preliminary survey". International Journal of Geobotanical Research. 1: 21–40.
- Rivas-Martínez, Salvador; Penas, Á.; Díaz-González, T. E.; Del Río, S.; Cantó, P.; Herrero, L.; Pinto Gomes, C.; Costa, J. C. (2014). "Biogeography of Spain and Portugal: preliminary typological synopsis". International Journal of Geobotanical Research. 4: 1–64.
