= Asterochloris =

Scientific classification
- Kingdom: Plantae
- Division: Chlorophyta
- Class: Trebouxiophyceae
- Order: Trebouxiales
- Family: Trebouxiaceae
- Genus: Asterochloris; Tscherm.-Woess, 1980

Type species
- Asterochloris phycobiontica Tscherm.-Woess, 1980

Genus of algae

Asterochloris is a genus of green algae in the family Trebouxiophyceae. It is a common photobiont in lichen, occurring in the thalli of more than 20 lichen genera worldwide. Asterochloris is distinguishable from the morphologically similar genus Trebouxia, primarily due to its deeply lobed chloroplast, the placement of the chloroplast along the cell's periphery before the initiation of zoospore or aplanospore formation, and its tendency to primarily reproduce asexually through the production of aplanospores.

== Taxonomy ==
The genus was circumscribed in 1980 by Elisabeth Tschermak-Woess, with Asterochloris phycobiontica assigned as the type species. She differentiated it from the related genus Trebouxia by differences in chloroplast morphology. Later molecular research showed that Trebouxia was paraphyletic, and that some Trebouxia species were closely related to genus Asterochloris. In 2010, Škaloud and Peksa proposed to split the genus Trebouxia and formally delineate genus Asterochloris.

Within the broader classification of green algae, Asterochloris belongs to the order Trebouxiales within the class Trebouxiophyceae. Current research suggests that several cryptic species within the genus still await formal description.

== Description ==
Asterochloris is characterised by its unique cellular structure and reproduction methods. Each Asterochloris cell is spherical and exists in isolation, containing a single nucleus. The cell wall is thin and firm, lacking the gelatinous texture often found in similar organisms. Inside, there is a single chloroplast—the component responsible for photosynthesis—shaped like a thick cup with edges that resemble the rays of a star, and it may contain one or multiple pyrenoids. Pyrenoids are specialised structures within the chloroplast that play a crucial role in the synthesis of starch. These pyrenoids are encircled by grains of starch, suggesting an active photosynthetic machinery.

Additionally, the cells of Asterochloris frequently contain clear, oily droplets, which are likely used as energy storage. Unlike some algae that reproduce through the production of autosporous (self-generating) spores, Asterochloris propagates through the release of zoospores or aplanospores. These spores are produced through successive cell divisions.

In 2015, Skaloud and Peksa updated the description of Asterochloris, providing more detailed insights into its cellular features and reproductive behaviours. They observed that, in addition to being spherical, cells of Asterochloris can also be oval or pear-shaped, and the cell wall, while generally thin, may have localized areas of thickening. The nucleus of each cell is positioned along the side within a large fold of the chloroplast, a green structure critical for photosynthesis that has a star-like shape with lobes extending to the cell's edge. Central to the chloroplast are one to several pyrenoids, structures essential for starch production, surrounded by a noticeable layer of starch, indicating the cell's active energy production.

Skaloud and Peksa further detailed that before the algae reproduce asexually—either through the release of swimming spores (zoospores) or non-swimming spores (aplanospores)—the chloroplast changes shape, flattening against the cell wall. The reproduction process typically results in a large number of spores, ranging from 64 to 128, and in rare cases, the algae can produce 2 to 8 self-replicating spores (autospores). They also noted that zoospores are unique in their appearance, lacking a protective covering, being flattened from back to front, and equipped with two forward-facing flagella for movement. These zoospores carry their green chloroplast at the back, the nucleus in the middle or toward the back, and lack a clear visual receptor (stigma). When zoospores are released, they initially swim together as a group, connected at the back, before dispersing. Skaloud and Peksa also mentioned that sexual reproduction occurs but is rare, involving the merging of two similar (isogamous) gametes.

== Habitat and distribution ==
Asterochloris is a widely distributed and cosmopolitan genus. It is a common photobiont in lichen, occurring in the thalli of more than 20 lichen genera worldwide. The genus associates primarily with mycobionts from the families Cladoniaceae and Stereocaulaceae.

While primarily known as a lichen symbiont, free-living populations of Asterochloris have been documented in various environments. These include soil communities, mountain tundra regions, and on tree bark in sub-Mediterranean regions of Slovenia and Italy. In an unusual habitat, the genus has also been detected on the hair of sloths in South and Central America.

== Species ==
- Asterochloris antarctica Y.J.Kim, J.I.Kim & W.Shin, 2020 – Antarctica
- Asterochloris echinata Skaloud & Peksa
- Asterochloris erici (Ahmadjian) Skaloud & Peksa
- Asterochloris excentrica (Archibald) Skaloud & Peksa
- Asterochloris friedlii Skaloud & Peksa
- Asterochloris gaertneri Skaloud & Peksa
- Asterochloris glomerata (Warén) Skaloud & Peksa
- Asterochloris irregularis (Hildreth & Ahmadjian) Skaloud & Peksa
- Asterochloris italiana (Archibald) Skaloud & Peksa
- Asterochloris leprarii Skaloud & Peksa
- Asterochloris lobophora Skaloud & Peksa
- Asterochloris magnus (Archibald) Skaloud & Peksa
- Asterochloris mediterranea E.Barreno, S.Chiva, P.Moya & P.Škaloud, 2015 – Iberian Peninsula; Canary Islands
- Asterochloris phycobiontica E.Tschermak-Woess
- Asterochloris pseudoirregularis Y.J.Kim, J.I.Kim & W.Shin, 2020 – Antarctica
- Asterochloris pyriformis Thüs et al.
- Asterochloris sejongensis Kim & Shin, 2017 – Antarctica; Cladonia pyxidata, Sphaerophorus globosus
- Asterochloris stereocaulonicola Y.J.Kim, J.I.Kim & W.Shin, 2020 – Antarctica
- Asterochloris woessiae Skaloud & Peksa
