= Parmelia asiatica =

Scientific classification
- Domain: Eukaryota
- Kingdom: Fungi
- Division: Ascomycota
- Class: Lecanoromycetes
- Order: Lecanorales
- Family: Parmeliaceae
- Genus: Parmelia
- Species: P. asiatica

Binomial name
- Parmelia asiatica A.Crespo & Divakar (2011)

Species of lichen-forming fungus

Parmelia asiatica is a species of corticolous (bark-dwelling) foliose lichen in the family Parmeliaceae. It was described as new to science in 2011 by lichenologists Ana Crespo and Pradeep Divakar, based on specimens from Yunnan, China. Since then, its known distribution has expanded to include various regions of Russia, parts of North America, and as of 2024, European Russia. The species is found in the forests of temperate and boreal climates, growing on the bark of various tree species. Parmelia asiatica is distinguished by its small thallus with narrow, more or less linear lobes, soralia that appear at the ends of the lobes, marginal linear pseudocyphellae, and a chemical composition that includes atranorin, salazinic acid, and consalazinic acid. While similar to other Parmelia species, it can be differentiated from them by its morphological and chemical characteristics.

== Taxonomy ==
Parmelia asiatica was first described as a new species by lichenologists Ana Crespo and Pradeep Divakar in 2011. The specific epithet asiatica refers to its distribution in Asia. The type specimen was collected from Shibaoshan park (Jianchuan County, Yunnan, China), at an elevation of 2,490 m (8,170 ft).

== Description ==
The thallus of Parmelia asiatica is adnate and small, measuring up to 3 cm (1.2 in) across. The lobes are somewhat linear, separate, and 1–2 mm wide. The upper surface is pale greenish to whitish-grey, with a brownish tinge towards the lobe tips. The surface is smooth, pseudocyphellate, and sorediate, without isidia. The lobes are narrow and sublinear with sparse pseudocyphellae. Marginal pseudocyphellae appear as continuous white rims up to 2 mm long. Soralia develop on the lobe tips and are orbicular, spherical, or hemispherical, with granular soredia. The soralia are terminal on the tips of the lobes. The medulla is white, while the lower surface is black and densely rhizinate, with densely squarrosely branched rhizines up to 1 mm long. No apothecia or pycnidia have been observed in the type specimens.

Chemical analysis shows that P. asiatica contains atranorin, salazinic acid, and consalazinic acid as secondary metabolites.

There are differences between Russian samples of Parmelia asiatica and the original description provided by Lumbsch and colleagues in 2011. The specimens from Siberia and Kamchatka have linear marginal soralia, in addition to the spherical or hemispherical terminal ones. Younger lobes have marginal and linear to sublinear pseudocyphellae, which later become laminal and sometimes slightly reticulate. Older samples have fissures on the upper surface of lobes, and a few pycnidia were identified in two specimens. Tested specimens from Baikal Siberia and the Kamchatka Peninsula all contain consalazinic acid, in addition to salazinic acid and atranorin.

=== Similar species ===
Parmelia asiatica is similar to Parmelia protosulcata, a species found in Australia, New Zealand, South America, and the Falkland Islands. However, Parmelia asiatica contains salazinic acid and has a temperate Southeast Asian distribution. The species also shares some features with Parmelia sulcata and Parmelia hygrophiloides, such as the presence of salazinic acid, a sorediate upper surface, and squarrose rhizines.

Parmelia asiatica is readily distinguished from P. sulcata by its terminal soralia and marginal linear pseudocyphellae. Additionally, P. asiatica has a smaller thallus compared to P. sulcata. P. sulcata has a larger thallus with the upper surface often becoming cracked along prominent pseudocyphellae with granular soredia arranged mainly in laminal, linear soralia.

These morphological characteristics also distinguish it from the chemically similar Notoparmelia cunninghamii, found in Australasia and southern South America.

== Habitat and distribution ==
Parmelia asiatica has been recorded across Europe, Asia, and North America. In Europe, the species was first documented in 2024 from European Russia, specifically in the Kerzhensky State Nature Reserve (Nizhny Novgorod Region). In this location, it was found growing on the bark of Quercus robur (English oak) in deciduous forests.

In Asia, P. asiatica has a more extensive documented presence. The species was initially described from Yunnan Province in China, where it grows on Rhododendron tree trunks in humid montane Rhododendron forests at an elevation of 2,490 m (8,170 ft). In Russia, the species has been recorded across a wide geographical range. It has been found in Siberia, specifically in the Irkutsk Region and the Republic of Buryatia. In the Russian Far East, P. asiatica has been documented in several areas including Magadan Oblast, Kamchatka Krai, Amur Oblast, and Sakhalin Oblast, with records from both Sakhalin Island and Iturup Island. The Russian specimens have been found in a variety of forest types, including humid spruce, fir, and birch forests in mountain river valleys at elevations ranging from 160–607 m (525–1,991 ft) above sea level. In these regions, P. asiatica grows on the bark of various trees, primarily spruce and birch, in boreal coniferous forests.

In North America, P. asiatica has been recorded in Canada (British Columbia) and the USA (Washington State and Alaska).

The presence of P. asiatica in the Kerzhensky State Nature Reserve is particularly noteworthy, as it supports the hypothesis that this area represents a contact zone between European and Siberian vascular and lichen flora.
