= Parmelia encryptata =

Scientific classification
- Kingdom: Fungi
- Division: Ascomycota
- Class: Lecanoromycetes
- Order: Lecanorales
- Family: Parmeliaceae
- Genus: Parmelia
- Species: P. encryptata

Binomial name
- Parmelia encryptata A.Crespo, Divakar & M.C.Molina (2011)

Species of lichen

Parmelia encryptata is a species of corticolous (bark-dwelling), foliose lichen in the family Parmeliaceae. Originally reported from the Iberian Peninsula and now confirmed from parts of Central and Eastern Europe, it is a semi-cryptic species that is a member of the Parmelia sulcata species complex, and it is morphologically indistinguishable from that lichen. Molecular phylogenetic analysis, however, shows that it forms a distinct monophyletic lineage separate from P. sulcata. Parmelia encryptata has been estimated to have diverged from the P. squarrosa complex about 5 million years ago. When wet, thalli often show a yellowish-green cast and smoother, narrow-lobed margins, features that can help separate it from the otherwise look-alike P. sulcata.

== Taxonomy ==
Parmelia encryptata was formally described as a new species in 2011 by Ana Crespo, Pradeep Kumar Divakar, and Maria del Carmen Molina. The specific epithet encryptata refers to its cryptic nature, as it is morphologically indistinguishable from P. sulcata but genetically distinct. The holotype specimen was collected from Herbès, Sierra de la Creu in Castellón, Spain, at an elevation of 1000 m, growing on Quercus (oak). Parmelia encryptata was initially identified as P. sulcata based on morphological characters before molecular analysis revealed it as a separate species. Phylogenetic studies using three molecular markers (nuITS, nuIGS rDNA, and partial β-tubulin gene) demonstrated that P. encryptata forms a strongly supported monophyletic group independent of P. sulcata sensu stricto. Subsequent re-evaluations using ITS barcoding confirmed the species and expanded its range in Europe; a 2021 study also pointed to subtle but repeatable differences in rhizine structure relative to P. sulcata. Molecular dating places the split from the P. squarrosa complex in the late Neogene, roughly 5 million years ago.

The discovery of P. encryptata as a cryptic species emerged from earlier studies by Crespo and colleagues (1999), which had shown unexpected genetic variability within what was then considered P. sulcata. This discovery added to a growing body of evidence that traditional morphological methods for species delimitation in lichenized fungi may underestimate actual species diversity.

== Description ==
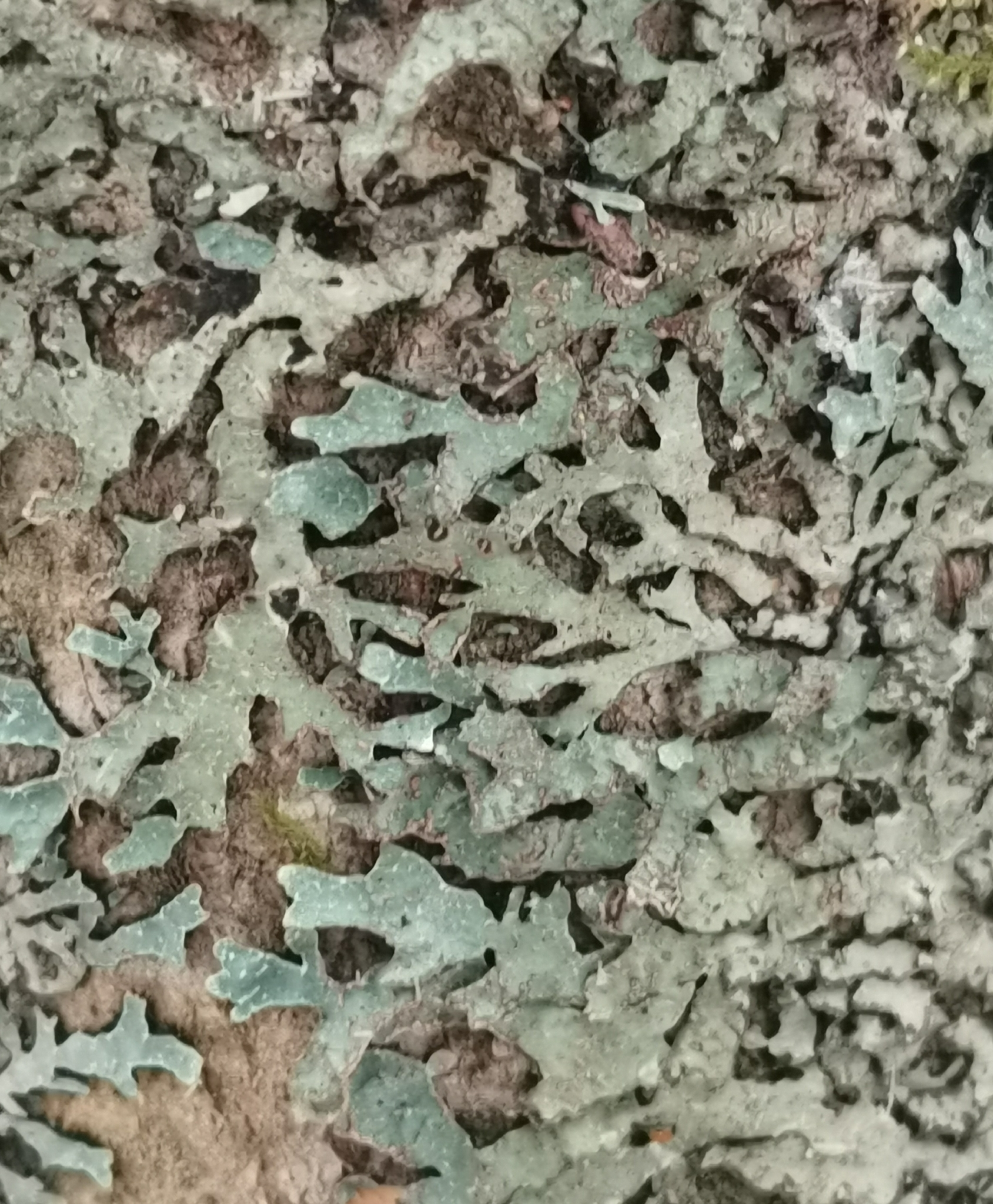
The common and widespread Parmelia sulcata, shown here, is morphologically indistinguishable from P. encryptata.

Despite being genetically distinct, P. encryptata is morphologically identical to P. sulcata and cannot be distinguished through visual examination alone. Like P. sulcata, it is characterized by a grey pseudocyphellate, sorediate upper surface. Chemical analysis shows that P. encryptata contains atranorin, chloroatranorin, salazinic acid, and consalazinic acid, the same chemical profile as P. sulcata. No specimens with apothecia (fruiting bodies) have been observed for P. encryptata.

The species can be distinguished from P. sulcata only through molecular methods. P. encryptata possesses a Group I intron at position 1516 in the nuclear small subunit (SSU) ribosomal DNA, which is absent in P. sulcata in the strict sense (sensu stricto). This results in a PCR product size difference when analysed by gel electrophoresis. Additionally, P. encryptata has unique nucleotide sequences in ITS1 at positions 113, 119, 122, and 124.

Pairwise genetic distances between P. sulcata sensu stricto and P. encryptata range from 0.022 to 0.040 nucleotide substitutions per site, values that fall within the interspecific range supporting its recognition as a distinct species.

Although best confirmed by DNA, wet thalli of P. encryptata often appear more yellowish-green than P. sulcata. Lobes tend to be smoother, with pseudocyphellae and soralia largely marginal rather than evenly laminal. The lower surface shows a mix of rhizines: near the lobe margins they are frequently simple, with squarrose rhizines more central—contrasting with typically squarrose rhizines across the entire underside in P. sulcata.

== Habitat and distribution ==
Parmelia encryptata was first documented from Spain (Castellón and Cáceres) and Ireland (Killarney, County Kerry). It has since been reported from the Czech Republic, Belarus and Estonia, and is now confirmed from Germany (Rhineland-Palatinate and Saarland) based on ITS sequence data. In western Germany it occurs at low to mid elevations (about 170–440 m) on twigs and trunks of deciduous trees, including beech (Fagus sylvatica) and sycamore maple (Acer pseudoplatanus). Throughout its range it is corticolous and is frequently sympatric with P. sulcata, sometimes on the same phorophyte; mixed populations documented in the field were subsequently verified by sequencing.

Work that tracked P. sulcata genotypes across air pollution gradients in England suggested that segregates within the complex can respond differently to improving sulphur dioxide levels; however, species-verified data for P. encryptata remain sparse.
