= Bioclimatology =

Scientific discipline

Bioclimatology is the interdisciplinary field of science that studies the interactions between the biosphere and the Earth's atmosphere on time scales of the order of seasons or longer (in contrast to biometeorology).

== Examples of relevant processes ==
Climate processes largely control the distribution, size, shape and properties of living organisms on Earth. For instance, the general circulation of the atmosphere on a planetary scale broadly determines the location of large deserts or the regions subject to frequent precipitation, which, in turn, greatly determines which organisms can naturally survive in these environments. Furthermore, changes in climates, whether due to natural processes or to human interference, may progressively modify these habitats and cause overpopulation or extinction of indigenous species.

The biosphere, for its part, and in particular continental vegetation, which constitutes over 99% of the total biomass, has played a critical role in establishing and maintaining the chemical composition of the Earth's atmosphere, especially during the early evolution of the planet (See History of Earth for more details on this topic). Currently, the terrestrial vegetation exchanges some 60 billion tons of carbon with the atmosphere on an annual basis (through processes of carbon fixation and carbon respiration), thereby playing a critical role in the carbon cycle. On a global and annual basis, small imbalances between these two major fluxes, as may occur through changes in land cover and land use, contribute to the current increase in atmospheric carbon dioxide.
