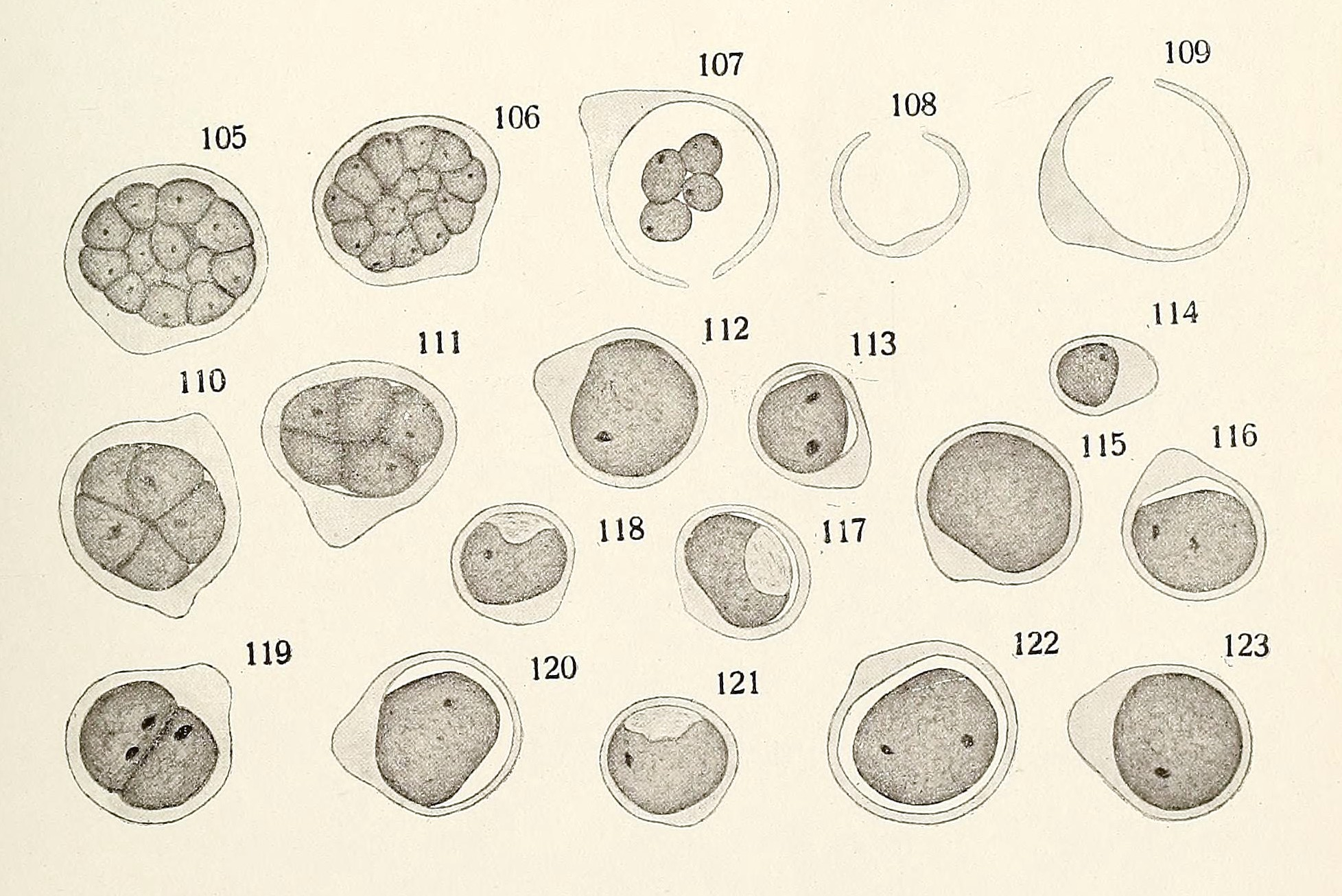
- Myrmecia globosa

Scientific classification
- Kingdom: Plantae
- Division: Chlorophyta
- Class: Trebouxiophyceae
- Order: Trebouxiales
- Family: Trebouxiaceae
- Genus: Myrmecia; Printz

Synonyms
- Friedmannia Chantanachat & Bold

= Myrmecia (alga) =

Genus of algae

Myrmecia is a genus of green algae that is associated with lichens.

== Species ==
The genus has nine recognised species:

- Myrmecia aquatica G.M.Smith
- Myrmecia astigmatica Vinatzer
- Myrmecia biatorellae J.B.Petersen
- Myrmecia bisecta Reisigl
- Myrmecia globosa Printz
- Myrmecia irregularis (J.B.Petersen) Ettl & Gärtner
- Myrmecia israelensis (S.Chantanachat & H.Bold) T.Friedl
- Myrmecia macronucleata (Deason) V.M.Andreeva
- Myrmecia pyriformis J.B.Petersen
