= Navalperal de Tormes =

- municipality
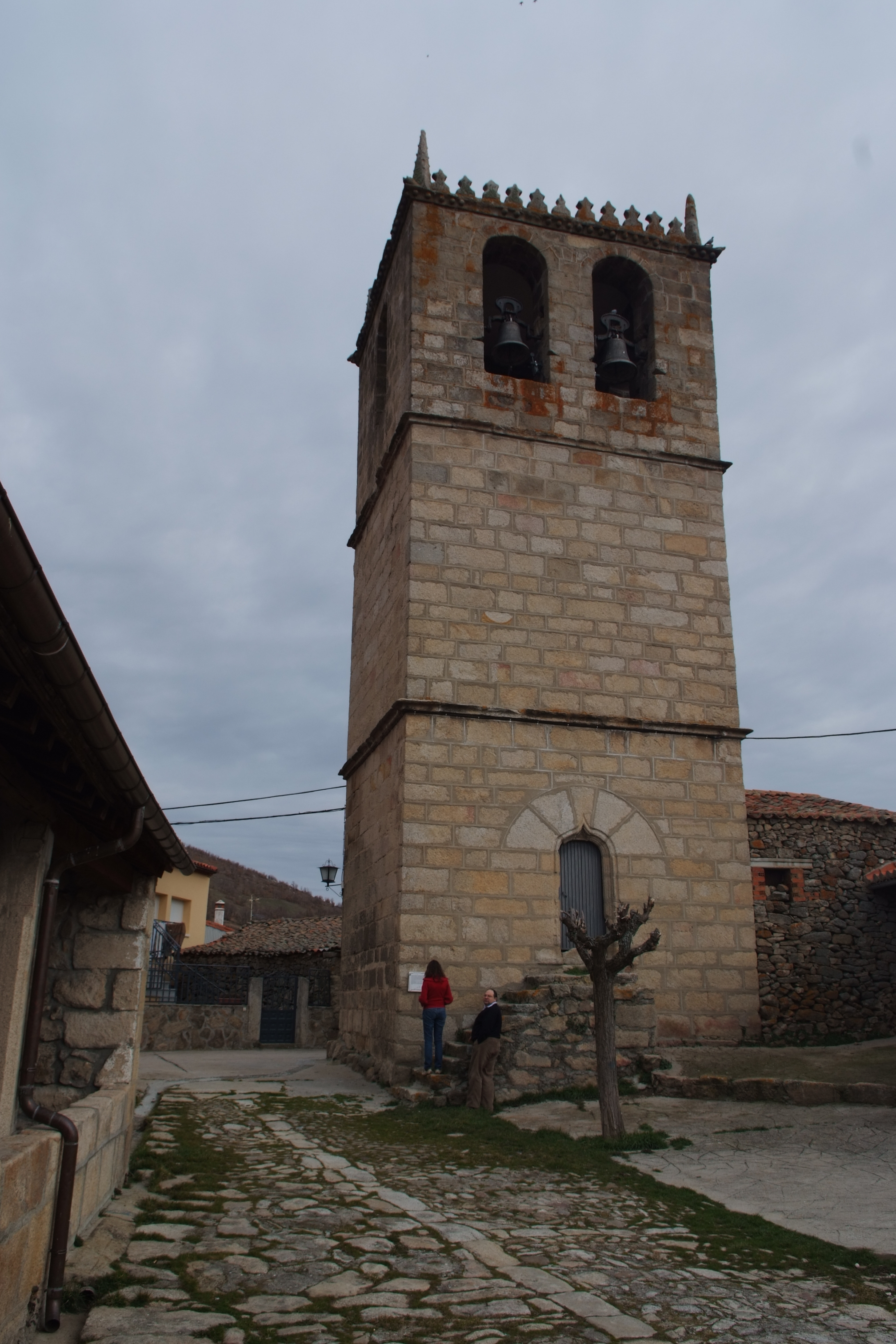
- Navalperal de Tormes Church

- Flag Coat of arms

- Location in Spain. Navalperal de Tormes (Spain)
- Coordinates: 40°21′10″N 5°18′02″W
- Country: Spain
- Autonomous community: Castile and León
- Province: Ávila
- Municipality: Navalperal de Tormes

Area
  - Total: 60 km^{2} (23 sq mi)

Population (2025-01-01)
  - Total: 73
  - Density: 1.2/km^{2} (3.2/sq mi)
- Time zone: UTC+1 (CET)
  - Summer (DST): UTC+2 (CEST)
- Website: Official website

Navalperal de Tormes is a municipality located in the province of Ávila, Castile and León, Spain.

== Population ==
Historical population
Year	Pop.	±% p.a.
2023	83	—
2024	77	−7.23%
2025	73	−5.19%
Source: INE
