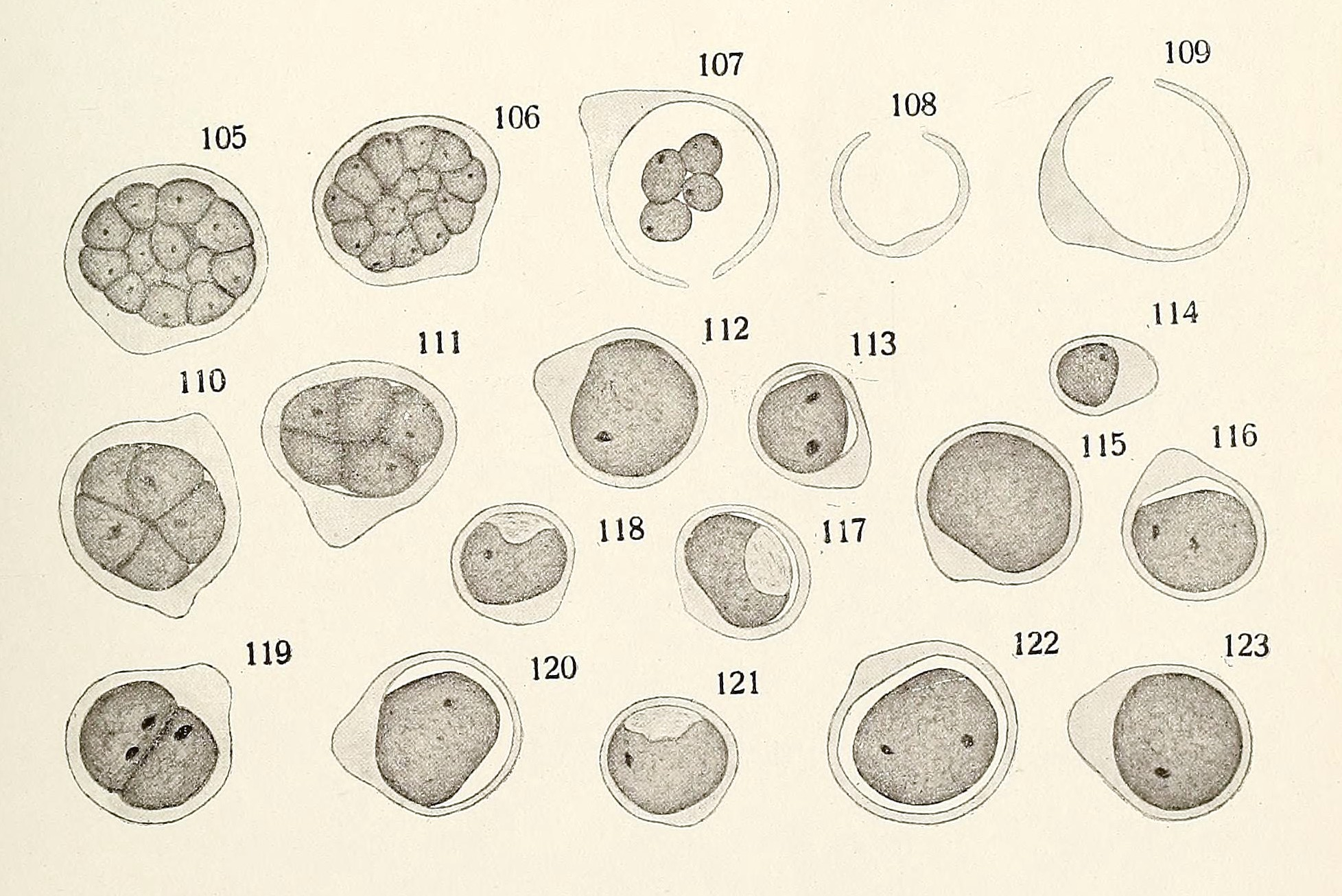
- Myrmecia globosa

Scientific classification
- Kingdom: Plantae
- Division: Chlorophyta
- Class: Trebouxiophyceae
- Order: Trebouxiales
- Family: Trebouxiaceae; Friedl

Genera
- Asterochloris; Dictyochloropsis; Heterochlorella; Lobosphaera; Myrmecia; Parietochloris; Symbiochloris; Trebouxia; Trochisciopsis; Vulcanochloris

= Trebouxiaceae =

Family of algae

Trebouxiaceae is a family of green algae in the order Trebouxiales. Many species of Trebouxiaceae are found as symbionts associated with terrestrial lichens, although some genera are also found free-living.

Trebouxiaceae include some of the most well-known, widespread and species-rich lineages that are symbiotic with lichens.

Phylogenetic relationships:

- - - - Asterochloris
      - Vulcanochloris
    - Myrmecia
  - Trebouxia
