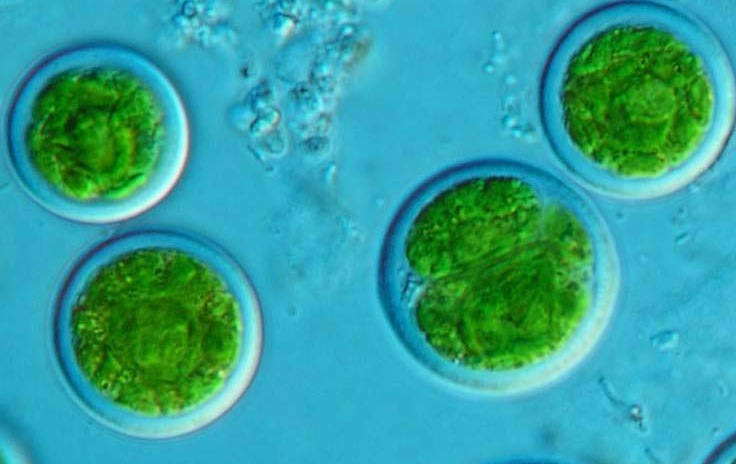

Scientific classification
- Kingdom: Plantae
- Division: Chlorophyta
- Class: Trebouxiophyceae
- Order: Trebouxiales
- Family: Trebouxiaceae
- Genus: Trebouxia; Puymaly

Type species
- Trebouxia arboricola Puymaly

Species
- T. asymmetrica; T. impressa; T. magna; T. usneae; T. jamesii; T. arboricola; T. gelatinosa; T. corticola; T. galapagensis; T. higginsiae; T. gigantea; T. flava; T. potteri; T. showmanii; T. incrustata; T. anticipata; T. aggregata; T. pyriformis; T. decolorans; T. crenulata

Synonyms
- Pseudotrebouxia P.A.Archibald, 1975 (split generally considered incorrect)

= Trebouxia =

Genus of algae

Trebouxia is a unicellular green alga. It is a photosynthetic organism that can exist in almost all habitats found in polar, tropical, and temperate regions. It can either exist in a symbiotic relationship with fungi in the form of lichen or it can survive independently as a free-living organism alone or in colonies. Trebouxia is the most common photobiont in extant lichens. It is a primary producer of marine, freshwater and terrestrial ecosystems. It uses carotenoids and chlorophyll a and b to harvest energy from the sun and provide nutrients to various animals and insects.

An ancestor of Trebouxia may have introduced photosynthesis into terrestrial habitats approximately 450 million years ago. It is also a bioindicator of habitat disturbances, freshwater quality, air pollution, carbon dioxide concentration, and climate change. Furthermore, its life cycle is complex and much research needs to be done to characterize it more completely. For decades, the presence of sexual reproduction was unknown. However, recent (2000s) molecular evidence of recombination and the observation of sexual fusions of gametes to form zygotes suggest that sexual reproduction occurs.

Trebouxia (as circumscribed in 1994) is a paraphyletic group; the issue was resolved by moving some members to Asterochloris. Horizontal gene transfer of protein encoding genes between fungi and Trebouxia is known to have occurred. There is also evidence of intron horizontal gene transfer among different strains of Trebouxia in lichen thalli. The presence of globose cells in fossil lichens from the Lower Devonian period (415 million years ago) that look similar to Trebouxia indicate the significance of Trebouxia-like fungal symbiosis throughout the terrestrial history of Earth.

== History of knowledge ==
The genus Trebouxia was initially circumscribed by Puymaly in 1924. The type species of the genus is Trebouxia arboricola. The genus name of Trebouxia honours Octave Treboux (1876–ca. 1940), who was an Estonian botanist and plant physiologist, from the National University of Kharkiv and Riga. The genus was divided into two genera Trebouxia and Pseudotrebouxia. Some recent (2000s) studies imply that the differences between two groups are invalid. Trebouxia should instead be divided in different ways such as splitting Trebouxia into two genera, Asterochloris (including photobionts of suborder Cladoniinae) and Trebouxia (including photobionts of suborder Lecanorineae). The split to Asterochloris was formally done in 2010. The remaining species of Trebouxia are known to occur in four clades in molecular analysis, termed "A", "C", "I", and "S". A new "D" clade was found in 2020.

Trebouxia’s systematic location and taxonomy has been uncertain for decades. Initially, in 1995, the group was placed in the order Pleurastrales and then in Microthamniales. Later in 2002, it was part of the order Chlorococcales and now it is placed in the order Trebouxiales. It is unknown whether all photobionts described as “trebouxioid” belong to a single genus. Also, it is also unclear how many and which species should be accepted and recognized.

Furthermore, in earlier years, classification and nomenclature of species was based on organism’s color, size, growth and shape of colonies, texture, and the lichen it was isolated from. It was believed that each algae species belonged to a specific lichen species. However, since the 1960s, each Trebouxia species has been treated independently from lichen species since the same species of Trebouxia can be associated with many lichens. Later, classification and nomenclature of species was based on morphological characteristics such as chloroplast shape and pyrenoid structure. Currently Trebouxia species are delimited based on a combination of different characteristics, such as morphological, physiological, and molecular data. As of 2020, most of the diversity within Trebouxia has yet to be formally described.

== Habitat and ecology ==
Trebouxia is a photosynthetic autotrophic genus that can exist in almost every environmental condition in nature. It can be found in the tropics, Arctic, Antarctic, boreal forest, fresh water, marine, bare rocks, wood debris, tree bark, sandstone, soil, hot and semi-arid deserts.

Some species can live in extreme conditions such as dry valleys of Antarctica with less than 5% soil moisture or habitats that are rich in iron and metals. It can tolerate a wide range of temperatures and prolonged periods of desiccation;. Carotenoids such as xanthophyll astaxanthin allow Trebouxia to tolerate high irradiance.

Furthermore, Trebouxia can exist in its free-living form or in a lichen thallus as a photobiont partner with its fungi mycobiont. The release or escape of alga zoospores from intact lichens is a source of free-living algae colonies or single free-living cells. Moreover, the same Trebouxia species can be associated with many mycobiont species or many Trebouxia strains can inhabit single lichen. However, the maturation of the lichen could lead to the elimination of all Trebouxia strains except one. Also, Trebouxia species are not selective towards their fungal symbionts while fungal species are very selective regarding their algae partners. In areas where algae species are scarce, fungi are less selective and forms a symbiotic relationship with any Trebouxia species and later on switch to a more suitable algae species. Some Trebouxia species are highly dependent on their fungal partners and cannot exist as independent organisms. Fungi obtain nutrients through self parasitism or selectively harvesting old Trebouxia cells. Trebouxia, on the other hand, provides 90% of its photosynthetic products to the mycoboint. Pyrenoglobuli (lipid rich stores in the pyrenoid of Trebouxia) are used by the mycoboint for energy and water.

Trebouxia acts as an important primary producer in freshwater, marine, and terrestrial ecosystems. Trebouxia uses carotenoids and chlorophyll a and b to harvest energy from the sun and synthesize organic compounds that serve as a substantial food source for a wide range of heterotrophs including animals, invertebrates and insects.

== Description of the organism ==
=== Morphology ===
Trebouxia is a unicellular spherical green alga that contains a star-like (stellate) or aggregated chloroplast with a single pyrenoid (aggregation of enzymes) at the centre. The size of cells can range from 8- 21 μm in length.

Trebouxia is divided into two groups based on shape of vegetative cells and nature of chromatophore. In the first group, chromatophores are located in the parietal position during the cell division and are deeply incised with irregular, narrow processes that extend to the cell wall and compress against it. The shape of vegetative cells is ellipsoidal in group 1. In group 2, chromatophores are smooth-margined structures located in a central position during the cell division and are not compressed against the cell wall. The vegetative cells are spherical in group 2.

All Trebouxia associated with lichen possess lipid-rich globules in their pyrenoids known as pyrenoglobuli. Pyrenoglobuli are used by fungi in the lichen thallus for energy and as a water source. Trebouxia phycobionts possess different amounts and types of pigments such as chlorophylls and carotenoids in different environmental conditions. For instance, Antarctic Trebouxia contains low chlorophyll a, high chlorophyll b, and diverse carotenoids compared to Mid-European Trebouxia phycobionts due to the low-temperature fluorescence spectra in Antarctica.

=== Reproduction and life cycle ===
Reproduction in Trebouxia is mediated by autospores and zoospores. Autospores are non-motile spores that have the same shape as their parent cells. They are produced inside the parent cells. Zoospores are motile spores that are produced inside the lichen thalli and released. They are similar in structure and size in all Trebouxia taxa. They are 4-6 μm in size and do not possess a cell wall. This allows them to change shape and fit into the fungal network.

Later in development, they round up to form walls and become vegetative cells. The zoospores are flattened cells that contain a cup- shaped green chromatophore and two flagella of equal length arising from the basal body and extending beyond the length of body. They contain one contractile vacuole, nucleus, dictyosome, chloroplast, and single mitochondrial reticulum or branched mitochondria linked to microbody. Some species have a stigma (eyespots) which helps orient zoospores towards high light intensity. There are two types of endoplasmic reticulum cisternae. One type connects to two basal bodies and one nucleus. The other type attaches to left and right plasma membrane at cell surfaces.

The cell division of Trebouxia occurs by the cleavage of the chromatophore into two equal halves followed by the pyrenoid division. The pyrenoid can either divide by simple constriction or it can disappear during the division of the chromatophore as observed during zoosporogenesis. In some cells, the nucleus divides before the second division of chromatophore halves whereas in other cells it divides after the second division of the chromatophore by migrating to centre of cell between chromatophore halves. The detail of cell division is understudied and more research needs to be conducted.

Trebouxia has a complex life cycle. The details of the life cycle are not properly understood, and more research is required. Reproduction in Trebouxia can occur by zoospores or autospores. Zoospores are flagellated motile stages within lichens that migrate and settle near fungal spores when liquid water is present. The clustering of zoospores around fungal spores can lead to the secretion of an attractant that induces zoospores settlement. Once the zoospores settle, they change shape and round up to fit into the fungal network.

The first cell division after zoospore settlement can either result in the formation of zoosporangium/ autosporagium with 4 to 32 adhering autospore packages (tetrads) or into differentiated vegetative cells. These differentiated vegetative cells are later transformed into zoosporangium/ autosporangia with numerous small autospores, but without adhering packages or tetrad formation. The formation of autospores can occur in two ways. The first way is in which species with permanent aplanosporic (autospore) state arrest the development of zoospores. The division of the chloroplast is accompanied by rounding off and developing a cell wall. In the second way, polygonal- like divisions of the chloroplast form reproductive daughter cells with the cell walls independent of parent cells. The production of aplanospores (autospores) in the second way leads to the development of 16-32 spores in the sporangium.

For many years, no sexual structures or observation of sexual reproduction in Trebouxia were observed.

However, in recent (~2000) years, through molecular methods, evidence of recombination and sexual fusions of gametes of the same size suggests the occurrence of sexual reproduction. The zygotes, quite distinct from zoospores, are 6.6 μm in diameter and smooth walled with two round chloroplasts. First, the gametes pair up and fuse with each other, leading to the formation of zygotes. Then, the flagella disappear and the zygote develops in a normal vegetative pattern.

Initially, it was thought that the fungus suppresses sexual reproduction in Trebouxia to inhibit the formation of novel genotypes that could be less suitable for symbiosis. However, it has recently (~2000) been proposed that Trebouxia are more likely to reproduce sexually in lichen thallus. Furthermore, gametes from different Trebouxia species can escape the thallus and fuse to form hybrids or divide asexually to form micro colonies that can later be lichenized by fungi spores.

Additional evidence of viable fungi spores and Trebouxia spores in fecal matter of lichen eating mites provides insight into short- and long-distance dispersal modes.

== Genetics ==
The symbiosis between Trebouxia and fungi resulted in three horizontal gene transfer events of protein encoding genes from the fungus genome to the Trebouxia genome. Within lichen, horizontal gene transfer can also occur among photobionts. The horizontal gene transfer events of introns among different Trebouxia species have been documented. Many introns can self splice or reverse the splicing reaction or gain motility at DNA or RNA levels that can mediate the transfer process. It is suggested that intron horizontal gene transfer occurs upon the direct cell to cell contact of different Trebouxia strains in immature lichen thallus. When a lichen thallus matures, only one strain of Trebouxia remains while others are eliminated. Viruses that infect Trebouxia and fungi also aid in horizontal gene transfer among different phycobiont species. Furthermore, different techniques have been developed to identify different Trebouxia strains within lichen thalli. Its rDNA (internal transcribed spacer regions recombinant DNA) sequence comparisons with the aid of Polymerase chain reaction (PCR) are easy and fast ways to identify different Trebouxia species that inhabit a thallus.

== Fossil history ==
It is known that the most widespread photobiont in extant lichens is Trebouxia. The fossil lichens from the Lower Devonian (415 million years ago) are composed of algae or cyanobacteria and fungi layers. Through the analysis of scanning electron microscopy, the globose structure of photobionts in Chlorolichenomycites salopensis lichen species during the Lower Devonian looks similar to Trebouxia species.

== Practical importance ==
One of the first organisms to colonize terrestrial habitats were lichens. Lichens, along with few other organisms, introduced nitrogen fixation and photosynthesis into terrestrial environments approximately 450 million years ago. They played a significant role in making the harsh terrestrial environment suitable for the colonization of other organisms such as land plants, animals, and insects. Even today lichens make many unsuitable extreme habitats more suitable for species to colonize and survive. Lichens increase the amount of organic matter and organic nitrogen in the soil by producing organic acid that increases rock weathering.

Furthermore, lichens are a critical bioindicators of habitat disturbances, freshwater quality, air pollution, carbon dioxide measures, and long term ecological continuity of undisturbed forests. Lichens are also used to date the divergence times of many extinct or extant species. Moreover, lichens are critical in climate change and global warming studies to understand the effects of increasing greenhouse gasses such as carbon dioxide in natural environments. The position of Trebouxia at the base of the food chain as a primary producer is critical for the maintenance of freshwater, marine, and terrestrial ecosystems.

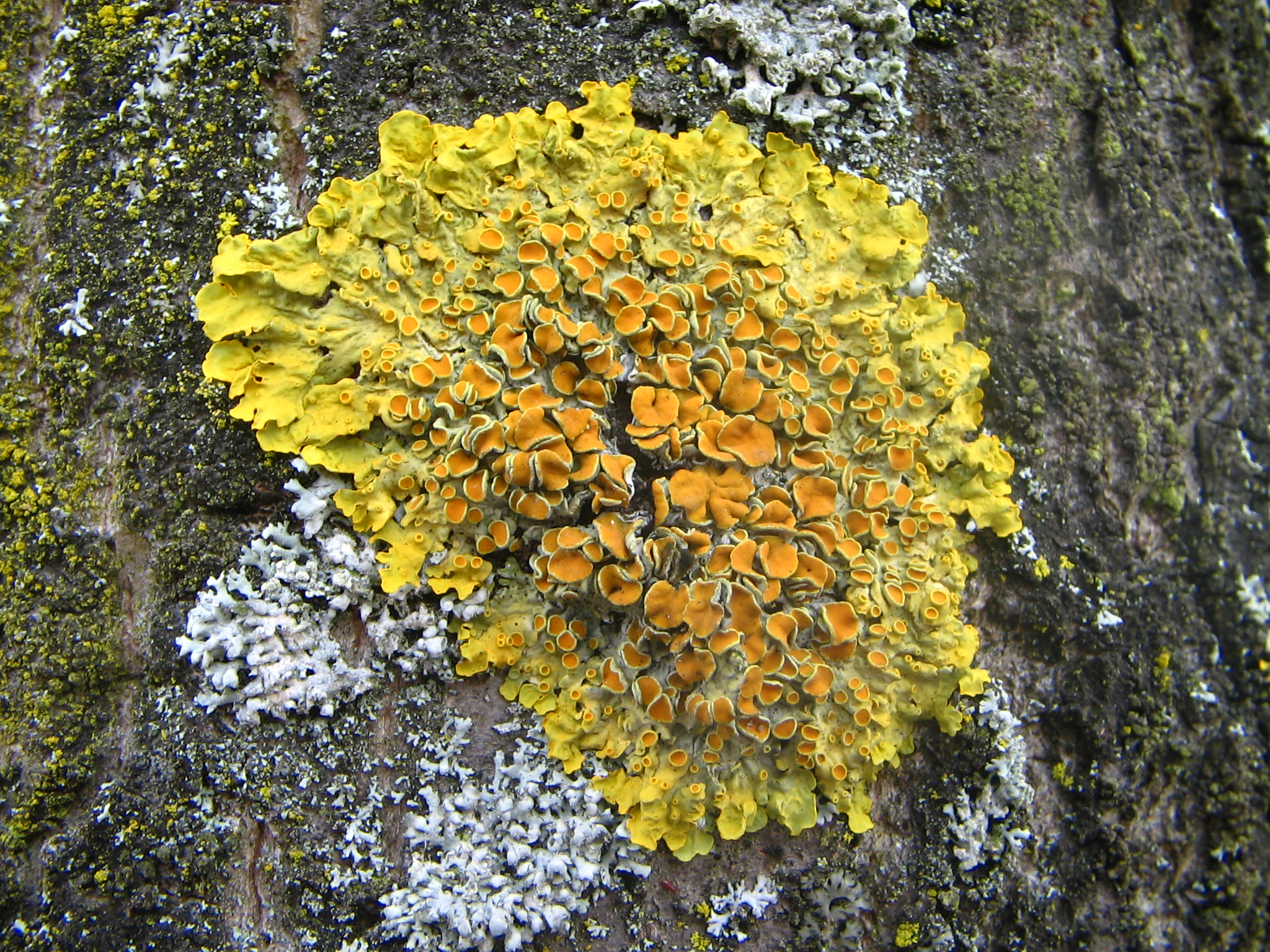
Trebouxia algae commonly occur as symbionts in lichens, such as Xanthoria parietina.
