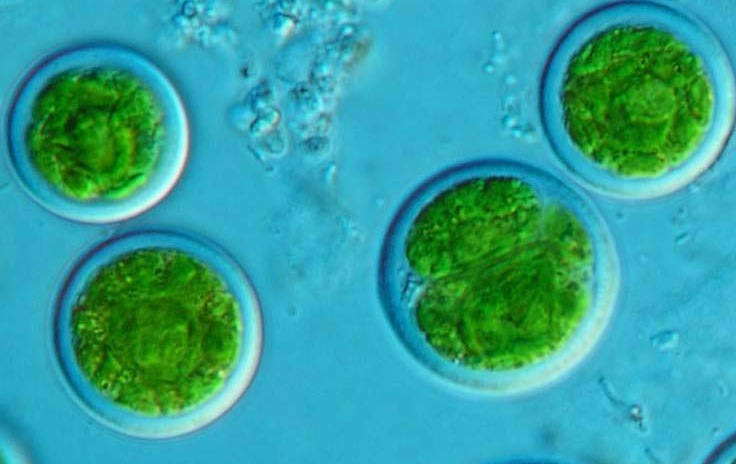
- Trebouxia sp.

Scientific classification
- Kingdom: Plantae
- Division: Chlorophyta
- Class: Trebouxiophyceae
- Order: Trebouxiales; Friedl

Families
- Botryococcaceae; Choricystidaceae; Trebouxiaceae

= Trebouxiales =

Order of algae

The Trebouxiales are an order of green algae in the class Trebouxiophyceae.
