= Parmelia rojoi =

Scientific classification
- Domain: Eukaryota
- Kingdom: Fungi
- Division: Ascomycota
- Class: Lecanoromycetes
- Order: Lecanorales
- Family: Parmeliaceae
- Genus: Parmelia
- Species: P. rojoi

Binomial name
- Parmelia rojoi A.Crespo, V.J.Rico & Divakar (2020)

Species of lichen

Parmelia rojoi is a species of foliose (leafy), saxicolous (rock-dwelling) lichen in the large family Parmeliaceae. It is known to occur in a couple of humid forests in southern Spain. It is quite similar in appearance to the more widespread Parmelia saxatilis, but has a more fragile thallus and smaller isidia.

== Taxonomy ==
Parmelia rojoi was formally described as a new species in 2020 by Ana Crespo, Víctor Jiménez Rico, and Pradeep Kumar Divakar. The type specimen was collected in Los Alcornocales Natural Park (Málaga, Andalucía). At the time of publication, only five collections of the species had been documented. All specimen are sterile—meaning they do not produce apothecia, reproducing instead via vegetative propagules. The species epithet rojoi honours physics professor and friend of the authors, Juan M. Rojo.

Considered a member of the Parmelia saxatilis species complex based on shared morphological similarities, Parmelia rojoi has been identified as belonging to a distinct genetic lineage based on molecular analysis of DNA sequences.

== Description ==
The leafy thallus of Parmelia rojoi has a grey to brownish colour, and reaches up to about 5 cm (2.0 in) in diameter. The lobes comprising the thallus are brittle when dry and have a slight pruina on their margins; they measure up to 4.5 cm (1.8 in) wide. The underside of the thallus is brown to black, and has abundant simple or furcate rhizines serving as holdfasts to attach the lichen to its rock growing surface. Pseudocyphellae (tiny pores for gas exchange) occur abundantly on the thallus surface, forming a network. The medulla is white. Isidia have a spherical to cylindrical shape and are up to 0.15 mm in diameter (smaller than P. saxatilis, which has isidia up to 0.3 mm in diameter).

Lichen products that occur in Parmelia rojoi include atranorin and salazinic acid as major metabolites, and chloroatranorin, lichesterinic acid, protolichesterinic acid, galbinic acid, and consalazinic acid as minor compounds. It does not contain lobaric acid, which helps to distinguish it chemically from some other members of the Parmelia saxatilis species group. P. ernstiae and P. serrana are sympatric members of this group.

== Habitat and distribution ==
Parmelia rojoi is only known to occur in mild, warm localities in southern Spain, in the Cádiz and Málaga provinces. It grows on sun-exposed sandstone in humid forests that are dominated by oak and Olea, and has been documented at low elevations of about 487 m (1,598 ft). The species is considered rare in the Iberian Peninsula.
