= Leod (disambiguation) =

Leod may refer to:

- Leod, a character in the traditions of Clan MacLeod, considered to be the founder of the clan, thought to have lived in the 13th century
- Leod Macgilleandrais, a character in 17th-century clan tradition, thought to have lived in the 14th century
- Léod, a character in The Lord of the Rings
- Léot of Brechin, a 12th-century Scottish cleric
