= Jenny Vaughan (artist) =

Scottish artist (1944–2022)

Jenny Vaughan (1944–2022) was a Scottish artist.

== Early life and education ==
Born Jennifer Campbell in 1944 in Bangalore, British India, to Scottish parents, she pursued art from an early age, studying at Harrogate School of Art and Sunderland Art School after declining an offer from London St Martin's.

== Career ==
In the 1970s, Vaughan founded a knitwear company on the Isle of Lewis, which used local Harris tweed wool and employed twenty women. In the 1990s, she developed a technique for creating gesso panels, and contributed to projects such as the House for an Art Lover in Glasgow, which drew inspiration from the work of Margaret Macdonald Mackintosh.

Beginning in 1968, Vaughan worked closely with her husband, Dai Vaughan. Together, they worked on numerous artistic projects, including interior designs for public venues and private commissions both in the United Kingdom and internationally. Notable among their works is a gesso panel created in 2018 for the Salon de Luxe at the Mackintosh Willow Tea Rooms.
