= Parmelia mayi =

Scientific classification
- Domain: Eukaryota
- Kingdom: Fungi
- Division: Ascomycota
- Class: Lecanoromycetes
- Order: Lecanorales
- Family: Parmeliaceae
- Genus: Parmelia
- Species: P. mayi

Binomial name
- Parmelia mayi Divakar, A.Crespo & M.C.Molina (2011)

Species of lichen

Parmelia mayi is a species of foliose lichen in the family Parmeliaceae. It is found in the northern Appalachian Mountains of eastern North America, where it grows on rocks and on the trunks of paper birch and balsam fir. Parmelia mayi is morphologically indistinguishable from Parmelia saxatilis, but is distinct in its distribution, chemistry, and genetics.

== Taxonomy ==
The lichen was formally described as a new species in 2011 by Pradeep Divakar, Ana Crespo, and Maria del Carmen Molina. The species epithet honors North American lichenologist Philip F. May, who collected the type specimens from Mount Everett (Berkshire County, Massachusetts) at an altitude of 790 m (2,590 ft). Here it was found growing on the trunk of a paper birch tree (Betula papyrifera). Parmelia mayi is a formerly cryptic species that is a member of the species complex grouped around Parmelia saxatilis. Because of its close visible resemblance, it had previously been misidentified as that species until molecular phylogenetic analysis showed it to be genetically distinct. A 2016 study estimates that P. mayi diverged from others species in the P. saxatilis group during the Pleistocene, 0.4 million years ago. The study also showed that despite their morphological similarity, these two lichens are only distantly related to each other.

== Description ==
The foliose (leafy) gray thallus of Parmelia mayi measures up to 8 cm (3 in) across; it comprises short lobes measuring 2–4 mm (0.08–0.16 in) wide, with edges that or scalloped (crenate) or deeply notched. The thallus surface, which features small pits and depressions, has pseudocyphellae (tiny pores for gas exchange) and isidia, but lacks soralia. The thallus undersurface is black with a brown margin, and has evenly distributed rhizines acting as holdfasts that attach the thallus to its substrate. The lichen contains the secondary compounds lichesterinic acid, protolichesterinic acid, nephrosterinic acid, and isonephrosterinic acid.

== Habitat and distribution ==
Parmelia mayi occurs in mountainous areas of the northern Appalachian Mountains at altitudes ranging from 700 and 1,500 m (2,300 and 4,900 ft). It grows on siliceous rocks, in open oak forests, and on the trunks of balsam fir (Abies balsamea) and paper birch in spruce-fir forests.
