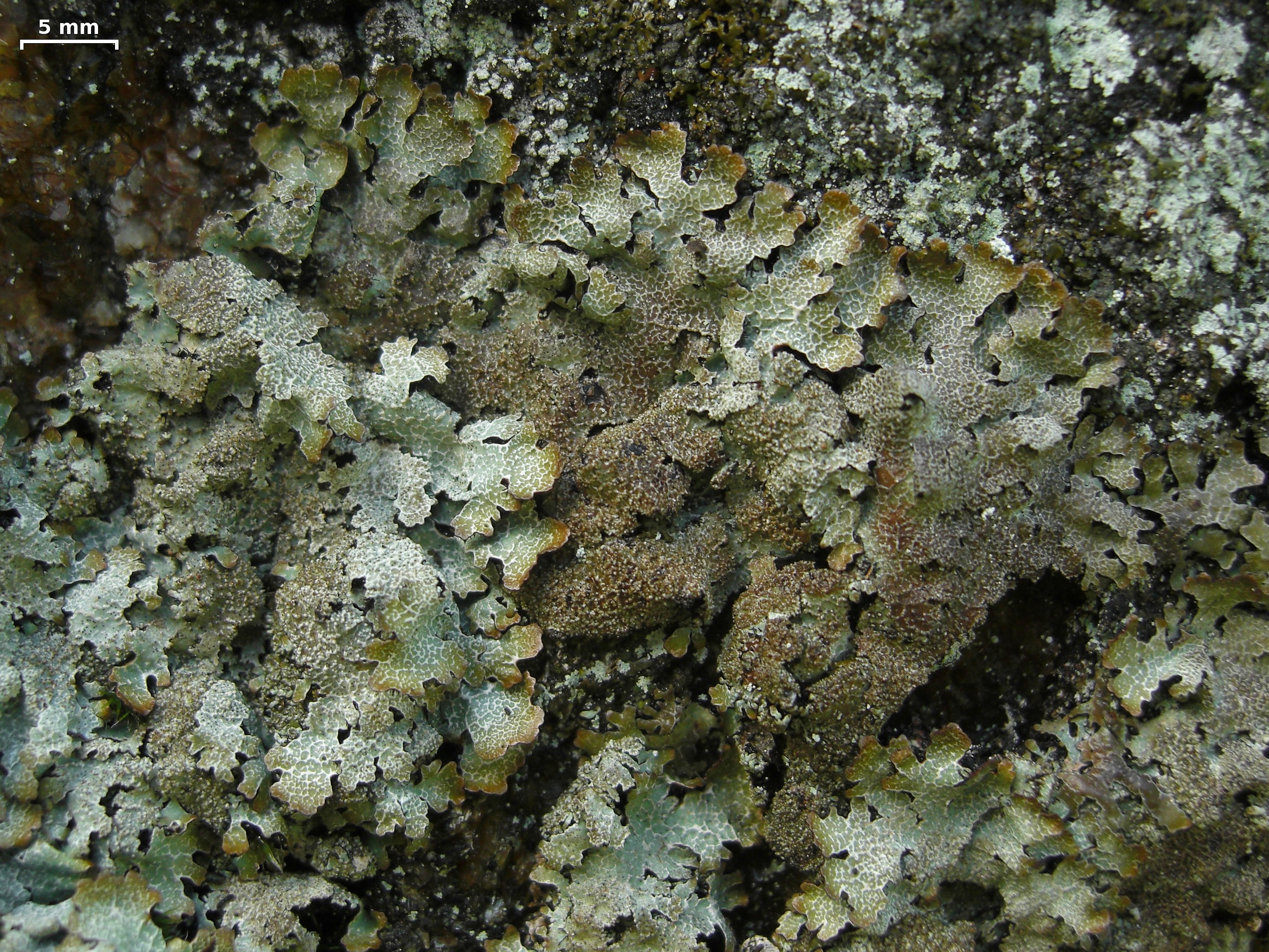

Conservation status
- Least Concern (IUCN 3.1)

- Secure (NatureServe)

Scientific classification
- Kingdom: Fungi
- Division: Ascomycota
- Class: Lecanoromycetes
- Order: Lecanorales
- Family: Parmeliaceae
- Genus: Parmelia
- Species: P. saxatilis

Binomial name
- Parmelia saxatilis (L.) Ach. (1803)

Synonyms
- Lichen saxatilis L. (1753); Geissodea saxatilis (L.) J.St.-Hil. (1805); Platysma saxatile (L.) Frege (1812); Imbricaria saxatilis (L.) Körb. (1846)

= Parmelia saxatilis =

Species of lichen-forming fungus

Parmelia saxatilis, commonly known as the salted shield lichen or crottle, is a species of foliose lichen in the family Parmeliaceae. Several morphologically similar species, formerly lumped together, are now distinguished by their DNA.

== Taxonomy ==
It was first described in 1753 by Carl Linnaeus with the name Lichen saxatilis. Erik Acharius transferred it to Parmelia in 1803.

Molecular phylogenetic studies have shown that Parmelia saxatilis is a member of a species complex–a group of morphologically similar but genetically distinct species. P. discordans, P. ernstiae, P. hygrophila, P. imbricaria, P. mayi, P. omphalodes, P. pinnatifida, P. serrana, P. submontana, P. sulymae, and P. rojoi are other members of this complex. In the case of the European members of this complex, there is no reliable set of morphological and chemical characteristics that can be used to distinguish between these species, and therefore DNA analysis is the only reliable way to identify them. This has been demonstrated in studies conducted in Scotland and Italy.

== Description ==
The lichen has a greenish-gray to bluish-gray thallus that can turn brown in exposed locations. It typically grows on rock, although it is sometimes found on bark or wood. Parmelia saxatilis is used to make dyes with deep red-brown and rusty-orange colors. Known as "crotal" in Scotland, it was used to dye traditional cloths including Harris tweed. A somewhat similar species complex with a cosmopolitan distribution is the Parmelia sulcata group, generally growing on trees.

== Conservation ==
In 2021, Parmelia saxatilis was assessed for the global IUCN Red List. Because the lichen is common, abundant, and widely distributed with a stable population size, it is considered of least concern.

== Ecology ==
Parmelia saxatilis is a known host to the lichenicolous fungus Abrothallus parmeliarum.

== See also ==
- List of lichens named by Carl Linnaeus
