= Frances Beckett (Harris) =

- Born: Frances Sarah Bousfield; 1814
- Died: 7 September 1902 (aged 87–88); Edinburgh
- Other names: Fanny Beckett
- Occupations: Promoter and philanthropist
- Known for: promoting the crafts of the islands of Harris and Lewis
- Spouses: Captain Frederick Thomas, James Flowers Beckett

Frances Sarah Beckett born Frances Sarah Bousfield became Frances Thomas (1814 – 7 September 1902) was a British philanthropist and promoter and organiser of Harris Tweed.

== Life ==
Her parents were Elizabeth (born Dingley) and George Thomas Frederick Bousfield and she was born in 1814. Her father was a solicitor and she came to notice after she moved to the Hebridean isle of Lewis and Harris with her husband, Frederick William Leopold Thomas, who was Captain in the Royal Navy. They had married on 2 December 1841 at St Paul's, Deptford.

She was surprised to see how poor the people were on the island and decided to help them. She had been given a pair of excellent hand knitted socks and in 1859 she went to Edinburgh where she created an agency for the sale of these socks and stockings.

She worked with the landowner Catherine Murray, Countess of Dunmore to create the business of weaving Harris Tweed. The Countess had inherited 150,000 acres (610 km^{2}) of the Dunmore estate on the "island" of Harris in 1845 when her husband died.

At the Edinburgh Exhibition of 1886 the socks from Harris won first prize and Harris Tweed won the prize for their excellence of manufacture. Beckett moved to London in 1888 and the "Scottish Home Industries" which managed the new product, became a limited company in 1896. She was a widow and she married James Flowers Beckett in 1890. He was retired but had been another Royal Navy officer.

== Philanthropy ==
In addition to her assistance to textile workers on the isle of Harris and Tweed she was also involved in several initiatives to improve the lot of the people there. In 1860 she was involved in the new church and manse at Tarbert and in getting the minister's children educated. Even after she remarried and moved to London she paid for a cottage to be built for a nurse at Manish and sent an endowment. Tarbert's minister said that "Harris, perhaps, owes more to her than to anybody else". It is estimated that she helped 800 people to emigrate from the outer Hebrides to Canada or Australia.

Beckett died in Edinburgh in 1902.
