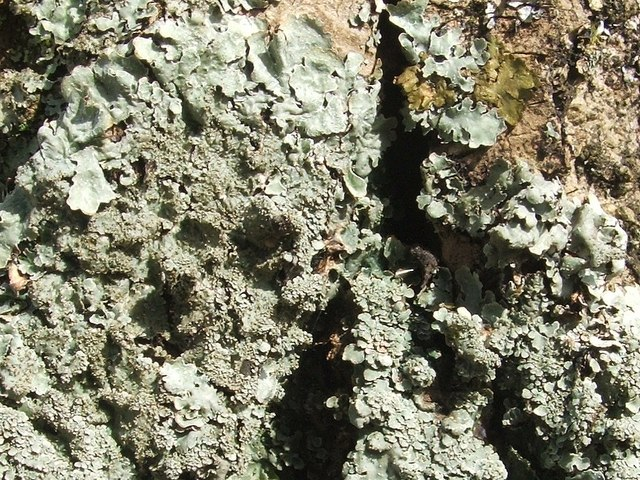

Scientific classification
- Kingdom: Fungi
- Division: Ascomycota
- Class: Lecanoromycetes
- Order: Lecanorales
- Family: Parmeliaceae
- Genus: Parmelia
- Species: P. ernstiae

Binomial name
- Parmelia ernstiae Feuerer & A.Thell (2002)

= Parmelia ernstiae =

Species of lichen

Parmelia ernstiae is a species of foliose lichen in the family Parmeliaceae. It is part of the Parmelia saxatilis species complex and can be distinguished from similar species by its strongly pruinose thallus, small rounded lobes, and unique secondary metabolite composition. First described in 2002 from Germany, P. ernstiae has since been found to be widely distributed across Europe, including Fennoscandia, Eastern Europe, and more recently, the Macaronesian region. The species typically grows on tree bark in various forest types, but has also been observed on rocks. Its identification often requires a combination of morphological, chemical, and molecular data due to its similarity to other Parmelia species.

== Taxonomy ==
The lichen was described as a new species in 2002 by lichenologists Tassilo Feuerer and Arne Thell. The type specimen was collected from the trunk of European ash (Fraxinus excelsior) in Germany. It is a member of the Parmelia saxatilis species complex; it can be distinguished from that species by its strongly pruinose thallus and isidia. Another member of this complex is Parmelia serrana.

== Habitat and distribution ==
Parmelia ernstiae is widely distributed in Europe and has been recorded in Fennoscandia, including Denmark, southern Finland, and southwestern Sweden. It was reported as new to Norway in 2019, the same year it was reported from Belarus. The eastern limits of its distribution extend to Bosnia-Herzegovina, the Czech Republic, and eastern Germany. In 2023, P. ernstiae was reported for the first time from Madeira, an archipelago of Portugal, expanding its known distribution to the Macaronesian region.

Parmelia ernstiae typically grows on tree bark, although a single specimen from Denmark has been found growing on rock. The species has been observed on various substrates, including the bark of Picea species and Quercus robur, as well as on rocks in Madeira. It can be found in different habitats, such as forests with Picea species, edges of deciduous forests, and even on roadside trees.

The species appears to be adaptable to various environmental conditions, occurring in both forested areas and more open, anthropogenic habitats. Its presence in Madeira suggests that it may have a broader distribution than previously thought, potentially extending to other Atlantic islands or coastal regions with suitable microclimates.

== Description ==
The thallus of Parmelia ernstiae comprises small rounded lobes that rarely overlap each other. In the central parts of the thallus, the lobes are intermixed with isidia. The thallus has a pruinose coating, which helps to distinguish it from P. saxatilis. The lobes of the lookalike Parmelia serrana are larger than those of P. ernstiae, and typically overlap.

== Chemistry ==
Several secondary chemicals have been identified in Parmelia ernstiae, including: salazinic acid (a major compound), atranorin, chloroatranorin, consalazinic acid, lobaric acid, lichesterinic acid, protolichesterinic acid, nephrosterinic acid, and isonephrosterinic acid (all minor compounds). Parmelia ernstiae has the largest set of secondary chemicals in the Parmelia saxatilis group, and can be distinguished from those lookalikes by its secondary chemical composition.
