= Anancaun =

Coordinates: 57.61274°N 5.3078°W

Anancaun: Scottish Gaelic: Àth nan Ceann
- Location within the Highland council area
- OS grid reference: NH025629
- Council area: Highland
- Country: Scotland
- Sovereign state: United Kingdom
- Postcode district: IV22 2
- Police: Scotland
- Fire: Scottish
- Ambulance: Scottish
- UK Parliament: Ross, Skye and Lochaber
- Scottish Parliament: Caithness, Sutherland and Ross

Anancaun (Scottish Gaelic: Àth nan Ceann) is a small hamlet located in Ross-shire, Scotland, within the Scottish council area of Highland.
