= F. W. L. Thomas =

Royal Navy officer, photographer, and historian

Chart of East Loch Tarbert, Isle of Harris, surveyed by Thomas in 1857

Captain Frederick William Leopold Thomas FSA (Scot) (c. 1812–1885) was a Royal Navy officer, photographer, and historian, noted for his surveys of Scotland, and for taking the first photographs of St Kilda.

== Life ==
Thomas was born about 1812, his father George Thomas being a Master in the Royal Navy. He joined his father's surveying ship, HMS Investigator in January 1827. He passed his examination in 1835. He served as mate and assistant surveyor in Investigator, and then in HMS Mastiff, also under his father's command. He was promoted to Lieutenant in 1841, taking command of the Woodlark. He was promoted to Commander in 1860, and retired with the rank of Captain in 1864. He married Frances Sarah Bousfield on 2 December 1841. They had one child, a son, who died in 1850. Thomas died in Edinburgh in 1885.

== Surveying on sea and land ==
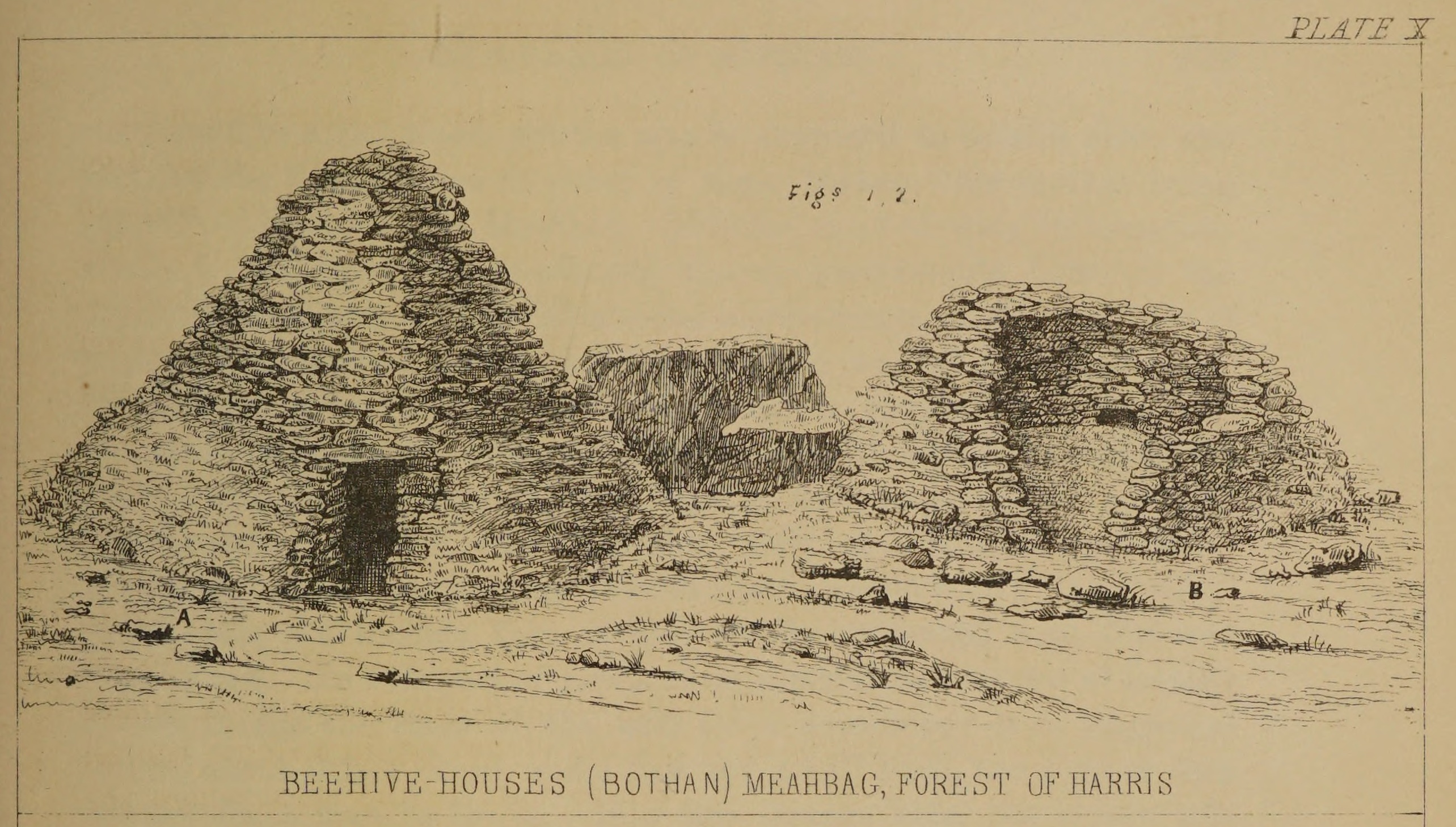
Beehive house on Harris, from Thomas (1862)

His work as a hydrographic surveyor was mainly in Scotland. The earliest work, when he was assisting his father, was in Orkney, and he continued this after his father's death. He was then employed in the Firth of Forth and later in the Western Isles. His surveying work resulted in at least 15 charts and several contributions to Sailing Directions. As well as hydrographic surveying, Thomas carried out important work on the archaeology of the northern and western isles. This involved relatively little excavation, but much surveying and recording. He authored several papers on this work, from 1851, including a plan of the barrows, standing stones and other structures around Stenness, Orkney (Thomas, 1851) which was the first detailed survey of this area; and descriptions of buildings such as black houses, beehive houses and brochs in the Outer Hebrides (Thomas, 1862, 1890).

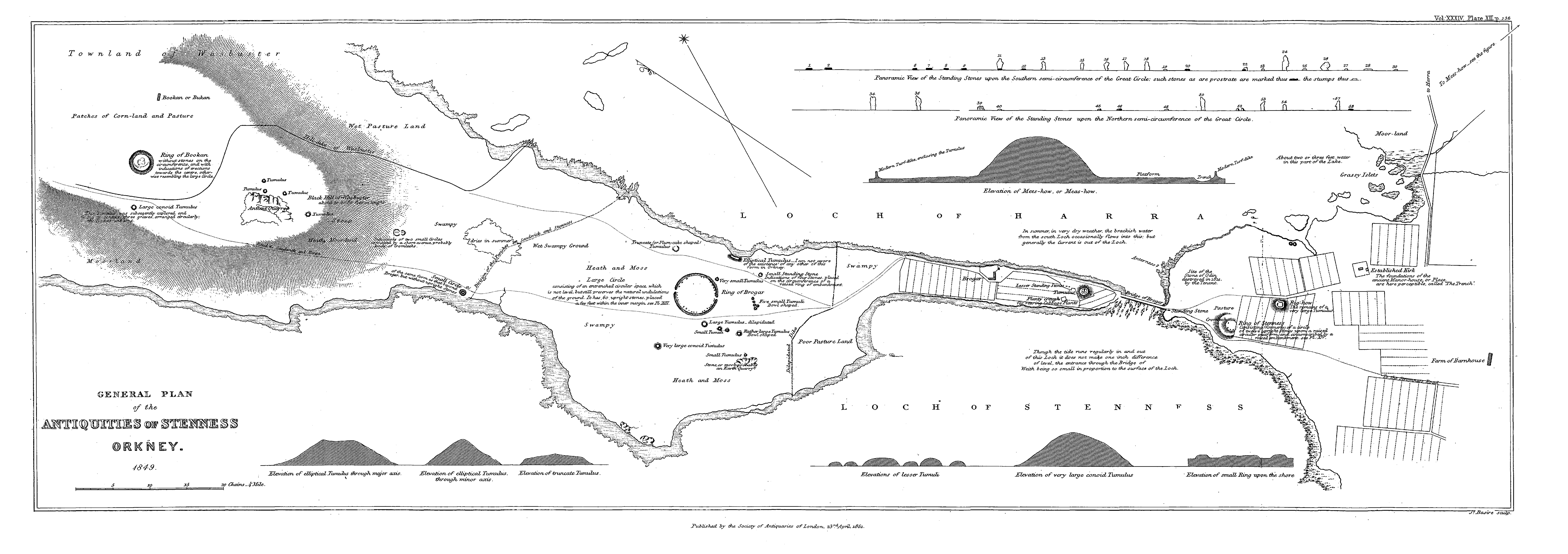

Plan of the antiquities of Stenness, Orkney, from Thomas (1851)

== Naturalist ==
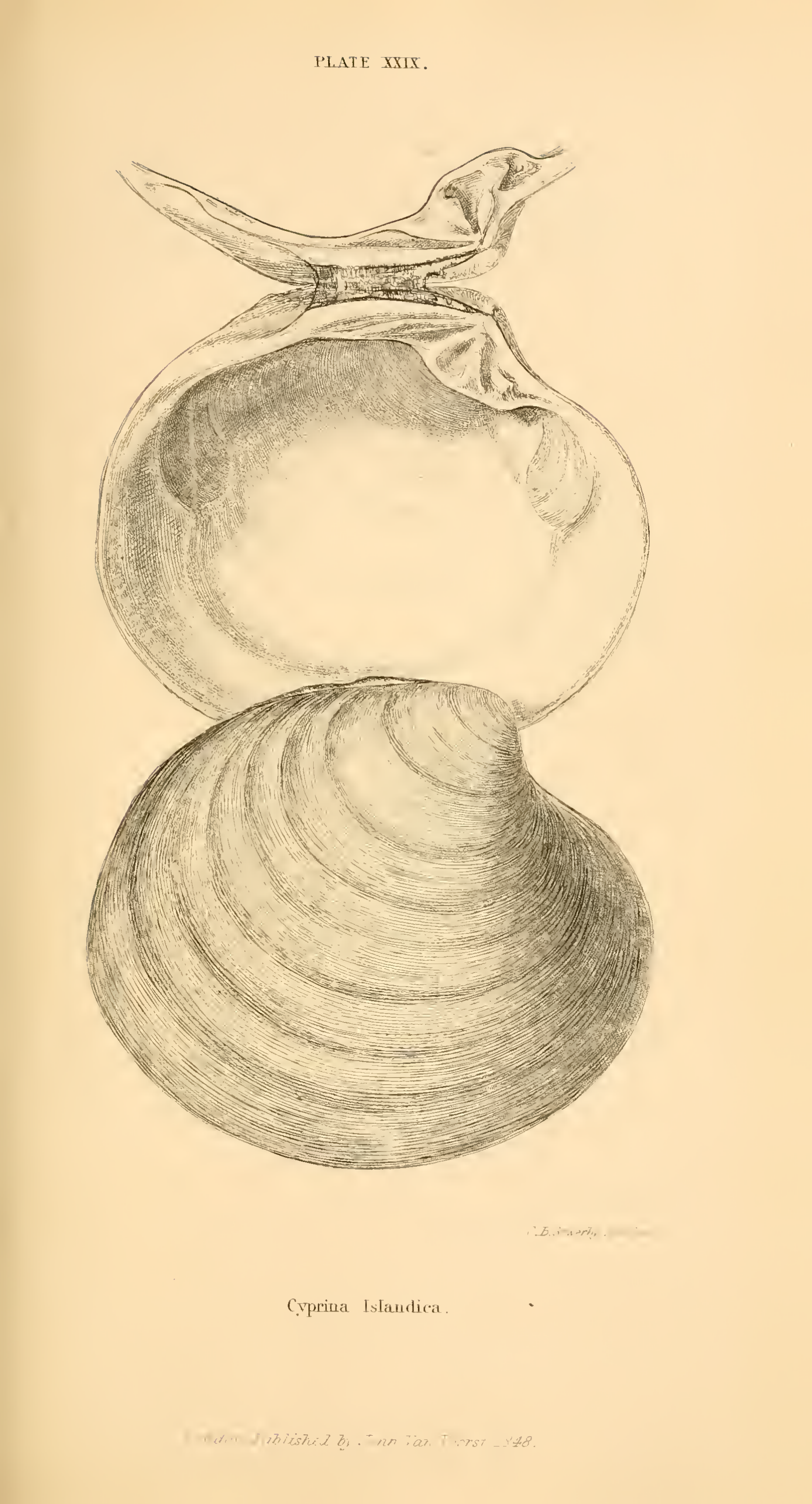
Cyprina Islandica (Arctica islandica) one of the species collected by Thomas in Orkney

Thomas was also important as a naturalist, mainly collecting zoophytes (coelenterates and bryozoa) and molluscs. His specimens are frequently referred to in the major works on zoophytes by Johnston (1847) and on molluscs by Forbes and Hanley (1853) and Jeffreys (1869). Rendall (1956) regarded Thomas as particularly important among the early conchologists, particularly for his work in Orkney. He provided details of the location and depth in which specimens were found, and many of his specimens were of rarer species, indicating that he was familiar with the commoner ones.

== People of the Islands ==
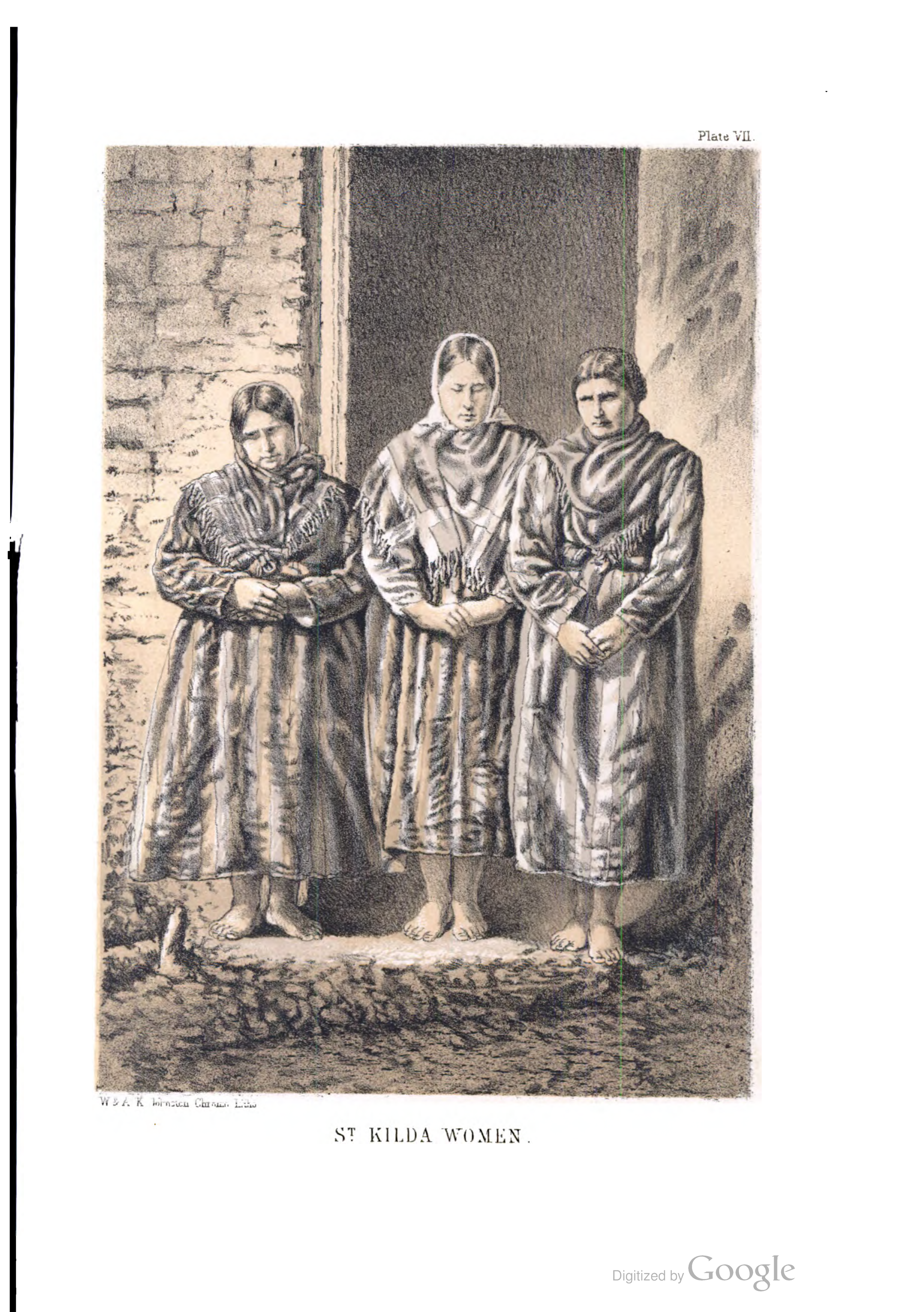
Three St Kilda women, from a photograph by Thomas

Thomas was interested in the people of the islands as well as in the archaeological remains. He noted that some of the beehive houses in Lewis and Harris were still in use as dwellings for the summer pastures, whereas elsewhere in Scotland and Ireland such buildings had been abandoned or were only used for storage. He described the living arrangements in these houses, as well as recounting legends associated with them, such as that of the shape-shifting Each-uisge or water horse (Thomas, 1862). In 1863, in the company of fellow antiquarian Arthur Mitchell on Lewis, he met a stone-breaker eating out of a traditional unglazed earthenware pot, and they investigated the making and use of these vessels, known as craggans. He also collected at least one ballad (Thomas, 1855) and recounted traditional stories of clan warfare and revenge (Thomas, 1878,1880). In 1857 his wife Frances travelled with him to Harris, where they set up home for a while. She was much struck with the poverty of the islanders, exacerbated by their isolation. Frances saw there could be a demand for woollen goods on the mainland, and first promoted knitted stockings, and then together with Lady Dunmore, developed a market for Harris Tweed. Thomas sailed with Captain Otter, on HMS Porcupine, on a voyage to St Kilda in 1860. There he took the earliest photographs ever taken of St Kilda. While on St Kilda, Thomas made the acquaintance of the Rev. Mr. Kennedy, and asked him for information on antiquarian matters. The reply came from his niece, Anne Kennedy, and provides many details.

== Affiliations ==
Thomas was a member of the Photographic Society of Scotland and the Society of Antiquaries of Scotland.

== Modern media ==
In 2004, a television documentary employing Thomas's 1860 photography was broadcast on Grampian Television.

== Bibliography ==
- Thomas, F.W.L. (1851). "Account of some of the Celtic Antiquities of Orkney, including the Stones of Stenness, Tumuli, Picts-houses, &c., with Plans" (PDF). Archaeologia. 34: 88–136. doi:10.1017/S026134090000028X.
- Thomas, F.W.L. (1855). "Shetland Ballad". Proceedings of the Society of Antiquaries of Scotland. 1: 86–89. doi:10.9750/PSAS.001.86.89.
- —— (1862). "Notice of Beehive Houses in Harris and Lewis; with Traditions of the "Each-uisge", or Water-horse, connected". Proceedings of the Society of Antiquaries of Scotland. 3: 127–144. doi:10.9750/PSAS.003.127.144.
- —— (1862). "On the geological age of the pagan monuments of the Outer Hebrides". The Edinburgh New Philosophical Journal. 15: 235–242.
- —— (1870). "On the primitive dwellings and hypogea of the Outer Hebrides". Proceedings of the Society of Antiquaries of Scotland. 7: 153–195. doi:10.9750/PSAS.007.153.195.
- —— (1876). "Analysis of the Ptolemaic Geography of Scotland. With two maps". Proceedings of the Society of Antiquaries of Scotland. 11: 198–225. doi:10.9750/PSAS.011.198.225.
- —— (1878). "Traditions of the Morrisons (Clan Mac Ghillemhuire), Hereditary Judges of Lewis". Proceedings of the Society of Antiquaries of Scotland. 12: 503–556. doi:10.9750/PSAS.012.503.556.
- —— (1880). "Traditions of the Macaulays of Lewis". Proceedings of the Society of Antiquaries of Scotland. 14: 363–431. doi:10.9750/PSAS.014.363.431.
- —— (1882). "On Islay place-names". Proceedings of the Society of Antiquaries of Scotland. 4: 241–276.
- —— (1890). "On the duns of the Outer Hebrides". Archaeologia Scotica. 5: 365–415.
- "The tides among the Orkneys". Tide tables for the British and Irish ports. Hydrographic Office of the Admiralty. 1862. pp. 113–120.
- "Sailing directions for the Orkneys". North Sea Pilot Part I: Shetland and Orkneys (2 ed.). Hydrographic Office of the Admiralty. 1876. pp. 85–186.
- "Sailing directions for the Firth of Forth". North Sea Pilot Part II: North and East Coasts of Scotland (4 ed.). Hydrographic Office of the Admiralty. 1885. pp. 179–247.
