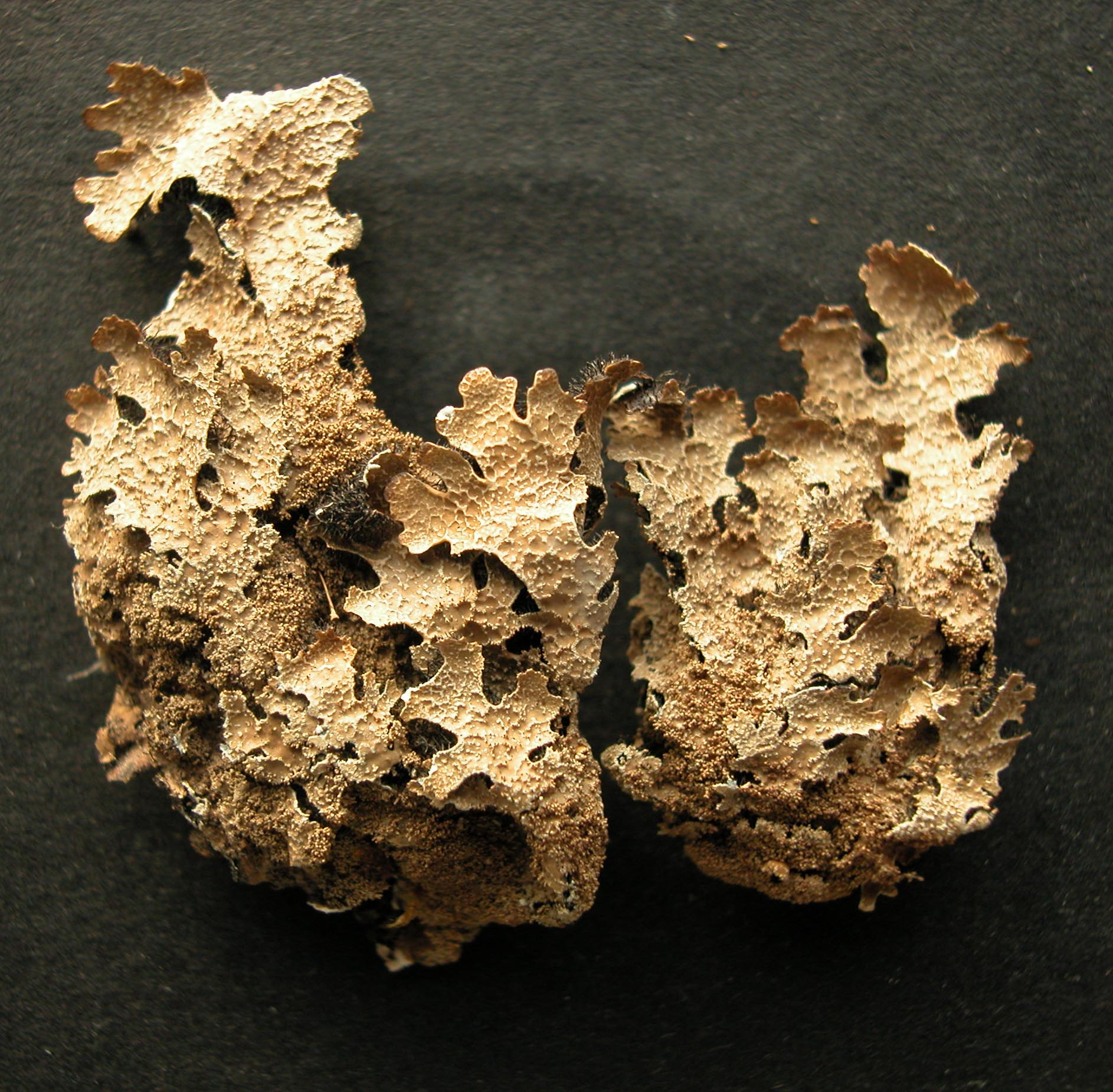
- Herbarium specimen

Scientific classification
- Domain: Eukaryota
- Kingdom: Fungi
- Division: Ascomycota
- Class: Lecanoromycetes
- Order: Lecanorales
- Family: Parmeliaceae
- Genus: Parmelia
- Species: P. serrana

Binomial name
- Parmelia serrana A.Crespo, M.C.Molina & D.Hawksw. (2004)

= Parmelia serrana =

Species of lichen

Parmelia serrana is a species of foliose lichen in the family Parmeliaceae. It is native to Mediterranean regions, particularly in mountainous areas. It is a member of a complex of similar species centred around the common and widespread Parmelia saxatilis. It can be distinguished from these close relatives by the combination of long, sparsely branched lobes, numerous orbicular soralia, small pseudocyphellae, and sparse, mostly simple rhizines.

== Taxonomy ==
Parmelia serrana was described as a new species in 2004 by the lichenologists Ana Crespo, María del Carmen Molina, and David L. Hawksworth. It was identified as distinct from the closely related Parmelia saxatilis based on both morphological differences and molecular phylogenetics involving using the DNA sequences of the internal transcribed spacer and β-tubulin genes. The type specimen was collected in the Sierra de Guadarrama, Spain. The species is common throughout Mediterranean mountainous regions like this.

Parmelia serranais part of a complex group within the genus Parmelia, traditionally difficult to categorise due to their similar morphological features. Molecular analysis has played a crucial role in clarifying these relationships, revealing that P. serrana forms a monophyletic lineage separate from Parmelia saxatilis and other related species. This distinction is supported by significant morphological and ecological differences, despite their close genetic relationships. Phylogenetic studies support the monophyly of P. serrana and its close relationship with P. sulymae, a North American endemic species. The divergence of P. serrana from its relatives is estimated to have occurred during the Pliocene, around 4.78 million years ago.

The species epithet serrana, derived from the Spanish adjective serrano, meaning 'from the mountains', alludes to the species' typical habitat in the sierras of the Mediterranean region, highlighting its ecological and geographical specificity.

== Description ==
Parmelia serrana features a crustose, epilithic thallus that is closely adpressed to the substrate and forms orbicular patches up to 15 cm in diameter. The thallus consists of overlapping (imbricate) lobes, which are typically 2.5–6 mm wide, apically rounded to sublinear, and show a pale greenish grey to whitish grey colour. The surface is shiny and may become reticulately cracked as it ages.

Pseudocyphellae (tiny pores for gas exchange) are numerous and mainly linear to irregularly shaped, scattered across the lamina. Over time, the pseudocyphellae become sorediate, forming orbicular to linear soralia with eroded centres as they age. Isidia are densely packed on older parts of the thallus, cylindrical in shape, and simple to branched. The lower surface has sparse to moderately abundant, simple to sparsely branched rhizines, which measure 1–1.5 mm long.

Apothecia (fruiting bodies) are fairly common, subpedicellate, with a disc that is initially concave, expanding to 1–4 mm in diameter. Ascospores are broadly ellipsoid, measuring 17–18 by 12–13 μm.

Chemical spot tests on the thallus reveal a cortex that reacts K+ (yellow); the medulla shows a K+ (yellow then red) reaction, C−, PD+ (red-orange). Known chemical constituents include atranorin, chloroatranorin, salazinic acid, consalazinic acid, and trace amounts of protocetraric acid.

== Similar species ==
Parmelia serrana is often compared to P. saxatilis due to their visual similarities. However, it can be distinguished by its rounded, not truncated lobe tips and specific molecular sequences in ITS and β-tubulin regions. Parmelia saxatilis typically has narrower, more adnate lobes and a darker colouration, particularly at the lobe margins.

== Habitat and distribution ==
Parmelia serrana grows on deciduous and coniferous trees, and less frequently on mossy rocks. It is particularly prevalent on Pinus sylvestris and various species of Quercus (oak). The species is widespread in the Sierra del Guadarrama and other mountain ranges within its native Mediterranean and submediterranean zones, from approximately 300 to 1700 metres in elevation.

In terms of its geographic spread, Parmelia serrana is found in Africa (notably the Canary Islands) and across Europe. While it is prevalent in Mediterranean mountains, its full distribution in Europe remains partially understood, with occurrences noted at lower altitudes in more temperate, somewhat continental regions like Austria. The species is well-adapted to the Iberian Peninsula and the Canary Islands and is successful in colonising a range of habitats within these regions.
