= Harris tweed =

Type of handwoven cloth

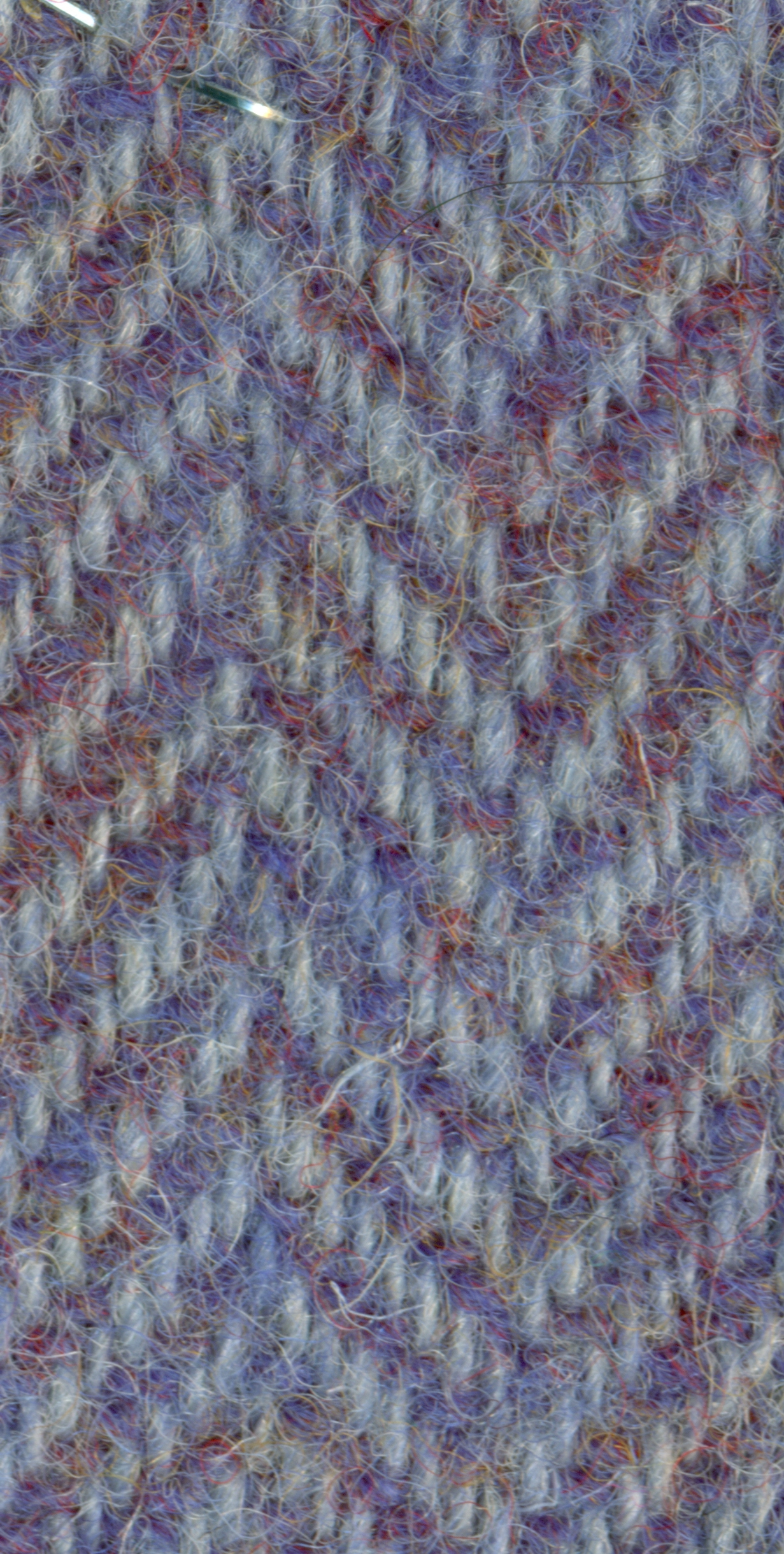
Harris tweed, herringbone pattern

Harris tweed (Scottish Gaelic: Clò mór or Clò hearach) is a tweed cloth that is handwoven by islanders at their homes in the Outer Hebrides of Scotland, finished in the Outer Hebrides, and made from pure virgin wool dyed and spun in the Outer Hebrides. This definition, quality standards and protection of the Harris tweed name are enshrined in the Harris Tweed Act 1993.

== Etymology ==
The original name of tweed fabric was "tweel", the Scots word for twill, as the fabric was woven in a twill weave rather than a plain (or tabby) weave. A number of theories exist as to how and why "tweel" became corrupted into "tweed"; in one, a London merchant in the 1830s, upon receiving a letter from a Hawick firm inquiring after "tweels", misinterpreted the spelling as a trade name taken from the River Tweed, which flows through the Scottish Borders. Subsequently, the goods were advertised as "tweed", the name used ever since.

== History ==
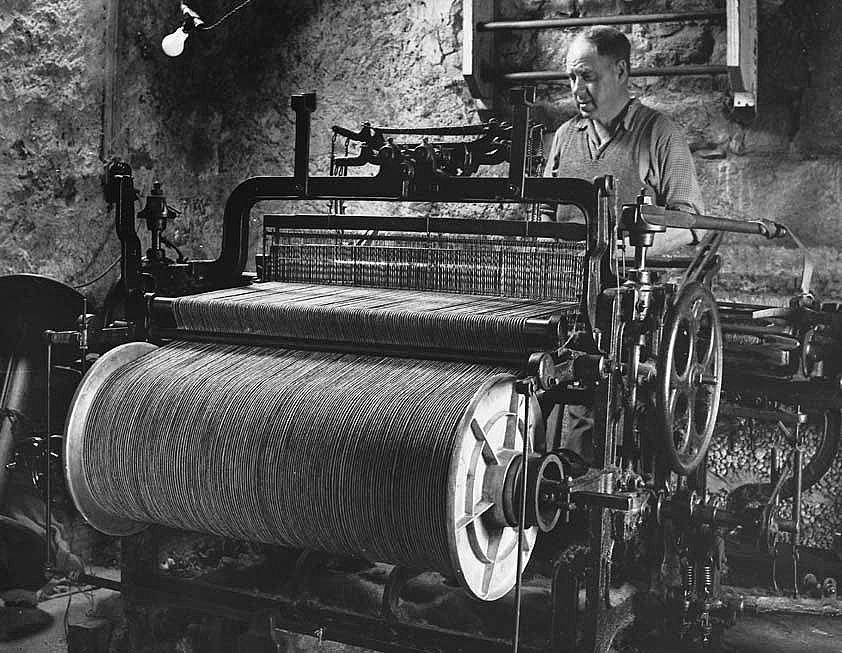
Harris tweed weaver, c. 1960

For centuries, the islanders of Lewis and Harris, the Uists, Benbecula and Barra wove cloth known as clò-mòr (lit. 'big cloth' in Scottish Gaelic) by hand. Originally woven by crofters, this cloth was woven for personal and practical uses and was ideal protection against the often cold climate of northern Scotland. The cloth was also used for trade or barter, eventually becoming a form of currency amongst islanders; it was not unusual for rents to be paid in blankets or lengths of clò-mòr.

By the end of the 18th century, the spinning of wool yarn from local raw materials had become a staple industry for crofters. Finished handmade cloth was exported to the Scottish mainland and traded, along with other commodities produced by the Islanders, such as goat and deer skins.

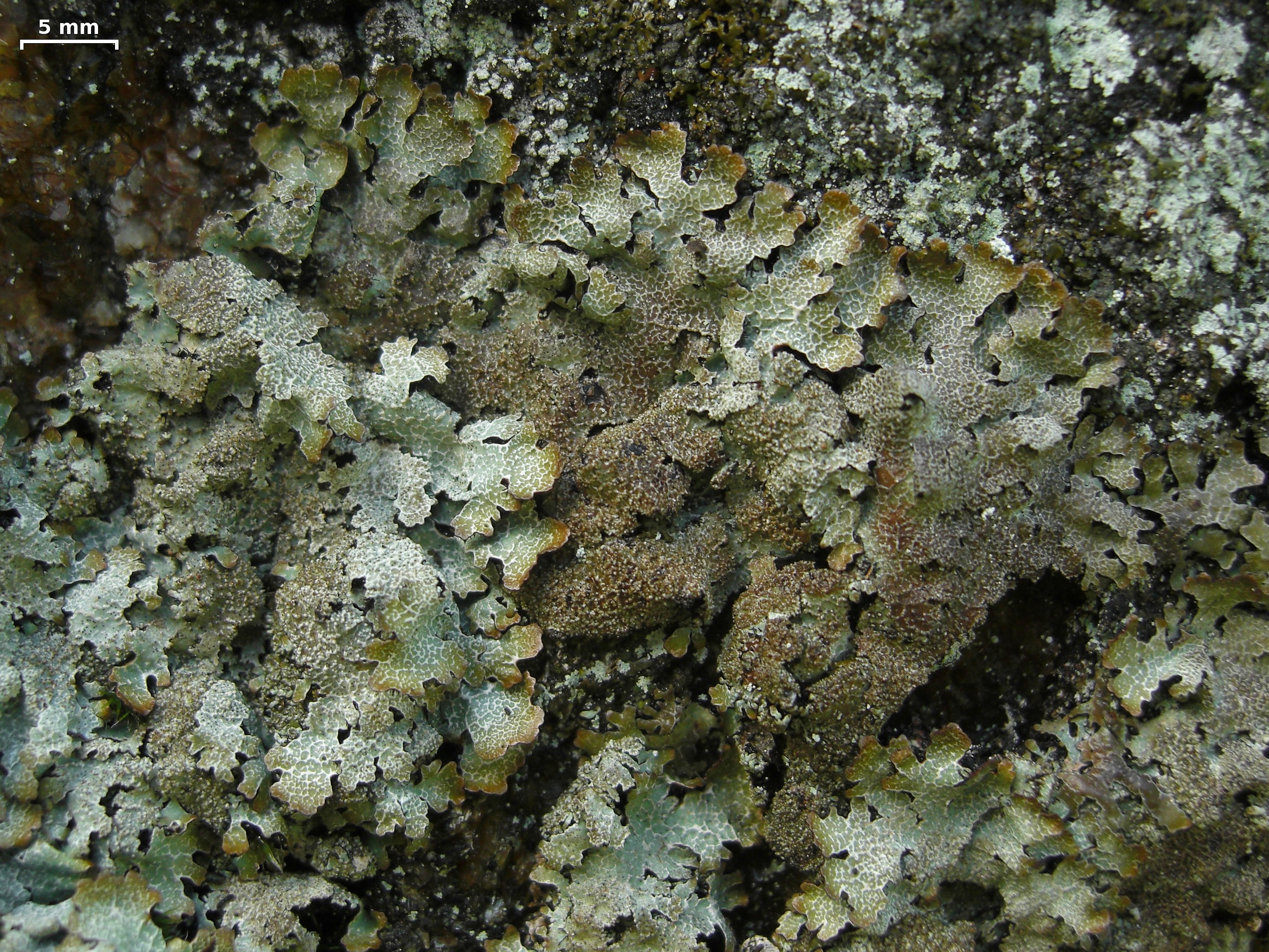
The lichen Parmelia saxatilis, a lichen known as "crottle", gave a deep red colour and distinctive scent to older Harris tweed fabrics.

As the Industrial Revolution reached Scotland, mainland manufacturers developed mechanised weaving methods, with weavers in the Outer Hebrides retaining their traditional processes. The islanders of Lewis and Harris had long been known for the quality of their handwoven fabrics, but up to the middle of the nineteenth century, this fabric was produced mainly for either home use or for trade and barter at the local market.

When Alexander Murray, 6th Earl of Dunmore, inherited the North Harris Estate from his father in 1836, production of tweed in Outer Hebrides was still entirely manual. Wool was washed in soft, peaty water before being dyed using dyestuffs derived from local plants and lichens. It was then processed and spun, before being hand woven by the crofters in their cottages.

Traditional island tweed was characterised by the flecks of colour achieved through the use of natural dyes, including the lichen known as "crottle" (Parmelia saxatilis and Parmelia omphalodes), which gave the fabric deep red or purple-brown and rusty orange colours respectively. The use of these lichens also resulted in a distinctive scent that made older Harris tweed fabrics easily identifiable.

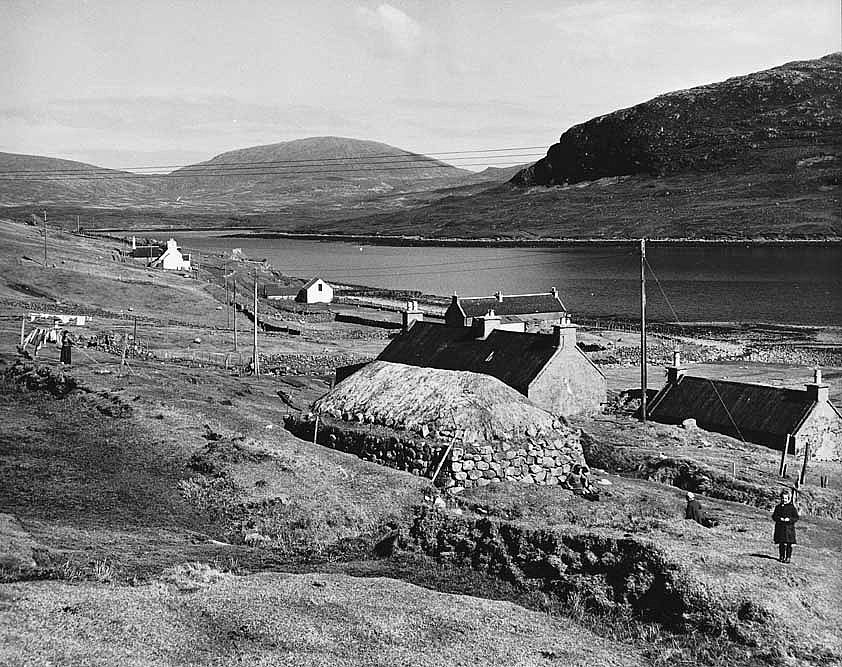
A crofting village on the Isle of Lewis

Upon the death of Murray in 1843, responsibility for his estate on the Isle of Harris passed to his wife, Lady Catherine Herbert. Herbert noticed the marketing potential and high quality of the tweed cloth produced locally by two sisters from the village of Strond. Known as the Paisley Sisters after the town where they had trained, the fabric woven by them was of a remarkably higher quality than that produced by untrained crofters. In 1846, the Countess commissioned the sisters to weave lengths of tweed with the Murray family tartan. She sent the finished fabric to be made up into jackets for the gamekeepers and ghillies on her estate. Being hardwearing and water resistant, the new clothing was highly suited to life on the Dunmores' estate. Her ideas were complemented by the work of "Fanny" Beckett. She organised the weavers, created training and quality control procedures, and promoted Harris tweed as a sustainable and local industry.

The Countess began to promote the local textile as a fashionable cloth for hunting and sporting wear. It soon became the fabric of choice for the landed gentry and aristocracy of the time, including members of Queen Victoria’s inner circle. With demand established for this high quality "Harris tweed", Lady Catherine sent more girls to the Scottish mainland for training. She improved the yarn production process to create a more consistent, workable cloth and by the late 1840s, merchants from Edinburgh to London were supplying the privileged classes with hand-woven Harris tweed.

"Fanny" Beckett moved to London in 1888 and the "Scottish Home Industries", which managed the new product, became a limited company in 1896.

From this point on, the Harris tweed industry grew, reaching a peak production figure of 7.6 million yards in 1966.

== Harris Tweed Authority ==
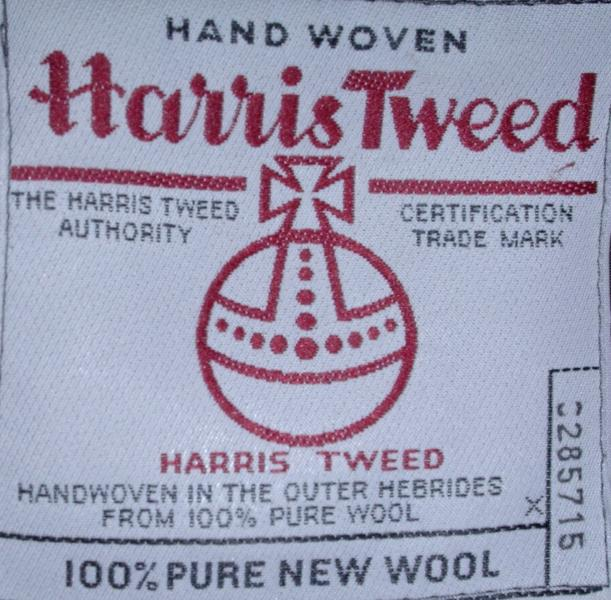
The Harris Tweed Orb Mark

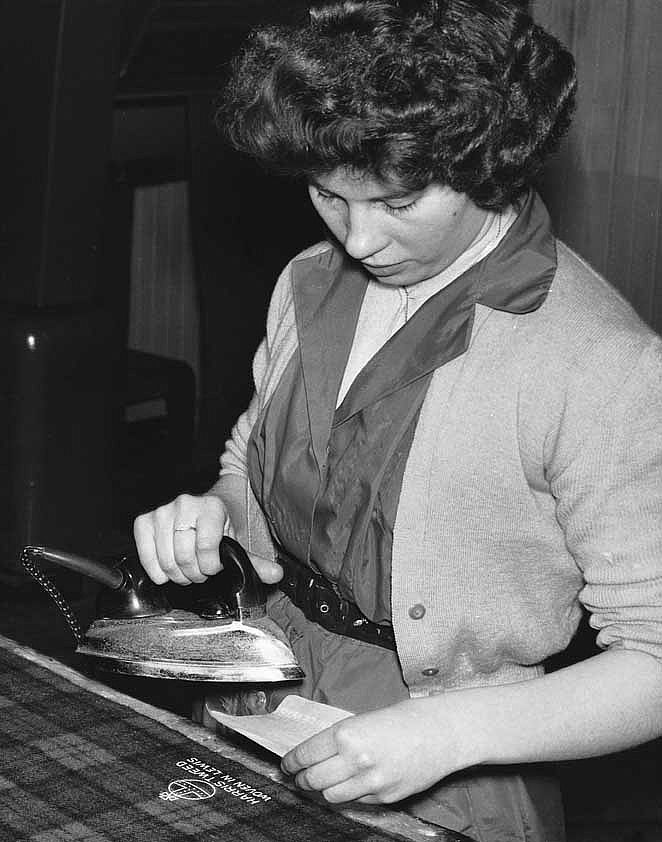
Stamping Harris tweed with the Orb Mark

As the demand for Harris tweed expanded in the first decade of the 20th century, there was an influx of weavers into the industry seeking a wage and soon a poorer quality tweed was being made by inexperienced weavers from imported, mainland mill-spun yarn, giving rise to the pejorative name of 'Stornoway tweed'. This inferior tweed affected the market for traditional Harris tweed made by experienced weavers from hand-spun yarn.

Legal protection of the name of Harris tweed by a trade mark and an established standard definition became essential. Groups of merchants in both Lewis and Harris applied to the Board of Trade for a registered trade mark. When this trade mark, the Orb, was eventually granted, the board insisted that it should be granted to all the islands of the Outer Hebrides i.e. to Lewis, North and South Uist, Benbecula and Barra, as well as to Harris, the rationale for this decision being that the tweed was made in exactly the same way in all those islands.

In 1909, after much negotiation and a degree of acrimony from merchants in Harris who felt that the trade mark should have been granted exclusively to Harris, the Orb Trade Mark was granted. The Harris Tweed Association, a voluntary body, was formed to protect both the use of the Orb Trade Mark and to protect the use of the name ‘Harris tweed’ from imitations.

The original definition attached to the Orb Trade Mark stated that: Harris tweed means a tweed, hand-spun, hand-woven and dyed by the crofters and cottars in the Outer Hebrides.

In 1993, a new statutory body to guard the Orb Trade Mark, the Harris Tweed Authority, replaced the original Harris Tweed Association. Also in 1993, an Act of Parliament, the Harris Tweed Act 1993, established the Harris Tweed Authority as the successor to the Harris Tweed Association, its purpose being "to promote and maintain the authenticity, standard and reputation of Harris tweed; for preventing the sale as Harris tweed of material which does not fall within the definition...".

The following definition of genuine Harris tweed became statutory: "Harris tweed means a tweed which has been hand woven by the islanders at their homes in the Outer Hebrides, finished in the islands of Harris, Lewis, North Uist, Benbecula, South Uist and Barra and their several purtenances (The Outer Hebrides) and made from pure virgin wool dyed and spun in the Outer Hebrides".

Today, every 50 metres of Harris tweed are checked by an inspector from the Harris tweed Authority before being stamped, by hand, with the Orb Mark.

The Harris Tweed Authority is the legally appointed governing body responsible for upholding the integrity of Harris tweed in accordance with the Harris Tweed Act 1993. It is involved in instigating litigation, issuing of the Orb Stamp, inspection of mills and weavers sheds, promotion of the industry and safeguarding Harris tweed on behalf of the islanders of the Outer Hebrides. Based in the island capital of Stornoway the Authority consists of a chief executive, secretary and two inspectors and stampers. There is also an overseeing board of unpaid members and a legal team in support.

== Harris tweed mills ==
There are three mills operating on the islands, each with a public-facing company associated with them. The companies handle marketing, sales, customer service and distribution of Harris tweed to customers while their mills handle certain aspects of the production process.

- The Kenneth Mackenzie Ltd mill, located in Stornoway, is the oldest of the current [as of when?] producers in the Outer Hebrides and has been making Harris tweed since 1906. Since 2019 the mill has been owned by Alexander Lockerby, who had previously managed the mill.
- The Carloway Mill is an independent wholesale producer of Harris tweed in the village of Carloway and the smallest of the three existing Harris Tweed textile mills. It uses traditional craft machinery to produce a unique, individualistic and bespoke Harris tweed cloth. The mill owners announced in January 2016 that they were seeking a buyer for the business and as such the future of the mill was uncertain.
- Harris Tweed Hebrides, who reopened a disused mill in Shawbost in November 2007. The main shareholder in the company is Ian Taylor, a Scottish businessman who had spent thirty years in the oil industry.

== Weavers ==
All weavers are self-employed and can work as a 'mill weaver' commissioned by any of the three mills or as an 'independent weaver' making and selling their own cloth, sometimes on private commission. Mill weavers are supplied with beamed warps and yarn directly from the mills along with instructions on how the cloth must be woven. Once the tweed is woven, it is collected by the mill for finishing and stamping, and is then sold by the mill. Independent weavers on the other hand must purchase yarn from the mills and warp it themselves, often to their own design. The independent weaver then sends their woven cloth to the mill for finishing and stamping (which they pay for as a service) before it is returned to the weaver to sell for themselves. A weaver can work both as a mill weaver and an independent weaver.

Harris Tweed Industry Liaison Group meets regularly to discuss issues facing the industry and consists of a range of interested parties such as mill owners, weaver representatives, HTA officials, funding bodies, local council members, buyers and other industry figures.

== Production processes ==
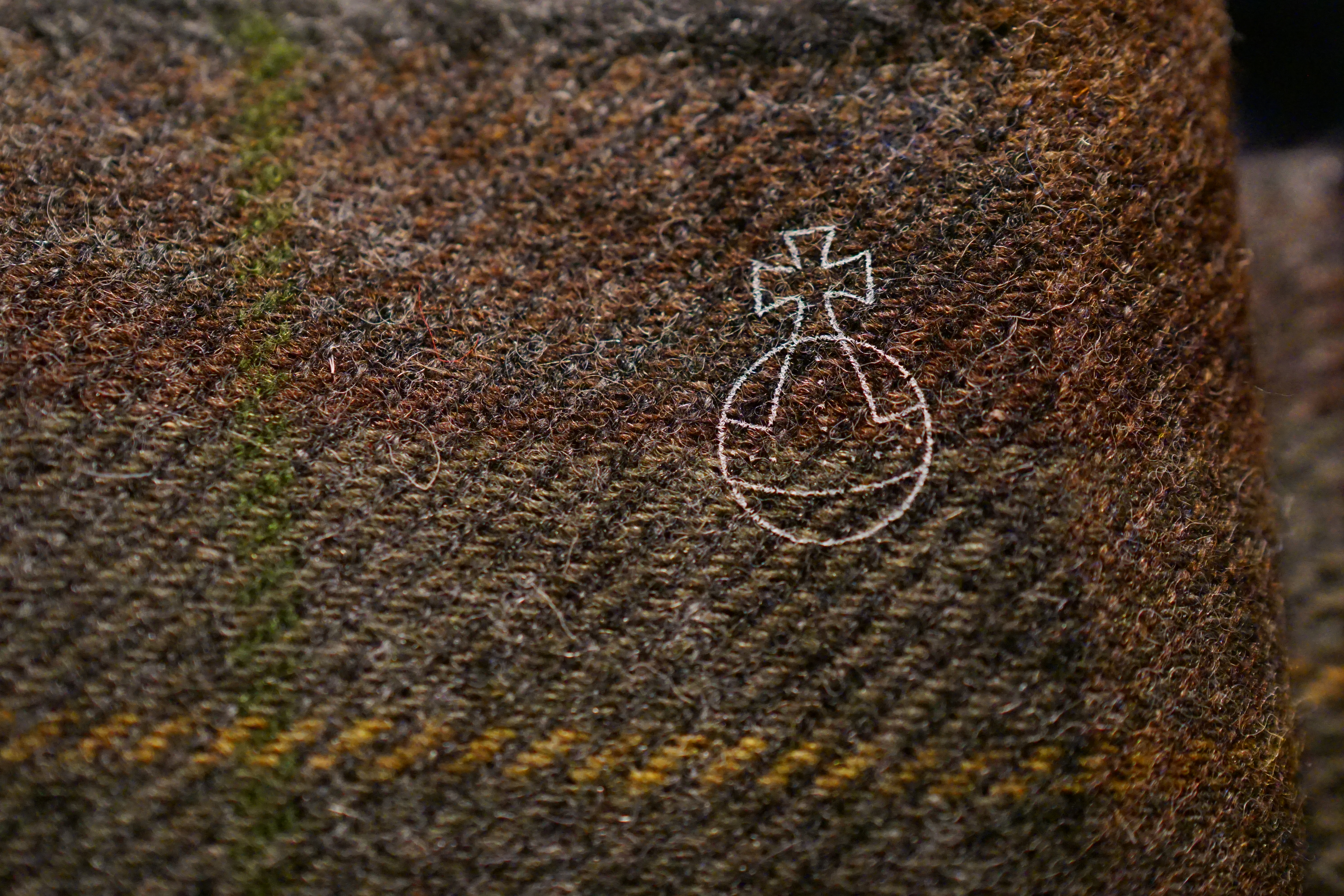
The Orb stamp on Harris tweed

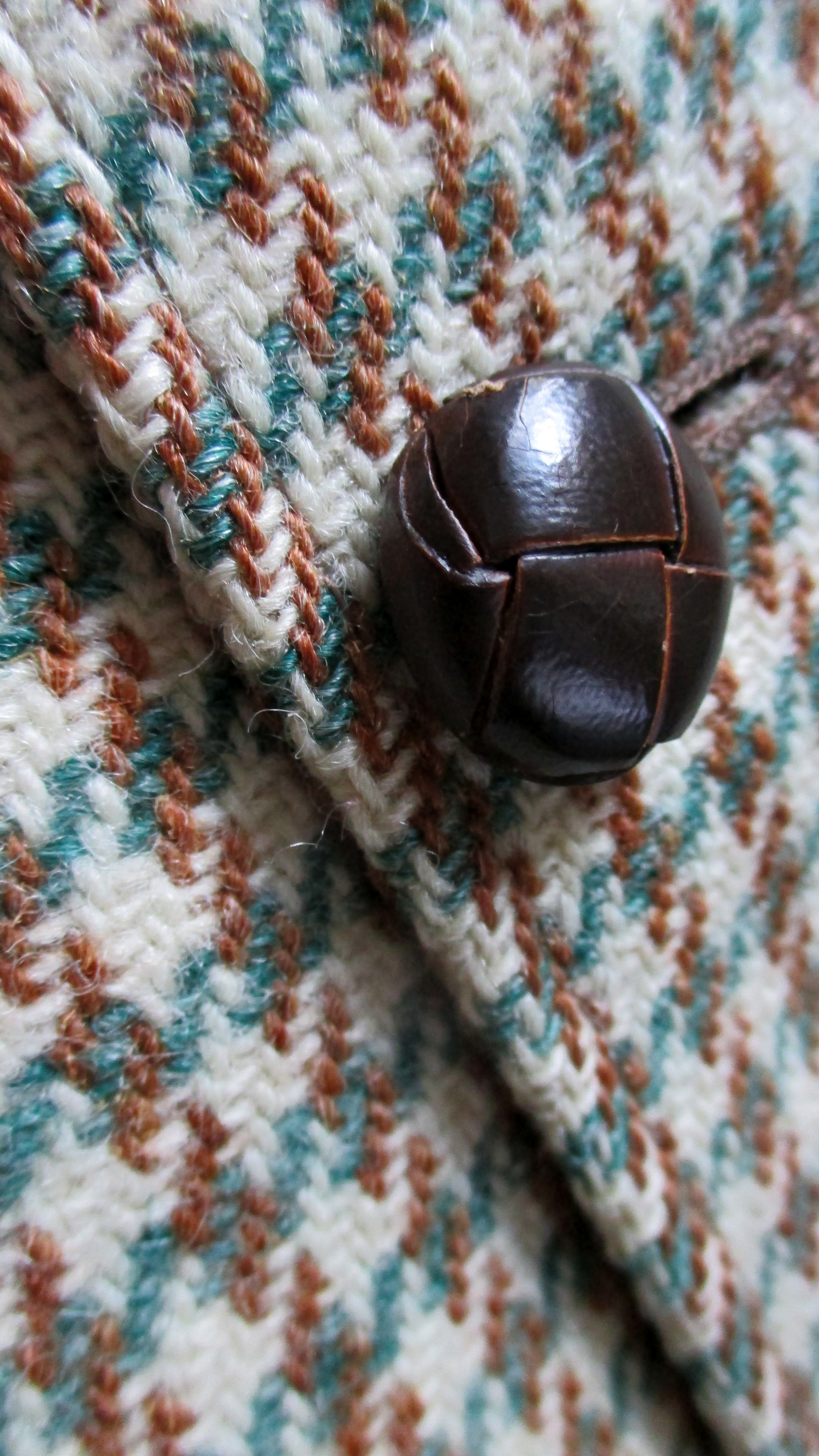
Harris tweed jacket

The creation of Harris tweed begins with fleeces of pure virgin wools which are shorn from Cheviot and Scottish Blackface sheep. Although most of the wool is grown principally on the UK mainland, in the early summer the island communities still join to round up and shear the local sheep to add to the mix. The two types of wool are blended together to gain the advantages of their unique qualities and characteristics.

Once shorn the wool is scoured before being delivered in large bales to the mills of the main tweed producers where it is then dyed in a wide variety of colours for blending.

The freshly dyed coloured and white wools are weighed in predetermined proportions and then thoroughly blended by hand to exact recipes to obtain the correct hue. It is then carded between mechanical, toothed rollers which tease and mix the fibers thoroughly before it is separated into a fragile, embryonic yarn. This soft yarn then has a twist imparted to it as it is spun to give it maximum strength for weaving. The spun yarn is wound onto bobbins to provide the ingredients of weft (left-to-right threads) and warp (vertical threads) supplied to the weavers.

This vitally important process sees thousands of warp threads gathered in long hanks in very specific order and wound onto large beams ready to be delivered, together with yarn for the weft, to the weavers.

All Harris tweed is hand woven on a treadle loom at each weaver's home on a 'double-width' Bonas-Griffith rapier loom in the case of mill weavers, or normally an older 'single width' Hattersley loom in the case of independent weavers. The weaver will 'tie in' their warp by threading each end of yarn through the eyelets of their loom's heddles in a specific order then begins to weave, fixing any mistakes or breakages that occur until completed.

The tweed then returns to the mill in its 'greasy state' and here it passes through the hands of darners who correct any flaws.

Once ready the cloth is finished. Dirt, oil and other impurities are removed by washing and beating in soda and soapy water before it is dried, steamed, pressed and cropped.

The final process is the examination by the independent Harris Tweed Authority which visits the mills weekly, before application of their Orb Mark trademark which is ironed on to the fabric as a seal of authenticity.

== Harris tweed today ==
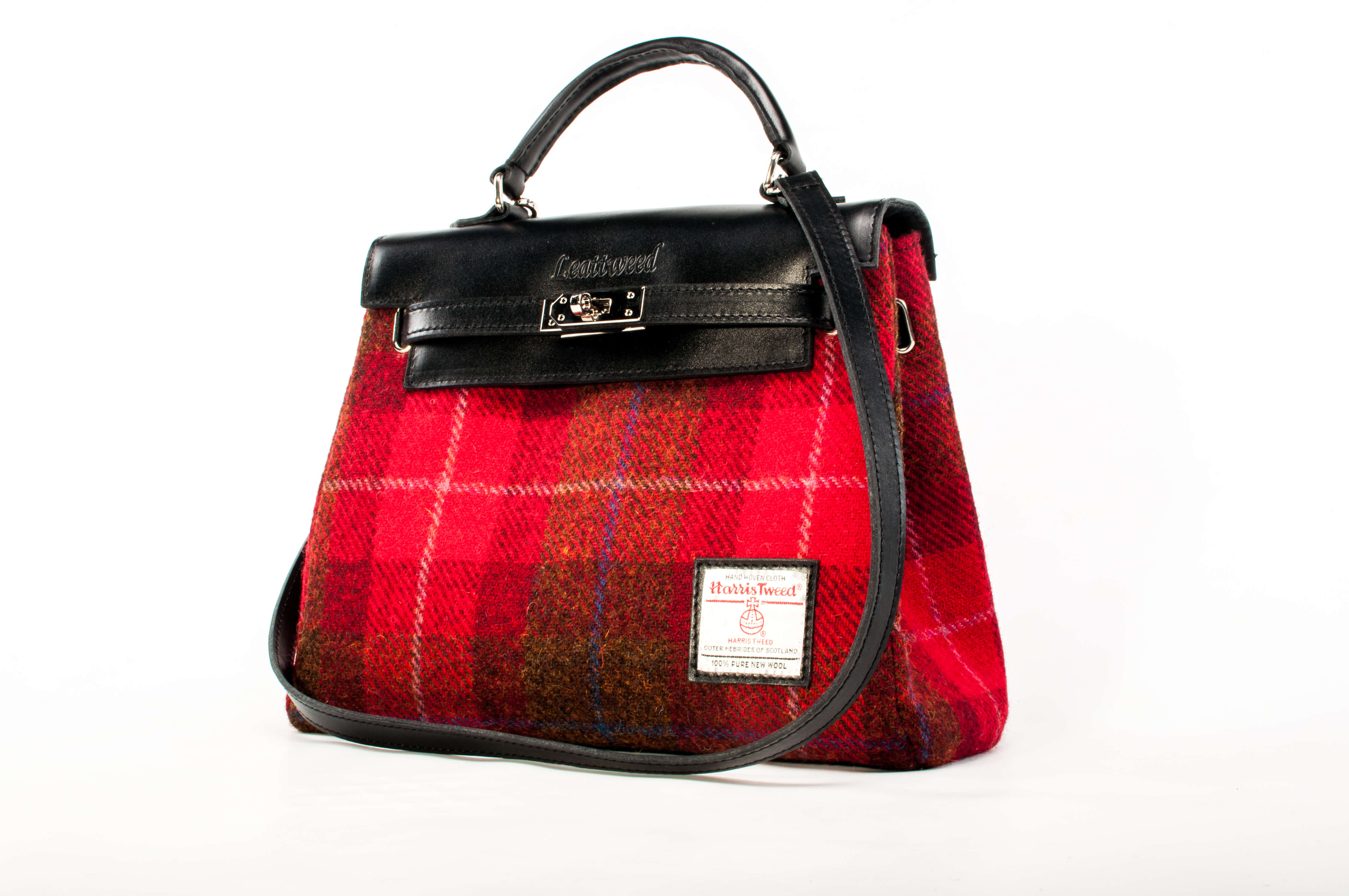
Handbag made using Harris tweed

In 2012 the weavers and mills of the Harris tweed industry produced one million metres of Harris tweed, compared to 450,000 metres in 2009, which was the highest production figures in 17 years. The last three years have seen Harris tweed remain "on-trend" and a regular feature in both High Street stores and on catwalks in couture collections and the increase in popularity has led to the training of a new generation of weavers to meet production demands.

Menswear brands such as Tommy Bahama, Topman, Barutti, Brooks Brothers, Nordstrom, Thomas Pink, J. Crew, Nigel Cabourn, Hugo Boss, Paul Smith, Primark and Prince of Scots use the fabric for jackets, outerwear and suiting.

Footwear brands have also used Harris tweed, most notably Nike, Dr Martens, Aigle, Red Wing Shoes, and Clarks. The luxury interiors market is also expanding following the use of over 90,000 metres of Harris tweed in Glasgow's 5-star Blythswood Square Hotel in 2008.

New markets are emerging within the BRICS nations and more traditional markets are reviving in the USA and Europe, as well as East Asian countries, including South Korea. Sales forecasts are optimistic for the cloth.

== See also ==
- Traditional dyes of the Scottish Highlands
