= Chiefs of Clan Fraser =

List of chiefs of the Scottish clan

The following is a list of the chiefs of the Clan Fraser of Lovat. The Chiefs of Clan Fraser often use the Gaelic patronym MacShimidh.

No.	Name	Died	Details
I	Sir Simon de Fraser	1306	Known as the Patriot, he led the clan during the Wars of Scottish Independence, fought at the Battle of Dunbar in 1296 and was hanged, drawn and quartered.
II	Simon Fraser of Lovat	1333	Cousin of I. Led the clan at the Battle of Halidon Hill in which he was killed. All subsequent chiefs were known as MacShimidh 'son of Simon'.
III	Simon Fraser of Lovat	1347	Son of II. Fought at the Battle of Durham in which he was killed.
IV	Hugh Fraser of Lovat	1397	Son of III.
V	Alexander Fraser of Lovat	1415	Son of III.
VI	Hugh Fraser of Lovat	1440	Son of IV. Held the office of High Sheriff of Inverness-shire in 1431.
VII	Hugh Fraser of Lovat	1450	Son of VI.
VIII	Hugh Fraser, 1st Lord Lovat	1501	Son of VII. Made a Lord of Parliament in 1458 in Scottish Peerage.
IX	Thomas Fraser, 2nd Lord Lovat	1524	Son of VIII. Held the office of Justiciar of the Highlands.
X	Hugh Fraser, 3rd Lovat Lovat	1544	Son of IX. Killed fighting against the MacDonalds and Camerons at the Battle of the Shirts.
XI	Alexander Fraser, 4th Lord Lovat	1557	Son of X. In 1555 he waited on Mary of Guise when she came to Inverness to hold assizes
XII	Hugh Fraser, 5th Lord Lovat	1576	Son of XI. Known as Red Hugh, in 1562 he met Mary, Queen of Scots at Inverness and was made Captain of Inverness Castle.
XIII	Simon Fraser, 6th Lord Lovat	1633	Son of XII. Served at the Court of James I.
XIV	Hugh Fraser, 7th Lord Lovat	1646	Son of XIII.
XV	Hugh Fraser, 8th Lord Lovat	1672	Grandson of XIV.
XVI	Hugh Fraser, 9th Lord Lovat	1696	Son of XV. Married Lady Amelia Murray, daughter of the Duke of Atholl, who as a widow was later abducted by the Old Fox XVII Chief.
XVII	Thomas Fraser, 10th Lord Lovat	1699	Son of XIV. Supported the Royalists during the Wars of the Three Kingdoms.
XVIII	Simon Fraser, 11th Lord Lovat	1747	Son of XVII. Most famous chief in clan history, known as the Fox, he was executed for treason in 1747 for his part in the 1745 Jacobite Rising.
XIX	Simon Fraser of Lovat	1782	Son of XVIII. General who served in the Seven Years' War and American Revolutionary War.
XX	Archibald Campbell Fraser of Lovat (Note: Archibald Campbell Fraser died in 1815, aged 79. All 5 of his children predeceased him. The Chiefs reverted to the Strichen line via the second son of Alexander Fraser, 4th Lord Lovat.)	1815	Son of XVIII. Served as British Consul at Tripoli and Algiers.
XXI	Thomas Fraser, 12th Lord Lovat	1875	Cousin of XX. Descended of the Frasers of Strichen, also created 1st Baron Lovat in the peerage of the United Kingdom.
XXII	Simon Fraser, 13th Lord Lovat	1887	Son of XXI. Served as Lt.-Col. of the Queen's Own Cameron Highlanders and was aide-de-camp to Queen Victoria.
XXIII	Simon Joseph Fraser, 14th Lord Lovat	1933	Son of XXII. Fought in the Second Boer War and World War I, and formed the Lovat Scouts.
XXIV	Simon Christopher Joseph Fraser, 15th Lord Lovat	1995	Son of XXII. Famously led the Commando 4 Brigade during Operation Overlord of World War II, accompanied by his piper. Churchill described him as the handsomest man to slit a throat, and Hitler had 100k marks on his head, dead or alive.
XXV	Simon Christopher Joseph Fraser, 16th Lord Lovat		Grandson of XXIV. Married Petra Palumbo in 2016.

== Two Chiefs dispute ==
On 1 May 1984, by decree of the Court of the Lord Lyon, the 21st Lady Saltoun was made "Chief of the name and arms of the whole Clan Fraser". The Lord Lyon did not grant the Chiefship of the Clan Fraser, simply a description of "Chief of the name and arms." The Lord Lyon does not have power over the Chiefship of a Highland Clan. Since this decree, there has been much confusion as to the Chiefship of the Clan Fraser.

When Simon the Pater's descendants first acquired the Lovat lands of the Ard, in the Highlands, they took to the Gaelic customs of the area. This included everything from language, ways of warfare, to clothing and fashion, even giving their children Gaelic names. By the time Simon's son came of age to lead the family, he was deemed to be the 1st Chief of Clan Fraser, the MacShimidh.

Frasers who stayed in the Lowlands, however, maintained Teutonic (Germanic), or Norman culture. They took no part in Clan warfare, spoke Scots, and dressed like Lowlanders. According to Alexander Fraser, 18th Lord Saltoun, his family "continued to have their principal seat in the Lowlands, and those of the surname who remained in that section of Scotland, where Teutonic institutions prevailed, and whence the patriarchal system of Clans and Clanships had long been banished, had nothing to do with the origin or formation of the Highland Clan, and never belonged to it."

According to the Lady Saltoun, his descendant, "The Frasers of Philorth, the Lords Saltoun, being the senior line, are Chiefs of the name of Fraser, although a lowland family. Lord Lovat is Chief of the very numerous Highland Clan Fraser of Lovat, based in Inverness-shire."

The Lady Saltoun was not a descendant of the Shimidh, the Simon from whom the Clan Fraser traces its lineage, being descended from the Shimidh's older brother. So, though the Lord Lovat is still the Chieftain of Clan Fraser, the MacShimidh, the Lord Lyon has made official the seniority of the Lady Saltoun's line.

The selection of a clan chieftain is traditionally very different than the Teutonic/Norman system of inherited titles. A Clan would elect and follow whatever chief it chose. The Lyon Court decree has introduced a lack of clarity into the Clan's organisation.

== Arms of the Lords Lovat, Chiefs of the Clan Fraser of Lovat ==
Coat of arms of Chiefs of Clan Fraser
Adopted c. 1253 Crest Issuant from a ducal coronet Or, a stag's head erased; Torse Mantling gules and ermine, for a peer of the UK Helm Upon a coronet of a baron of the UK/Lord of Parliament of Scotland Proper, the helm of a nobleman argent with bars or. Escutcheon Blazon: Quarterly 1st & 4th Azure three fraises Argent 2nd & 3rd Argent three antique crowns Gules. Supporters two stags; Motto JE SUIS PREST Badge Clan member crest badge - Clan Fraser of lovat.svg Symbolism * "Strawberry" in French is fraise (feminine), and its pronunciation is close to that of Fraser. The strawberry plant, used in the coat of arms of the Fraser Clan of the Scottish Lowlands as well as in the Frasers of Lovat in the Highlands, is called a fraisier.: The Fraser motto, "Je suis prest" uses an ancient spelling. In modern French spelling, the "s" has disappeared and a circumflex is on top of the "e" ("je suis prêt").

== See also ==
- Lord Lovat
- Lord Saltoun
