= Thomas Fraser, 2nd Lord Lovat =

- Died: 21 October 1524
- Title: Lord (Fraser) of Lovat
- Predecessor: Hugh Fraser, 1st Lord Lovat
- Successor: Hugh Fraser, 3rd Lord Lovat
- Spouse(s): Janet Gordon; Janet Gray (d. c.1550)
- Parent(s): Hugh Fraser, 1st Lord Lovat; Violetta Lyon

Thomas Fraser, 2nd Lord Lovat (died 21 October 1524) was a Scottish peer and Chief of Clan Fraser of Lovat from c. 1500/c. 1501 until 1524. He was the only son of Hugh Fraser, 1st Lord Lovat (died c. 1500/c. 1501) and Violetta Lyon, daughter of Patrick Lyon, 1st Lord Glamis, through whom he was a great-great-great-grandson of Robert II.

Lovat married, first, Janet Gordon, the daughter of Sir Alexander Gordon of Abergeldie, with whom he had three sons (Hugh, William and James) and three daughters (Margaret, Isobel and Janet). His second marriage was to Janet Gray, the daughter of Patrick, Master of Gray, with whom he had three sons (Robert, Andrew and Thomas). Patrick became 3rd Lord Gray upon the death of his father in 1514.

Thomas was middle-aged when his father, Hugh died. His claim to fame was always about the ill-fated marriage of Margaret Tudor, the sister of Harry, daughter of King Henry VII, and his King James IV. The marriage was attended by all the great Scots Highland lords in a spirit of reconciliation and renewal. Bagpipes filled the halls of Holyrood, and a parliament also met in Edinburgh. It immediately appointed sheriffs to the Highlands to assert legal and military control. Traditional Sheriffs of Inverness, Lord Lovat frequently perambulated his estate arresting lawless marauders and punishing delinquents. A 'precept of sasine' guaranteed the king's support for Thomas' claim to his father's estates, as well as third to the barony of Aird and Abertarff, and to many other lands in the Glenelg. On 14 October 1501, the King recognised Lovat's barony of Kinnell. And a month later he came into his wife's lands at Dalcorse, Janet Gray.

Critics of Lovat's rule indicate how arbitrary judgements caused injustice. Declaratory speeches from the Moot Hill of Scoon are a mock-up of justice. Lovat claimed the precedence of Viking courts held high on a hill when he tried to regulate everything from the price of food to clothing. At the same time many of his properties burnt down in the lawless Highland countryside defying every attempt at court management. In one case he unlawfully appointed the chaplain to Inverness parish church, which under Sheriff court law was not in his gift of patronage, and alienated right to Sir Nicholas Barron. But when in 1518 his kin, James Fraser, bishop of Moray wished to presentment, and yet Lovat yielded the living to Sir John Scot.

Around the year 1505 Lovat Castle caught fire, and the charter chest was rescued by his young nephew Rory Mackenzie, the father of Murdo Mackenzie of Fairburn. Lord Lovat gave him a new bonnet and new shoes.

He was part of the council that approved John Stewart, Duke of Albany as Regent of Scotland in 1514.

Thomas Fraser, Lord Lovat died at Beaufort Castle in 1526.

== Marriages and children ==
Thomas Fraser married Janet Gordon. Their children included:

- Thomas Fraser, Master of Lovat, d. 9 Sep 1513, Flodden, Kirknewton, Northumberland, England.
- Hugh Fraser, 3rd Lord Lovat
- William Fraser
- James Fraser
- Janet Fraser, who married John Crichton of Ruthven

He married secondly, Janet Gray (d. 1510).

Peerage of Scotland
Preceded by Hugh Fraser	Lord Lovat c.1500–1524	Succeeded by Hugh Fraser
