= Hugh Fraser, 1st Lord Lovat =

Scottish peer and Chief of Clan Fraser

Lord Fraser of Lovat
- Preceded by: Title established
- Succeeded by: Thomas Fraser, 2nd Lord Lovat

Personal details
- Born: c. 1436
- Died: c. 1500/1501
- Spouse: Violetta Lyon
- Parent: Thomas Fraser of Lovat

Hugh Fraser, 1st Lord Lovat (died before 14 October 1501), was a Scottish nobleman and chief of Clan Fraser of Lovat. He was the son of Thomas Fraser of Lovat and succeeded his father as a minor before May 1455. Hugh was summoned to the Parliament of Scotland as Lord Fraser of Lovat between 1456 and 1464. He was involved in the political and military affairs of the Scottish Highlands during the reigns of James II and James III, including conflicts involving the Lord of the Isles. He was succeeded by his son, Thomas Fraser, 2nd Lord Lovat.

His numbering as Lord Lovat has been disputed by genealogical sources. James Balfour Paul and the modern Clan Fraser of Lovat organization designate him as the 1st Lord Lovat, while Bernard Burke identified him as the 3rd Lord Lovat.

== Early life ==
According to James Balfour Paul's 1908 volume 5 of The Scots Peerage, Hugh Fraser, 1st Lord Lovat was the son of Thomas Fraser of Lovat but it is not known who Thomas's wife was. Hugh succeeded his father before May 1455 and as a minor was put under the care of Archibald Douglas, Earl of Moray (died 1455). Bernard Burke, in his 1869 A Genealogical And Heraldic Dictionary of The Peerage And Baronetage of The British Empire, designates the same Hugh Fraser as the 3rd Lord Lovat and says that he was the son of Hugh Fraser, 2nd Lord Lovat and his wife who was a sister of David Wemyss "Of that Ilk", and the grandson of Hugh Fraser, 1st Lord Lovat (died 1440) and his wife Janet who was a sister of William Fenton "Of that Ilk". The family tree published by the modern Clan Fraser of Lovat organization agrees with James Balfour Paul in designating him as Hugh Fraser, 1st Lord Lovat and that he was the son of Thomas Fraser of Lovat.

== Lord Lovat ==
In 1450 his father sent him to be educated by the Earl of Moray. He was known to the Regent of Scotland who was then Duke of Albany when introduced and knighted by James II of Scotland and thence joined the Order of the Thistle.

Hugh was summoned to Parliament as Lord Fraser of Lovat sometime between 1456 and 1464. In 1464, he made an agreement with a kinsman, Alexander Fraser of Phillorth, that each would agree to support each other's surviving heir, depending on who died first. It recognised the perilous lifespan of a highlander in an age of bloody civil conflict. On 13 May 1471, the Court Auditor on behalf of Malcolm Fleming, 1st Lord Fleming ordered Hugh to pay for some land purchases granted two years previously.

Hugh opposed the chaos in the Isles that led to James II's early death. The Lord of the Isles recruited Gallowglass mercenaries to plunder his lands, seize Inverness, march to Atholl and burn the Church of St Bride. His tenants laid siege to Lovat Castle, but his clan remained loyal, easily repelling the invasion.

The MacDonalds victory at a battle at Caplach, west of Inverness returned peace to the glen of The Aird. On 31 March 1472, Hugh agreed to protect the citizens of the hill burgh of Nairn. He bought Oreland for 50 Merks off William Wallace of Craigie, and, planted some orchards.

The late medieval period was lawless and violent, and after a period of peace, he was obliged to act for the King in the wars of the Lords of the Isles and his kinfolk. Clannish feuds broke out in Sutherland and Caithness. 18 peasants were killed in a dispute that burnt Beauly Priory. Some racial disputes between Norman and Flemish descendants of the feudal clan system were complicated by James III of Scotland's minority. Two years earlier he was party to a charter ratified on 28 February 1480.

Hugh Fraser of Lovat was among the party of nobles who met the King when he crossed the Firth of Forth to Blackness, Falkirk in an effort to crush the rebellious incursions. The English defeated James, who was slain at Stirling before his loyal lords could intervene. Lovat lived to old age, but his favourite son was slain at the Battle of Flodden alongside James IV of Scotland.

== Family ==
Burke stated that he married Lady Margaret, daughter of the Earl of Glamis and was succeeded by his son, Thomas Fraser, 4th of Lovat. However, according to James Balfour Paul, Hugh Fraser, 1st Lord Lovat married Violetta, daughter of Patrick Lyon, 1st Lord Glamis (d. 1459) and they had the following children:

1. Thomas Fraser, 2nd Lord Lovat (heir and successor).
2. Margaret Fraser, married Hector de Kilmalew and had a son, Alexander.
3. Egidia Fraser, who married Ferquhard Mackintosh, 12th of Mackintosh.

The modern Clan Fraser of Lovat organization states that Hugh Fraser, 1st Lord Lovat also had a son called Hugh Fraser from who descend the cadet branches, the Frasers of Fairfield, Merkinch, Aberchalder, Foyers, Kinmonarie, and Dunchea.

According to James Balfour Paul, Hugh Fraser, 1st Lord Lovat died before 14 October 1501.

Peerage of Scotland
New creation	Lord Lovat; 1458–c.1500	Succeeded by Thomas Fraser
