= Fraser of Strichen =

The old arms of the Frasers of Strichen. The current Lord Lovat, descended from the Strichen line, uses the Lovat arms with no red border.

The Frasers of Strichen are a branch of the highland Clan Fraser of Lovat which assumed the chiefship of the clan in the 19th century.

After Archibald Campbell Fraser of Lovat, the third son of Simon Fraser, 11th Lord Lovat, died without descendants in 1815, the chiefship of Clan Fraser was passed to Thomas Alexander Fraser of Strichen. He was a descendant of the 7th Lord Lovat.

In 1854 the title of Lovat was restored, which made him the 12th Lord Lovat. This also entitled him and his descendants to a seat in the House of Lords, until the House of Lords Act 1999 ended the right of hereditary peers to sit in the House of Lords.

Simon Fraser, 16th Lord Lovat, who became chief of the Clan in 1995, is a direct descendant of Thomas Alexander Fraser of Strichen.

== Lairds of Strichen ==
- Thomas Fraser of Knockie and 1st of Strichen, died 2 October 1612, second son of Alexander Fraser, 4th Lord Lovat.
- Thomas Fraser, 2nd of Strichen.
- Thomas Fraser, 3rd of Strichen, succeeded his father in 1645.
- Thomas Fraser, 4th of Strichen, died 26 February 1685.
- Alexander Fraser, 5th of Strichen, died 3 November 1699.
- James Fraser, 6th of Strichen, died unmarried and was succeeded by his brother.
- Alexander Fraser, 7th of Strichen, died 15 February 1775.
- Alexander Fraser, 8th of Strichen, died 17 December 1794.
- Alexander Fraser, 9th of Strichen, died 28 October 1803.
- Thomas Fraser, 12th Lord Lovat and 10th of Strichen

== See also ==
- Lord Lovat
