= Simon Fraser, 13th Lord Lovat =

Scottish nobleman (1828–1887)

The Right Honourable The Lord Lovat DL
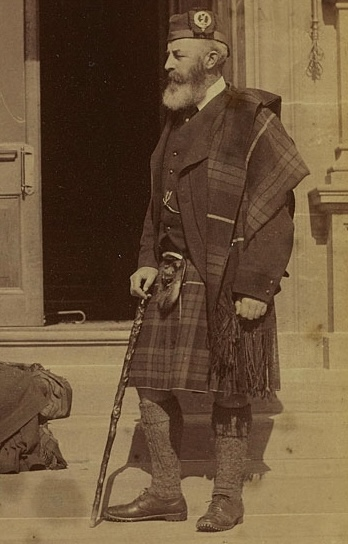
- The Lord Lovat, 1871

Lord Lieutenant of Inverness
- In office 1873–1887
- Preceded by: The Lord Lovat
- Succeeded by: Donald Cameron of Lochiel

Personal details
- Born: Simon Fraser; 21 December 1828
- Died: 6 September 1887 (aged 58) Inverness, Scotland
- Spouse: Alice Maria Weld-Blundell (m. 1866)
- Children: 9, including Simon
- Parent(s): Thomas Alexander Fraser, 12th Lord Lovat; Hon. Charlotte Georgina Jerningham
- Relatives: George Jerningham, 8th Baron Stafford (grandfather); John Scott, 4th Earl of Eldon (grandson); Gerald Maxwell (grandson); Sir David Stirling (grandson); Rose Leslie (great-great-granddaughter)

Military service
- Branch/service: Queen's Own Cameron Highlanders
- Rank: Lieutenant colonel

Simon Fraser, 13th Lord Lovat and 2nd Baron Lovat, DL (21 December 1828 – 6 September 1887) was a Scottish nobleman, landowner, and soldier. He was the 22nd Chief of Clan Fraser of Lovat in the Scottish Highlands, and responsible for overseeing the reconstruction of Beaufort Castle.

== Early life ==
Lovat was the eldest of four sons and three daughters born to Thomas Alexander Fraser, 12th Lord Lovat and Hon. Charlotte Georgina Stafford-Jerningham, daughter of George William Stafford-Jerningham, 8th Baron Stafford.

Among his siblings was Amelia Charlotte Fraser (wife of Charles Scott-Murray of Danesfield), Frances Giorgiana Fraser (wife of Sir Pyers Mostyn, 8th Baronet), Charlotte Henrietta Fraser (wife of Sir Matthew Sausse, the Chief Justice of Bombay), Alexander Edward Fraser (a Lt.-Col. in the Scots Guards who fought in the Crimean War and married Georgiana Mary Heneage, only daughter of George Fieschi Heneage of Hainton Hall) George Edward Stafford Fraser (who died unmarried), and Henry Thomas Fraser (a Colonel in the 1st Battalion Scots Guards who also died unmarried).

== Career ==
He succeeded his father in 1875, who had been awarded another barony, that of Baron Lovat, in the peerage of Great Britain. Lovat resided at Beaufort Castle, and was the 22nd Chief MacShimidh of the Clan Fraser of Lovat.

He served as a Lieutenant colonel of the 2nd Battalion Queen's Own Cameron Highlanders Militia, and Lord Lieutenant of Inverness between 1873 and 1887. From 1883 to 1887, he served as aide-de-camp to Queen Victoria.

== Marriage and issue ==
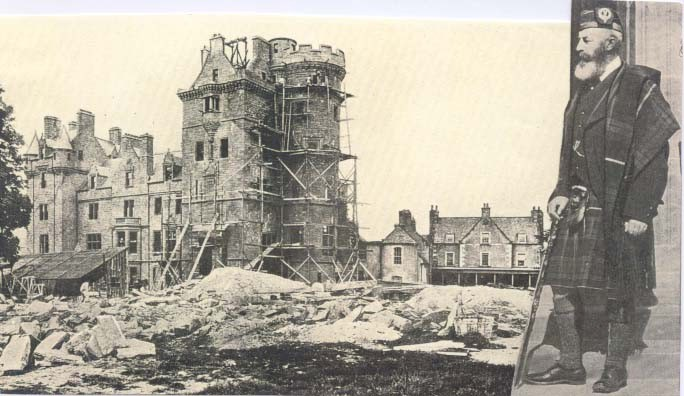
Beaufort Castle under construction in the late 1870s - the 13th Lord Lovat is shown at right.

In 1866, Fraser married Alice Maria Weld-Blundell, the fifth daughter of Thomas Weld-Blundell and his wife, Teresa Maria Eleanora Vaughan. They had 11 children:

- Simon Thomas Joseph Fraser (16 August 1867 – 28 September 1868), who died young.
- Hon. Mary Laura Fraser (2 April 1869 – 3 December 1946), who married John Scott, Viscount Encombe (1870–1900), eldest son and heir apparent of John Scott, 3rd Earl of Eldon, and had issue.
- Hon. Alice Mary Charlotte Fraser (3 March 1870 – 7 August 1958), who married Hon. Bernard Constable-Maxwell, son of William Constable-Maxwell, 10th Lord Herries of Terregles, and had issue.
- Simon Joseph Fraser, 14th Lord Lovat (1871–1933), who married Laura Lister, daughter of Lord Ribblesdale and, his first wife, Charlotte Monkton Tennant (a daughter of Sir Charles Tennant).
- Hon. Etheldreda Mary Fraser (22 November 1872 – 9 October 1949), who married diplomat Sir Francis Oswald Lindley.
- Maj. Hon. Hugh Joseph Fraser (6 July 1874 – 28 October 1914), who served with the Scots Guards and was killed in the First Battle of Ypres during World War I.
- Maj. Hon. Alastair Thomas Joseph Fraser (1 August 1877 – 14 October 1949), who married Lady Sybil Grimston, daughter of James Grimston, 3rd Earl of Verulam.
- Hon. John Fraser (born and died 25 March 1880), born prematurely in Gibraltar; survived only half an hour
- Hon. Margaret Mary Catherine Fraser OBE (25 June 1881 – 4 August 1972), who married Brig.-Gen. Archibald Stirling, son of Sir William Stirling-Maxwell, 9th Baronet, and had issue.
- Hon. Muriel Mary Rose Fraser (12 July 1884 – 26 June 1989), who became a Catholic nun.
- Hon. Ian Benedict Joseph Fraser (21 May – 16 December 1886), died in infancy

Lord Lovat died in September 1887, aged 58, while shooting on the moors of Inverness. He was succeeded by his son Simon, who became the 14th Lord Lovat. Lady Lovat survived her husband by over fifty years and died in 1938, aged 92.

== Descendants ==
Through his daughter Mary, he was a grandfather of John Scott, 4th Earl of Eldon. Through his daughter Alice, he was a grandfather of World War I flying ace Gerald Maxwell. Through his daughter Margaret, he was a grandfather of Special Air Service co-founder Sir David Stirling and army officer Bill Stirling. Through his daughter Ethelreda, he was a great-grandfather of Christian Mary McEwen, Rory McEwen, Henry Keswick, Chips Keswick, and Simon Keswick, and a great-great-grandfather of Joseph Yorke, 10th Earl of Hardwicke and Louis Waymouth.

Honorary titles
Preceded by The Lord Lovat	Lord Lieutenant of Inverness; 1873–1887	Succeeded by Donald Cameron
Preceded by Thomas Alexander Fraser	MacShimidh; 1875–1887	Succeeded by Simon Fraser
Peerage of Scotland
Preceded by Thomas Alexander Fraser	Lord Lovat; 1875–1887	Succeeded by Simon Fraser
Peerage of the United Kingdom
Preceded by Thomas Alexander Fraser	Baron Lovat; 1875–1887	Succeeded by Simon Fraser
