= Thomas Fraser, 12th Lord Lovat =

Scottish peer

The Right Honourable The Lord Lovat KT

Lord Lieutenant of Inverness
- In office 1853–1873
- Preceded by: The Earl of Seafield
- Succeeded by: The Lord Lovat

Personal details
- Born: Thomas Alexander Fraser; 17 June 1802 Strichen, Aberdeenshire, Scotland
- Died: 28 June 1875 (aged 73)
- Spouse: Hon. Charlotte Georgina Jerningham (m. 1823)
- Children: 7, including Simon
- Parent(s): Alexander Fraser, 9th of Strichen; Amelia Leslie
- Relatives: Simon Fraser, 14th Lord Lovat (grandson)

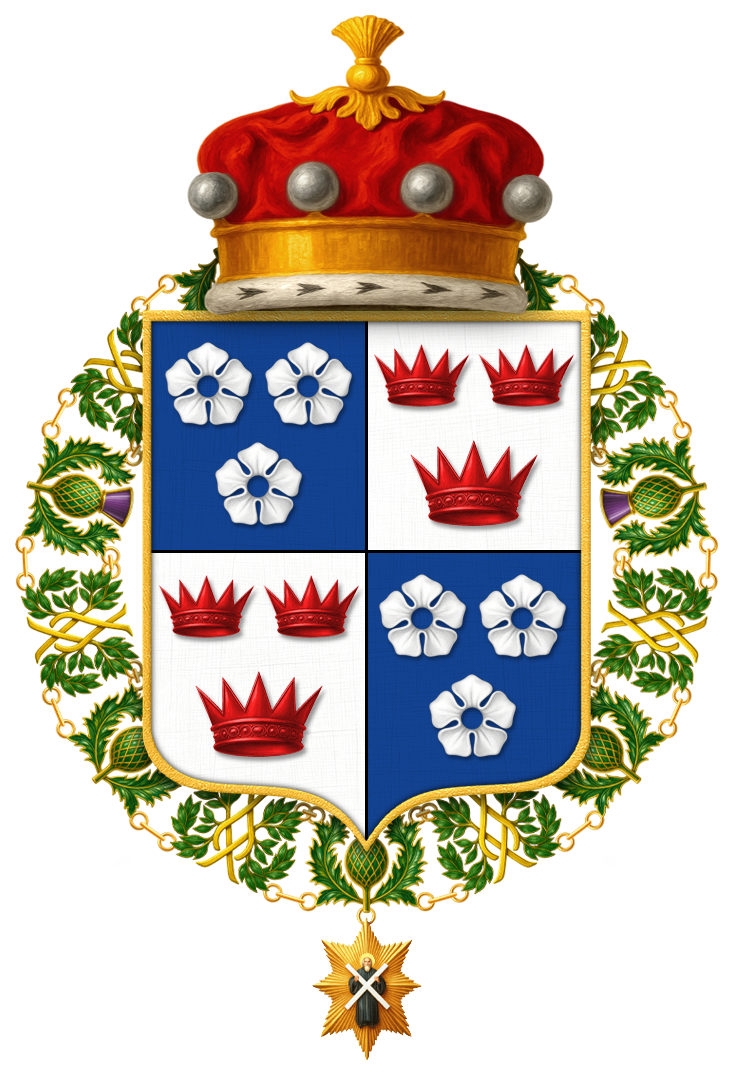
Shield of Arms of Thomas Alexander Fraser, 12th Lord Lovat and 1st Baron Lovat, KT

Thomas Alexander Fraser, 12th Lord Lovat and 1st Baron Lovat, KT (17 June 1802 – 28 June 1875) was a Scottish nobleman. He was the 21st Chief MacShimidh of Clan Fraser of Lovat, succeeding to the title of his distant cousin, the 11th Lord Lovat, who had been attainted and executed as a Jacobite in 1747.

== Early life ==
Born on 17 June 1802, he was the son of Amelia (née Leslie) Fraser and Alexander Fraser, 9th of Strichen, a Captain of the 1st Dragoon Guards who died on 28 October 1803, shortly after his birth. His paternal grandparents were Alexander Fraser, 8th of Strichen and Jean (née Menzies) Fraser (a daughter of William Menzies and niece of James Menzies of Culdares). His maternal grandparents were John Leslie, 22nd Baron of Balquhain and the former Violet Dalzell.

In 1821, Fraser commissioned Aberdeen architect John Smith to design a town house known as Strichen Town House.

== Career ==
In 1815, upon the death of Archibald Campbell Fraser (who outlived all of his children), Fraser became the 21st Chief of the Clan Fraser, through his descent from the second son of the 4th Lord Lovat. He also inherited the Lovat estates at Beauly in Inverness-shire. On 28 January 1837 he was created Baron Lovat, of Lovat in the County of Inverness, in the Peerage of the United Kingdom. In 1854, the attainder of the 11th Lord Lovat (who had been attainted and executed in 1747) was reversed, and Lovat thereby became 12th Lord Lovat in the Peerage of Scotland. He notably served as Lord Lieutenant of Inverness from 1853 to 1873 and was made a Knight of the Thistle in 1865.

== Personal life ==
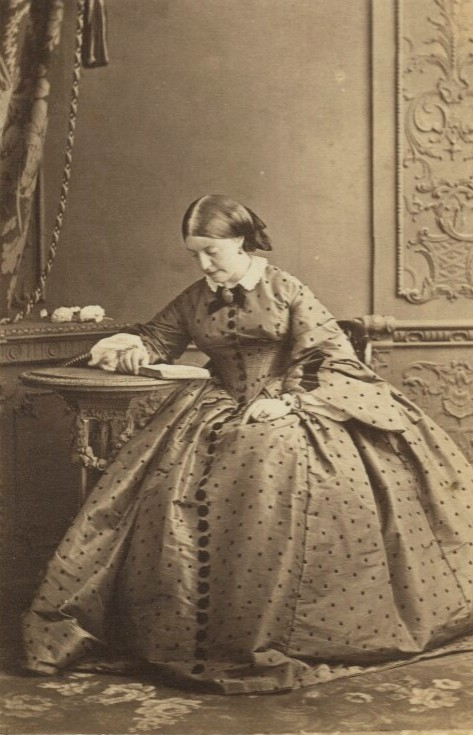
Photograph of his daughter Amelia, 1863.

On 6 August 1823, Fraser was married to Charlotte Georgina Stafford-Jerningham (1800–1876), the daughter of George William Stafford-Jerningham, 8th Baron Stafford, in 1823. The couple had three daughters and four sons:

- Hon. Amelia Charlotte Fraser (22 August 1824 – 1912), who married Charles Scott-Murray of Danesfield, a Conservative MP for Buckinghamshire.
- Hon. Frances Georgina Fraser (20 February 1826 – 25 December 1899), who married Sir Pyers Mostyn, 8th Baronet (1811–1882).
- Hon. Charlotte Henrietta Fraser (6 June 1827 – 21 July 1904), who married Sir Matthew Sausse, the Chief Justice of Bombay, in 1866.
- Simon Fraser, 13th Lord Lovat (1828–1887), who married Alice Mary Weld-Blundell, daughter of Thomas Weld-Blundell.
- Hon. Alexander Edward Fraser (13 January 1831 – 20 September 1885), a Lt.-Col. in the Scots Guards who fought in the Crimean War and married Georgiana Mary Heneage, only daughter of George Fieschi Heneage of Hainton Hall.
- Hon. George Edward Stafford Fraser (17 February 1834 – 4 May 1854), who died unmarried.
- Hon. Henry Thomas Fraser (2 December 1838 – 3 August 1904), a Colonel in the 1st Battalion Scots Guards who died unmarried.

Lord Lovat died in June 1875, aged 73, and was succeeded in his titles by his eldest son Simon. Lady Lovat died in 1876.

=== Legacy ===
Lord Lovat's legacy is that of the present 16th Lord Lovat, and the good standing of the present Clan Fraser. He completed the restoration of Lovat titles and lands, which had been started by the 11th Lord's son, General Simon Fraser of Lovat.

== Red squirrels ==
In the 1880s, Lord Lovat's wife, Lady Charlotte, pioneered the translocation and release of English red squirrels to augment depleted populations of the species in the Highlands.

Honorary titles
Preceded by The Earl of Seafield	Lord Lieutenant of Inverness; 1853–1873	Succeeded by Simon Fraser
Preceded by Archibald Campbell Fraser	MacShimidh; 1815–1875	Succeeded by Simon Fraser
Peerage of Scotland
Preceded by Simon Fraser	Lord Lovat; 1854–1875 (attainder reversed)	Succeeded by Simon Fraser
Peerage of the United Kingdom
New creation	Baron Lovat; 1837–1875	Succeeded by Simon Fraser
