= John Elder (writer) =

Scottish cartographer and writer

John Elder (fl. 1542 – 1565) was a Scottish cartographer and writer. He was the tutor of Henry Stuart, Lord Darnley in England.

== Life ==
Elder was a native of Caithness. He passed twelve years of his life at the universities of St. Andrews, Aberdeen, and Glasgow, and appears to have entered the ministry. He went to England soon after the death of King James V in 1542, and received an annual pension.

At the accession of Mary I of England, Elder turned Roman Catholic, as is apparent from a letter addressed to Robert Stewart, bishop-elect of Caithness. He sent with it verses and adages written with the hand of Henry Stuart, Lord Darnley, the bishop's nephew, Elder then being with Darnley, who was not yet nine years of age, at Temple Newsam, Yorkshire. He refers to Darnley's noble parents as his patrons.

This John Elder seems to be the Scot described by Nicholas Throckmorton at the coronation of Francis II of France, (or possibly the man was Arthur Lallart). Throckmorton wrote on 19 September 1559 that Elder had described the policy of Edmund Bonner Bishop of London and Cardinal Pole in the time of Mary I of England to Charles, Cardinal of Lorraine. He added that Elder was "as great a praticer, and as dangerous for the matters of England, as any that I know." Throckmorton advised Elizabeth I to have Elder's English acquaintance watched.

In 1561, Elder told one of the servants of the Earl of Lennox that he had shown Darnley's juvenile handwriting to Mary, Queen of Scots when she was in France. The servant, possibly Thomas Bishop, was distrustful of him and thought he had the wit to be a spy, "he haitht wytt to playe the aspye where he listitht". Elder joined Lord Darnley and his wife Mary, Queen of Scots in August 1565, travelling from Flanders, according to a letter of the Earl of Bedford

== Works ==
He presented to Henry VIII, or Edward VI a 'plot' or map of the realm of Scotland, being a description of all the chief towns, castles, and abbeys in each county and shire, with the situation of the principal isles. In an accompanying letter to Henry, Elder is very severe on David Beaton, denouncing him as the pestiferous cardinal, and his bishops as blind and ignorant; in the subscription he styles himself clerk and a 'redshank,' meaning by the latter designation, it is supposed, 'a roughfooted Scot or highlander.' Presumably for this writing, "John Elder, Redshank Scott" was given a reward of £5 on 12 August 1547.

Another surviving letter by Elder is addressed to Mr. Secretary Paget, dated from Newcastle upon Tyne, 6 October 1545. This gives an account of the operations of the army under the command of the Earl of Hertford in the invasion of Scotland between 8 and 23 September 1545, minutely detailing their daily proceedings, with a list of the towns, villages and steadings burnt each day. He mentions that the Governor of Scotland, Regent Arran, was sick with 'colic & stone', physicians checked his water, and he could not ride.

As a New Years gift to Lord Robert Stewart, Bishop of Caithness, Elder wrote a description of the wedding of Mary I of England and Philip of Spain. This was printed in 1555 as, The copie of a letter sent in to Scotlande of the arivall and landynge, and most noble marryage of ... Philippe, prynce of Spaine to the ... Princes Marye quene of England solemnisated in the citie of Winchester.
