= Lovat Castle =

Coordinates: 57.4808°N 4.4400°W

- Interactive map of the Lovat Castle area

General information
- Location: Highlands, Kirkhill and Beauly, Scotland
- Completed: 11th or 12th century
- Demolished: 1671

Lovat Castle was a castle in the Highlands of Scotland, near Kirkhill and Beauly. The castle stood on the south bank of the River Beauly. Originally known as Beauly Castle, it was built by the Bissets in the 11th-12th century. The castle came into the Frasers' hands with the marriage of Simon Fraser to a Bissett heiress in the 13th century.

Nothing remains of the castle. It is now the site of farm buildings at Wester Lovat. The castle was dismantled for building materials in 1671. The stone and oak beams were ferried over the River Beauly to a new site.

== History ==
There was a fire at Lovat around 1505. Rory Mackenzie, a nephew of Thomas Fraser, 2nd Lord Lovat, and later the father of Murdo Mackenzie of Fairburn, was staying and he rescued the Fraser charter chest from the flames. Thomas, Lord Lovat enlarged the orchard, and planted elms, planes, and ash trees. He had a new well dug in the central courtyard.

Hugh Fraser, 3rd Lord Lovat was said to have fortified the courtyard of Lovat during the reign of James V with yetts and installed a great oaken entrance gate. He built a dyke planted with aspen trees around the green, and repaired the castle chapel which was dedicated to St Laurence.

In the autumn of 1634 a man cutting withies in the orchard of Lovat Castle found an earthenware pot filled with gold coins and rings. It was thought the treasure was brought to Lovat by Elizabeth Stewart, the bride of Hugh Fraser, 5th Lord Lovat, and had been stolen and hidden by her maid.
