= Simon Fraser, 1st Laird of Lovat =

Simon Fraser, 1st Laird of Lovat (died 1333) was the ancestor and first chief of the Clan Fraser of Lovat which is a Scottish clan of the Scottish Highlands. He was killed in 1333 at the Battle of Halidon Hill during the Second War of Scottish Independence.

== Early life ==
He was the second son of Sir Andrew Fraser who died in 1308 and his elder brother was Alexander Fraser of Touchfraser and Cowie who was the ancestor of the Clan Fraser in the Scottish Lowlands. Their father, Sir Andrew Fraser, was the cousin of Simon Fraser (died 1306) who was known as the Patriot and who had been hanged, drawn, and quartered by the English. (Note: The historians Anderson (1825) and Mackenzie (1896) both state that Simon Fraser, 1st Laird of Lovat was the elder brother of Alexander Fraser of Touchfraser and Cowie. However, modern historians have confirmed that Alexander Fraser was actually the elder brother of Simon Fraser.)

His father had estates in Caithness but Simon was the first of the family to hold estates in the county of Inverness where he came to hold the estate of Lovat.

== Wars of Scottish Independence ==
Simon Fraser first appears on record in 1308 when he joined Robert the Bruce (Robert I of Scotland) at the Battle of Inverurie where they defeated John Comyn, Earl of Buchan. A charter has survived from Robert I of Scotland to "Sir Alexander Fraser, knight and his brother, Simon Fraser". Simon Fraser also supported Robert the Bruce in his victory over the English at the Battle of Bannockburn in 1314 and fought in support of Domhnall II, Earl of Mar against Edward Balliol at the Battle of Annan, and Battle of Dupplin Moor in 1332 where his brother, Alexander Fraser, was killed. Simon Fraser was killed at the Battle of Halidon Hill fighting against the English in 1333.

== Family ==
Simon Fraser had married Margaret, daughter of John, Earl of Orkney and Caithness. Upon the death of Magnus, Earl of Orkney and Caithness, Simon Fraser unsuccessfully claimed the earldom through his wife in contest with Malise V, Earl of Strathearn. However, Simon Fraser successfully acquired the property of Lovat through his wife's mother who was the daughter of Graham of Lovat. Simon Fraser and his wife Margaret had the following children:

1. Simon Fraser, 2nd Laird of Lovat.
2. Alexander Fraser, 3rd Laird of Lovat.
3. James Fraser, who was knighted by Robert III of Scotland and who was killed in the Anglo-Scottish Wars.
4. Janet Fraser, of whom nothing is known.

== See also ==
- Lord Lovat
