= Hugh Fraser, 3rd Lord Lovat =

Scottish peer

- Born: c. 1494
- Died: 15 July 1544 (aged 50); Kinlochlochy, Scotland
- Cause of death: killed in battle
- Title: Lord (Fraser) of Lovat
- Predecessor: Thomas Fraser, 2nd Lord Lovat
- Successor: Alexander Fraser, 4th Lord Lovat
- Spouse(s): Anna Grant (d. c. 1536); Janet Ross (d. 1565)
- Parent(s): Thomas Fraser, 2nd Lord Lovat; Janet Gordon

Hugh Fraser, 3rd Lord Lovat (c. 1494 – 15 July 1544) was a Scottish peer and Chief of Clan Fraser of Lovat from 1524 until 1544.

== Biography ==
Fraser was the eldest son of Thomas Fraser, 2nd Lord Lovat (died 1524) and Janet Gordon, daughter of Sir Alexander Gordon of Abergeldie. He enlarged the family's portfolio of lands, purchasing a number of estates and receiving several more as royal grants, including a feu-charter of the lands of Beaufort.

Lovat became involved, with tragic consequences, in the succession dispute within Clanranald triggered by the death of the 7th chief, Alexander Macdonald, in c.1530. With the support of Ewen Cameron of Lochiel (d. 1547), chief of Clan Cameron, whose clan was on the rise in Lochaber owing to a period of strong crown pressure on Clan Donald, Alexander's son John Moidartach was installed as the 8th chief of the clan. However, Cameron's meddling in the affair was resented by the most powerful peer in northern Scotland, George Gordon, 4th Earl of Huntly, a nephew of James V.

In 1540, John was arrested and imprisoned by the king, and his uncle, Ranald Gallda, promptly asserted his own claim to the chiefship of Clanranald with Lovat's backing, declaring John's birth to be illegitimate. After John's release from prison and return to Lochaber, Ranald was unable to cling to power and fled to Lovat, who gave him refuge. Cameron having joined the Macdonalds on a punitive raid of Lovat's lands in Stratherrick and Abertarff, Huntly marched to Lovat's aid and joined the Frasers on a retaliatory raid of Moidart. Returning east from this raid by a different route from Huntly, Lovat was pursued by a force of Macdonalds and Camerons, who overtook the Frasers at the head of Loch Lochy on 15 July 1544.

Battle was joined, and the result was an unqualified disaster for Clan Fraser of Lovat: Lovat himself was killed, along with his brother James, his eldest son Simon, and some three hundred men of his clan. Although Ranald Gallda too was slain in the battle of Loch Lochy, leaving John Moidartach secure in the chiefship, an enraged Huntly swiftly returned to Lochaber in force and arrested Cameron, who was put to death at Elgin in 1547.

== Marriage and family ==
Hugh Fraser had two brothers, William Fraser of Teachers and James Fraser of Culbokie, and three sisters Margaret, Isobel and Janet, the last of whom married John Crichton of Ruthven, as well as three half-brothers, Robert Fraser, Andrew Fraser and Thomas Fraser.

He married, first, Anna Grant (d. c.1536), the daughter of John Grant of Freuchie, their son Hugh Fraser, Master of Lovat was killed at Loch Lochy in 1544.

Hugh Fraser married secondly, Janet Ross (d. 1565), daughter of Walter Ross of Balnagown. Their children included:

- Alexander Fraser, 4th Lord Lovat
- Simon Fraser
- William Fraser of Struy
- Hugh Fraser
- Agnes Fraser, who married Walter MacLeod of Dunvegan, their daughter was Mary MacLeod
- Margaret Fraser

Peerage of Scotland
Preceded by Thomas Fraser	Lord Lovat; 1524–1544	Succeeded by Alexander Fraser
