= Battle of the Shirts =

1544 Scottish clan battle in the Great Glen

Coordinates: 57°1′49″N 4°49′8″W

Battle of the Shirts (Blàr na Léine, Kinloch-Lochy)
- Part of the Scottish clan wars
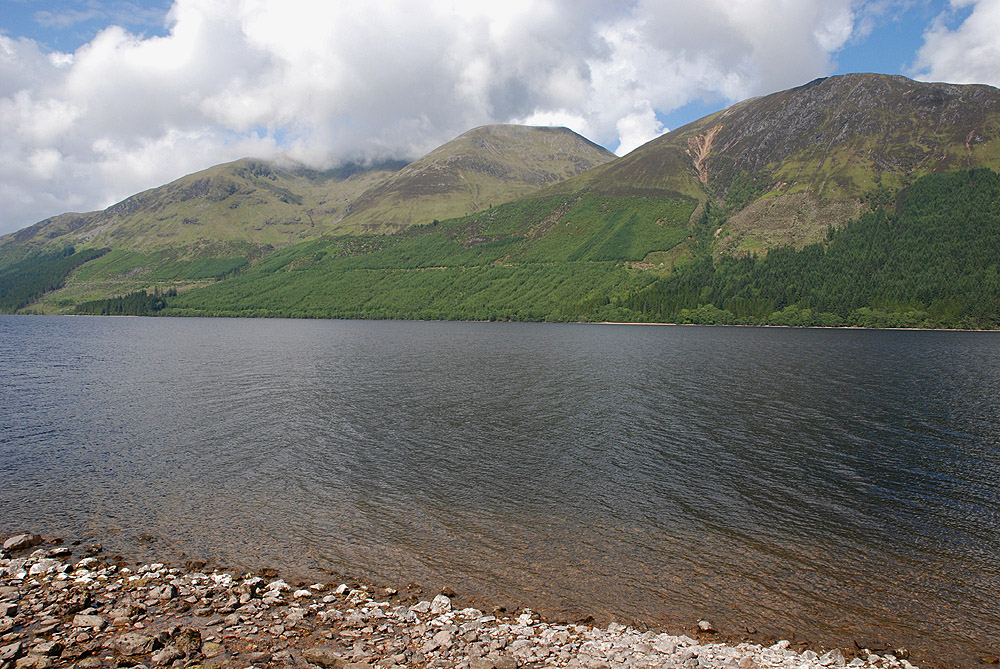
- Loch Lochy
Date	July 1544
Location	Laggan, north end of Loch Lochy (Laggen and Kinloch Lochy) grid reference NN289967
Result	Clan Donald victory

Belligerents
Clan Fraser of Lovat; Assisted by Clan Grant and Clan Mackintosh	Clan Macdonald of Clanranald; Assisted by Clan Cameron

Commanders and leaders
Hugh Fraser, 3rd Lord Lovat †	John of Moidart (Iain Muideartach)

Strength
300	500

Casualties and losses
5 survivors (295 killed)	8 survivors (492 killed)

Registered battlefield
- Official name: Blar na Léine
- Designated: 14 December 2012
- Reference no.: BTL29

The Battle of the Shirts (Scottish Gaelic: Blàr na Léine, also the Battle of Kinloch-Lochy) was a Scottish clan battle that took place in 1544 in the Great Glen, at the northern end of Loch Lochy. The Clan Macdonald of Clanranald and their allies the Clan Cameron fought the Clan Fraser and men from Clan Grant. The battlefield has been included and protected by Historic Scotland in their Inventory of Historic Battlefields in Scotland.

Clan tradition of the clans involved and all histories written since the period have stated that the name was derived from the fact that the day was so hot that both sides threw off their chainmail hauberks and Plaids, fighting in their shirts.

== Background ==
The chiefship of the Clan Macdonald of Clanranald was in dispute. Hugh Fraser, 3rd Lord Lovat, chief of Clan Fraser of Lovat, was the uncle of one of the warring claimants, Ranald Galda (the stranger), whose cause he supported. Lovat with over four hundred of his best men joined up with the Earl of Huntly, chief of Clan Gordon, who was the Lieutenant of the North. They intended to crush the MacDonalds and make Ranald the chief. The combined Fraser and Gordon force marched to Inverlochy, in Lochaber and they successfully established Ranald's control over Moidart by taking Castle Tioram.

== Battle ==
The Earl of Huntly decided to split his forces from the Frasers and returned to his own territory. The expedition being cut short, Fraser, Lord Lovat led his men up the Great Glen towards Glenmoriston. This decision to divide their forces for their return journey might indicate that Lovat and Huntly thought that the MacDonalds were no longer a threat.

The MacDonalds had been stalking the invaders but had held back because they were numerically inferior. However, with Huntly's men gone, the MacDonalds moved swiftly to outflank Lovat, falling upon the unsuspecting Frasers on an area of wild marshland to the north of Loch Lochy. The battle became known as Blar-ne-leine which means the field of the shirts because the heat of the day caused the Highlanders to take off their heavy chainmail coats and fight in their shirts. That translation is however disputed by some non-Gaelic commentators, who assert that it really refers to the marshy ground.

Lovat and his Frasers were outnumbered, but he could have fought a rearguard action to cover his escape. Instead, Lovat led his men into a pitched battle. Lovat was killed along with his son and heir, and hundreds of men. The battle ended in a stalemate with only 5 Frasers and 8 MacDonalds surviving the day.

== Aftermath ==
Lovat and his son were later buried at Beauly Priory. For the most part the Earl of Huntly focused his attention in other parts of Scotland thereafter, as a result of which John MacDonald, Cameron of Lochiel, and the chiefs of Glengarry, Keppoch, and Glencoe were free to spend the month of April 1545 sacking the regions near Urquhart Castle, destroying what they did not take. Parliament attempted to summon John to answer accusations of treason several times beginning in September, but John did not respond. No records suggest that Parliament ever successfully called to account the Captain of Clanranald, who finally died unrepentant in 1584.

== Bibliography ==
- The Book of Clanranald, in Reliquae Celticae, vol. II ed. A. MacBain and J. Kennedy, 1894.
- Fraser, James, The Chronicles of the Frasers. The Wardlaw Manuscript, ed. W. Mackay, 1905.
- Grant, N., Scottish Clans and Tartans.Crescent Books, New York, 1987 ISBN 0-517-49901-0.
- Gregory, D., History of the Western Highlands and Islands of Scotland, 1975 reprint.
- Hill, J. M., The Distinctiveness of Gaelic Warfare, 1400–1750, in The European History Quarterly, vol. 22, 1992.T
- Lesley, Bishop John, The History of Scotland from the Death of King James I, 1830.
- MacDonald C., Moidart, or among the Clanranalds, 1889.
- Mackay, D. N., Clan warfare in the Scottish Highlands, 1922.
- Alexander MacGregor, 'The Feuds of the Clans.
