= Elizabeth Stewart, Countess of Arran =

Scottish aristocrat and political intriguer

Elizabeth Stewart, Countess of Arran (c. 1554–1590) was a Scottish noblewoman and political intriguer. Several accounts of her actions and ambition were written by her political enemies.

== Family background ==
Elizabeth Stewart was the daughter of John Stewart, 4th Earl of Atholl (d. 1579) and Elizabeth Gordon, a daughter of George Gordon, 4th Earl of Huntly.

== Marriages and divorce ==
She married Hugh Fraser, 5th Lord Lovat (d. 1577) in 1564. She was said to have brought gold coins and jewellery with her to Lovat Castle. These treasures were stolen by her maid Kennedy, who was caught and drowned in a pool at the castle. In 1634 a hoard was discovered in the castle orchard, supposed to be the treasure buried by Elizabeth Stewart's maid.

She married secondly, in 1579, Robert Stewart, Earl of March. She was known for a time as "Dame Elizabeth Stewart, Countess of Lennox", her husband's other title. In August 1579, she was given £700 Scots as a gift from the royal exchequer.

She divorced Robert Stewart on 19 May 1581 to marry thirdly James Stewart, Earl of Arran, then known as Captain James Stewart. The divorce was considered scandalous. An early historian David Calderwood wrote:

Captain James Stewart, after that he was made tutor to the Earl of Arran, he grew so familiar with the Countess of March that he begot upon her a child. To cover this adulterous fact, a process of divorcement was intended by her against her lawful husband, the Earl of March, which was easily obtained, and so, the made earl and she were joined together in marriage. She was delivered of a man child about this time.

== Arran supremacy ==
Arran's power over the young king James VI of Scotland, which he shared with Esmé Stewart, 1st Duke of Lennox, made him and his wife unpopular in Scotland.

James VI gave Esmé Stewart gifts of jewels that remained from the collection of Mary, Queen of Scots, including in October 1581 a gold cross with diamonds and rubies, the "Great Harry" or "Great H of Scotland", and other pieces. The gift was witnessed by Countess of Arran, the Master of Ogilvy and officials of the wardrobe. After Esmé Stewart's death, some of the same jewels were obtained by the countess, and by another favourite Colonel William Stewart.

In February 1583 she was in Edinburgh, to beg for her husband's liberty from the Ruthven Raiders. She approached the English diplomat Robert Bowes declaring her husband's commitment to amity with England, but Bowes described this initiative to Francis Walsingham as a "slender motion" of no value unless it came from the Earl. She wrote to Janet Scott, Lady Ferniehirst in October 1583 asking her to solicit the support of Mary Queen of Scots and the Hamiltons for her and her husband.

Elizabeth Stewart and Arran resided at Holyrood Palace, where their lodgings included the "Balling House", a hall for dancing. Robert Bowes wrote that she had great rule in court in March 1584 and greater rule in the court of session, and was able to secure the acquittal of the Laird of Cessford and James Home of Coldenknowes, who had been threatened with imprisonment. In August William Davison heard that she and Arran had made a list of 60 people to forfeit in parliament, so that she might collect the dowries of several noble ladies, and that she had sat in the meetings of the Privy Council. Davison reported that the Countess of Arran had new keys made for the coffers containing the jewels and clothes of Mary, Queen of Scots. She was said to have tried on many of the queen's garments to see if they fitted her, and chosen what she liked.

The Earl and Countess of Arran invited the English diplomat William Davison and a French envoy Albert Fontenay, sent by Mary, Queen of Scots, to a banquet at Edinburgh Castle. When the Countess of Arran asked Fontenay if he would attend, Fontenay claimed that the Scottish fare on the menu disagreed with him and he would get colic. This answer made King James blush and smile. Fontenay was promoting a scheme for Mary to return to Scotland and rule jointly with James VI, called the "association". The plan would end the power enjoyed by Arran and his wife. Fontenay wrote that the Earl and Countess took every opportunity to convince James that Mary would displace him rather than form a partnership. He thought the couple were concerned that if Mary were freed, she might marry and have another heir. Before he left Edinburgh, Fontenay was disappointed that the Earl and Countess of Arran frustrated Mary's plans and he wrote that the Countess had bewitched the king, on croit que sa femme l'a ensorcele.

In September 1584 the king gave Arran and the Countess property incomes taken from Dorothy Stewart, Countess of Gowrie. In November 1584 Henry I, Duke of Guise wrote thanking her for the reception she had given to his envoy Seigneur Paul in Scotland, and gifts she had sent on Paul's return, hoping she will continue her good services for the king and queen of Scotland. Paul, who brought horses for the young king, was unpopular in Protestant Scotland and said to have had a role in the St. Bartholomew's Day massacre in 1572.

It was said that Elizabeth Stewart was made "lady comptroller", and held courts and had people hanged who could not pay their compositions or fines, saying "What had they been doing all their days that had not so much as five pounds to buy them from the gallows?" In 1584 she extracted £3000 from the Laird of Haggs and restored the living of Robert Crichton, Bishop of Dunkeld a professed Catholic, held by the Earl of Argyll. Someone wrote to Mary, Queen of Scots, of the rumour that James VI was governed by Arran's lies and "bewitched by the diabelerie of his wicked and audacious wife".

Arran had obtained a quantity of jewels royal belonging to James VI, or to his mother, Mary, Queen of Scots. On 28 May 1585 Elizabeth Stewart passed sets of pearl, ruby, and diamond buttons or settings from the garnishings for a French hood to the Master of Gray, who was master of the king's wardrobe. The precious stones were sewn on the king's cloak. In June 1585 she sent a message to Edward Wotton an English ambassador who had met the king, that he ought to speak to Arran first. Wotton told the Master of Gray, who told the king, and he criticised Arran for sending such messages to an ambassador.

An English border warden John Selby reported that on 23 June 1585 that she had built a barrier in front of Edinburgh Castle but the townspeople had promptly demolished it. She and her husband were then sent to Dirleton Castle. Selby sent a retraction to Francis Walsingham, saying this news was doubtful, but he had several reports that the fall of Arran was imminent. She had closed up a way to the Castle Bank, and the town sent Henry Nisbet and others to ask her to re-open the path.

In September 1585 the countess and her husband received a royal grant of properties in Ayr and Ayrshire, including the baronies of Colvill, Barnweill, and Symontoun, some of which had belonged to William Cunningham of Caprinton. Francis Walsingham heard that she "guided" her husband and sought their reconciliation with Mary, Queen of Scots.

After Arran fell from power in 1585, she was again called "Lady Lovat". In November Stewart made his way from house arrest at Kinneil House, with jewels that his wife obtained from Edinburgh Castle, trying to get a ship at Ayr (where he had a house). The English ambassador William Knollys said she was imprisoned at this time for giving him these jewels. They returned the royal jewels, including the "Great H of Scotland", by January 1586.

In April 1586 she was staying in various houses near Edinburgh and in Leith

John Wallace of Craigie complained about "James Stewart, late Chancellor, and Dame Elizabeth Stewart, Countess of Lovat" to the Privy Council in October 1587. They had occupied his Castle of Sanquhar and had obtained from James VI letters exempting them from "horning", a legal process where debtors lost their credit. The Council declared the letters null and void.

The date of her death is uncertain. A letter of April 1590 gave a report of her death. Thomas Kennedy of Culzean heard that she had died in childbirth in April 1590.

== Family ==
The children of Elizabeth Stewart and Hugh Fraser, 5th Lord Lovat included:

- Simon Fraser (1570–1633), who married Jean Stewart (d. 1622), daughter of James Stewart, 1st Lord Doune, a lady in waiting to Anne of Denmark in 1596.
- Margaret Fraser, who married James Cumming of Altyre. They were 5th great-grandparents of United States President James Monroe.
- Anne Fraser, who married Hector Munro of Foulis.

Her son with Arran, James Stewart, was born in Edinburgh Castle, and baptised 14 March 1583 with the king and the Duke of Lennox as godparents. He bought the title Lord Ochiltree from Andrew Stewart, Lord Ochiltree.
