= Battle of Annan =

Battle on 16 December 1332 at Annan, Dumfries and Galloway in Scotland

Coordinates: 54.990°N 3.242°W

- Part of the Wars of Scottish Independence
Date	16 December 1332
Location	Annan, Dumfriesshire
Result	Bruce loyalist victory

Belligerents
Bruce supporters	Balliol supporters

Commanders and leaders
Archibald Douglas; John Randolph; Robert Stewart; Simon Fraser	Edward Balliol

The Battle of Annan, also referred to in contemporary sources as the Camisade of Annan, took place on 16 December 1332 in the town of Annan, Dumfries and Galloway, Scotland.

Edward Balliol had seized the Scottish crown three months earlier following his victory at the Battle of Dupplin Moor (10–11 August 1332). In October of that year, Sir Archibald Douglas, Guardian of Scotland, negotiated a truce with Balliol, ostensibly to allow the Scottish Parliament to convene and determine the rightful monarch. Believing the truce secure, Balliol dismissed most of his English forces and relocated to Annan, on the northern shore of the Solway Firth.

While at Annan, Balliol issued public letters proclaiming that, with England's support, he had regained the Scottish throne. In these declarations, he acknowledged Scotland as a fief of the English crown, pledged fealty to Edward III of England, and promised him territorial concessions, including Berwick-upon-Tweed.

In the early hours of 16 December 1332, a force of Bruce loyalists launched a surprise attack on Balliol’s position. The assault was led by Sir Archibald Douglas, John Randolph, 3rd Earl of Moray, Robert Stewart, and Simon Fraser, 1st Laird of Lovat. Most of Balliol’s men were killed in the attack. Balliol himself narrowly escaped by fleeing, reportedly through a hole in the wall, and rode allegedly in his nightclothes or naked across the border to Carlisle, England. The rout at Annan effectively brought an end to Balliol’s first attempt to claim the Scottish throne during the Second War of Scottish Independence.

Balliol’s younger brother and designated heir, Henry Balliol, later died from wounds sustained in the battle. His death marked the end of the Balliol line in Scotland, as Edward Balliol died childless in 1364.

At the time of the battle, Robert Stewart, the future King Robert II of Scotland, was approximately sixteen years old. The Bruce loyalists were acting in support of David II of Scotland, the eight-year-old son of Robert the Bruce, who had died on 7 June 1329. Douglas had previously sent the young king to Dumbarton Castle for protection.
