= Lord Lovat =

Scottish nobility title

- Quarterly, 1st & 4th: Azure three fraises Argent; 2nd & 3rd: Argent three antique crowns Gules.
- Creation date: 1458
- Created by: James III
- Peerage: Peerage of Scotland
- First holder: Hugh Fraser, 1st Lord Lovat
- Present holder: Simon Fraser, 16th Lord Lovat
- Heir presumptive: Hon. Jack Fraser, Master of Lovat
- Subsidiary titles: Baron Lovat
- Seats: Beaufort Lodge; Balblair House
- Former seat: Beaufort Castle
- Motto: Je suis prest (I am ready)

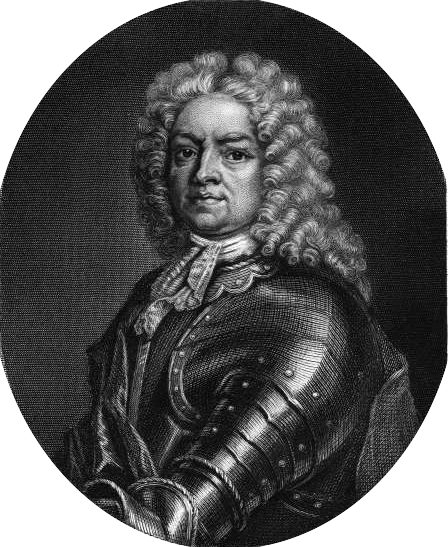
Simon Fraser, 11th Lord Lovat.

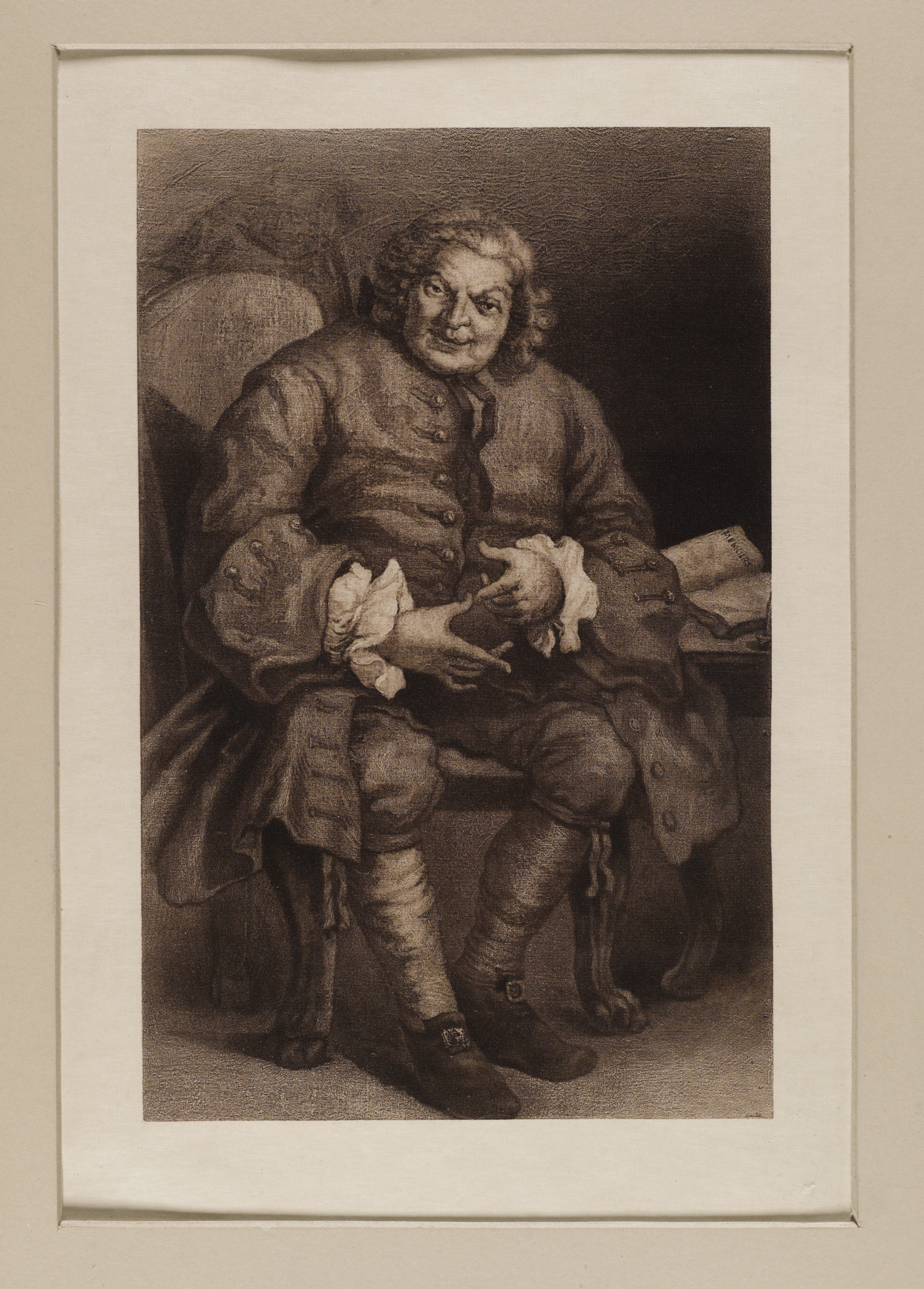
Simon Fraser, 11th Lord Lovat. Engraving c. 1715

Lord Lovat (Scottish Gaelic: Mac Shimidh) is a title of the rank Lord of Parliament in the Peerage of Scotland. It was created in 1458 for Hugh Fraser by summoning him to the Scottish Parliament as Lord Fraser of Lovat, although the holder is referred to simply as Lord Lovat. It was a separate title from the Scottish feudal lordship of Lovat, already held by the highland Frasers. In 1837 they were created a third title, Baron Lovat, of Lovat in the County of Inverness, in the Peerage of the United Kingdom. The holder is separately and independently the Chief of the highland Clan Fraser of Lovat.

The first Lord Lovat was one of the hostages for James I of Scotland on his return to Scotland in 1424, and in 1431 he was appointed high sheriff of the county of Inverness. The second Lord Lovat, Thomas, held the office of Justiciary of the North in the reign of James IV of Scotland, and died 21 October 1524.

The title descended in a direct line for nine sequential generations from 1458 until the death of the ninth Lord in 1696. He was succeeded by his great-uncle, the tenth Lord. In 1697 the latter's son, Simon Fraser, 11th Lord Lovat, known as Simon "the Fox", kidnapped and forcibly married the late ninth Lord's widow, the former Lady Amelia Murray, only daughter of John Murray, 1st Marquess of Atholl. Lady Lovat's powerful family, the Murrays, were angered, and prosecuted Fraser, who fled the country. Fraser was convicted in absentia, attainted, and sentenced to death. Fraser supported the Government against the Jacobite rising of 1715 and was rewarded by being pardoned for his crimes. In 1730, he won litigation to confirm his title of Lord Lovat. In 1745 Lord Lovat participated in the Jacobite rising of 1745 (the '45) against the Crown and was sentenced to death. He was beheaded on 9 April 1747, aged 80, on Tower Hill in London, the last man to be executed in this manner. His titles were forfeit. Fraser had been created Duke of Fraser, Marquess of Beaufort, Earl of Stratherrick and Upper Tarf, Viscount of the Aird and Strathglass and Lord Lovat and Beaulieu in the Jacobite Peerage of Scotland by James Francis Edward Stuart (titular King James III of England and VIII of Scotland) in 1740.

His eldest son and namesake General Simon Fraser of Lovat became a general in the British Army. He obtained a full pardon but was not restored to the title. His younger brother Archibald Campbell Fraser was a colonel in the Army and would have succeeded but for the attainder. On his death in 1815 the title was claimed by his kinsman Thomas Fraser, a descendant of Thomas Fraser, second son of the fourth Lord. In 1837 he was created Baron Lovat, of Lovat in the County of Inverness, in the Peerage of the United Kingdom. The attainder of the eleventh Lord was reversed in 1854, and Thomas Fraser became the twelfth Lord Lovat. He was succeeded by his son, the thirteenth Lord, who served as Lord Lieutenant of Inverness. His eldest son, the fourteenth Lord, was a soldier and politician and notably held office as Under-Secretary of State for Dominion Affairs from 1926 to 1927. He was succeeded by his eldest son, Simon Fraser, 15th Lord Lovat, a prominent soldier who distinguished himself during the Second World War. As of 2017 the titles are held by his grandson, the sixteenth Lord, who succeeded in 1995.

The Conservative politician Sir Hugh Fraser was the younger son of the fourteenth Lord. Another member of the family was Sir Ian Fraser, Chairman of Rolls-Royce Motors. He was the son of Hon. Alastair Thomas Joseph Fraser, younger son of the thirteenth Lord.

The family seats are Beaufort Lodge and Balblair House, near Beauly, Inverness-shire.

== Clan Fraser of Lovat ==
The Lordship of Lovat has for some time been linked to the Chiefship of Clan Fraser of Lovat. The former family seat was Beaufort Castle in northern Scotland. The numbering of the Scottish Lordship used by Clan Fraser of Lovat differs from the legal numbering in that it ignores the attainder of 1747–1854, with the result that the 16th Lord is termed by them "18th Lord Lovat".

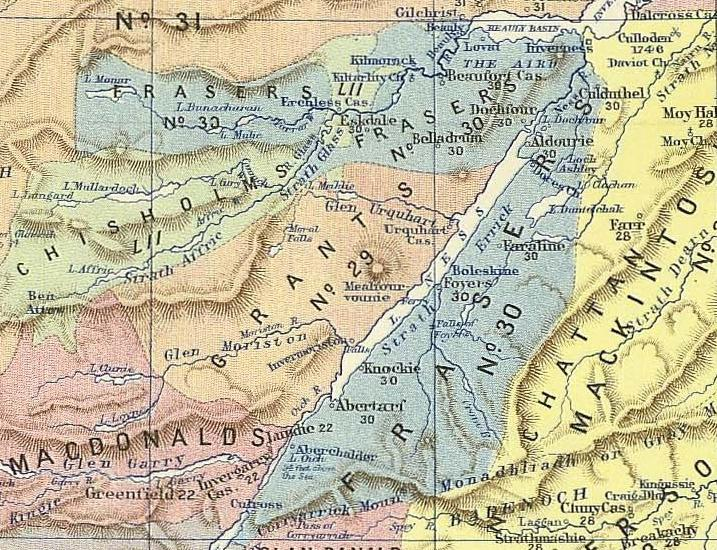
Fraser lands are shown in blue. Beaufort Castle and Lovat are to the left of the V/Inverness of the Fraser Lands. This map is accurate to the acts of parliament 1587 & 1594. Click to enlarge.

== Lairds of Lovat ==
=== According to John Anderson and Alexander Mackenzie ===
19th century historians John Anderson, writing in 1825, and Alexander Mackenzie, writing in 1896, list the Lairds of Lovat as follows, but this is different to modern research as given by the Clan Fraser of Lovat organization.

- Simon Fraser, 1st Laird of Lovat (son of Andrew Fraser and was killed at the Battle of Halidon Hill in 1333)
- Simon Fraser, 2nd Laird of Lovat (wounded at the Battle of Durham in 1346 and died in 1347)
- Hugh Fraser, 3rd Laird of Lovat (died in 1397 and buried at Beauly)
- Alexander Fraser, 4th Laird of Lovat (succeeded in 1415).

=== According to James Balfour Paul ===
James Balfour Paul writing in 1908 in his The Scots Peerage gives the following Fraser Lairds of Lovat before the family succeeded as Lords Lovat:

- Hugh Fraser of Lovat and Kinnell (on record 1367–1410)
- Alexander Fraser of Lovat (died before March 1415–16)
- Hugh Fraser of Lovat (son of Hugh Fraser of Lovat and died before 20 July 1440)
- Thomas Fraser of Lovat (died before 20 May 1455)

=== According to the modern Clan Fraser of Lovat ===
The modern Clan Fraser of Lovat records the Lairds of Lovat as follows:

- Sir Simon Fraser (son of Andrew Fraser and was killed at the Battle of Halidon Hill in 1333)
- Alexander Fraser (died 1361)
- Hugh Fraser, 1st Laird Lovat (died before 1410)
- Hugh Fraser, Laird of Lovat (died 1440)
- Thomas Fraser, Laird of Lovat (died by 1455)

== Lords Fraser of Lovat (1458); Barons Lovat of Lovat (1837) ==
Mackenzie also records the names of the subsequent Lords Lovat differently, when compared to the accepted modern version given below. Anderson lists the same lineage as given below, but his designation of which sons actually succeeded to the title of the Lordship is different, when compared to the accepted modern version given below. Bernard Burke, in his 1869 A Genealogical And Heraldic Dictionary of The Peerage And Baronetage of The British Empire, lists the first two Lords as Hugh Fraser, 1st Lord Lovat and Hugh Fraser, 2nd Lord Lovat with Hugh Fraser, 3rd Lord Lovat, being the same person listed as Hugh Fraser, 1st Lord Lovat in the accepted modern version given below. The Clan Fraser of Lovat organization also recognises the two sons of the 11th Lord Lovat, Simon and Archibald, as the 12th and 13th Lords Lovat respectively, ignoring the attainder for the 11th Lord having supported the Jacobite rising of 1745 and therefore they recognize the current 16th Lord Lovat as the 18th Lord Lovat. The following is also in accordance with James Balfour Paul's 1908 volume 5 of The Scots Peerage, which lists the aforementioned Simon and Archibald as the "de jure" 12th and 13th Lords Lovat before reverting to Thomas Alexander Fraser, 12th Lord Lovat proper who was from the Fraser of Strichen cadet branch.

- Hugh Fraser, 1st Lord Lovat (c.1436–1501)
- Thomas Fraser, 2nd Lord Lovat (c.1461–1524)
- Hugh Fraser, 3rd Lord Lovat (c.1494–1544)
- Alexander Fraser, 4th Lord Lovat (c.1527–1557)
- Hugh Fraser, 5th Lord Lovat (c.1545–1577)
- Simon Fraser, 6th Lord Lovat (1570–1633)
- Hugh Fraser, 7th Lord Lovat (1591–1646)
- Hugh Fraser, 8th Lord Lovat (1643–1672)
- Hugh Fraser, 9th Lord Lovat (1666–1696)
- Thomas Fraser, 10th Lord Lovat (1631–1699)
- Simon Fraser, 11th Lord Lovat (c. 1667–1747) (lordship forfeited in 1746)
- heirs but for the attainder:
  - Simon Fraser of Lovat (1726–1782)
  - Archibald Campbell Fraser of Lovat (1736–1815)
- Thomas Alexander Fraser, 12th Lord Lovat, 1st Baron Lovat (1802–1875) (lordship restored in 1854; barony of Lovat created in 1837)
- Simon Fraser, 13th Lord Lovat, 2nd Baron Lovat (1828–1887)
- Simon Joseph Fraser, 14th Lord Lovat, 3rd Baron Lovat (1871–1933)
- Simon Christopher Joseph Fraser, 15th Lord Lovat, 4th Baron Lovat (1911–1995)
- Simon Christopher Joseph Fraser, 16th Lord Lovat, 5th Baron Lovat (b. 1977)

The heir presumptive is the present holder's brother Hon. Jack Hugh Fraser, Master of Lovat (b. 1984)

== Arms ==
Coat of arms of Lord Lovat
| Adopted c. 1253 Crest Issuant from a ducal coronet Or, a stag's head erased; Torse Mantling gules and ermine, for a peer of the UK Helm Upon a coronet of a baron of the UK/Lord of Parliament of Scotland Proper, the helm of a nobleman argent with bars or. Escutcheon Blazon: Quarterly 1st & 4th Azure three fraises Argent 2nd & 3rd Argent three antique crowns Gules. Supporters two stags; Motto JE SUIS PREST Badge Clan member crest badge - Clan Fraser of lovat.svg Symbolism: "Strawberry" in French is fraise (feminine), and its pronunciation is close to that of Fraser. The strawberry plant, used in the coat of arms of the Fraser Clan of the Scottish Lowlands as well as in the Frasers of Lovat in the Highlands, is called a fraisier.; The Fraser motto, "Je suis prest" uses an ancient spelling. In modern French spelling, the "s" has disappeared and a circumflex is on top of the "e" ("je suis prêt"). |
