= Beauly =

Town in Scottish Highlands

Coordinates: 57.484662°N 4.462035°W

Beauly: Scottish Gaelic: A' Mhanachainn
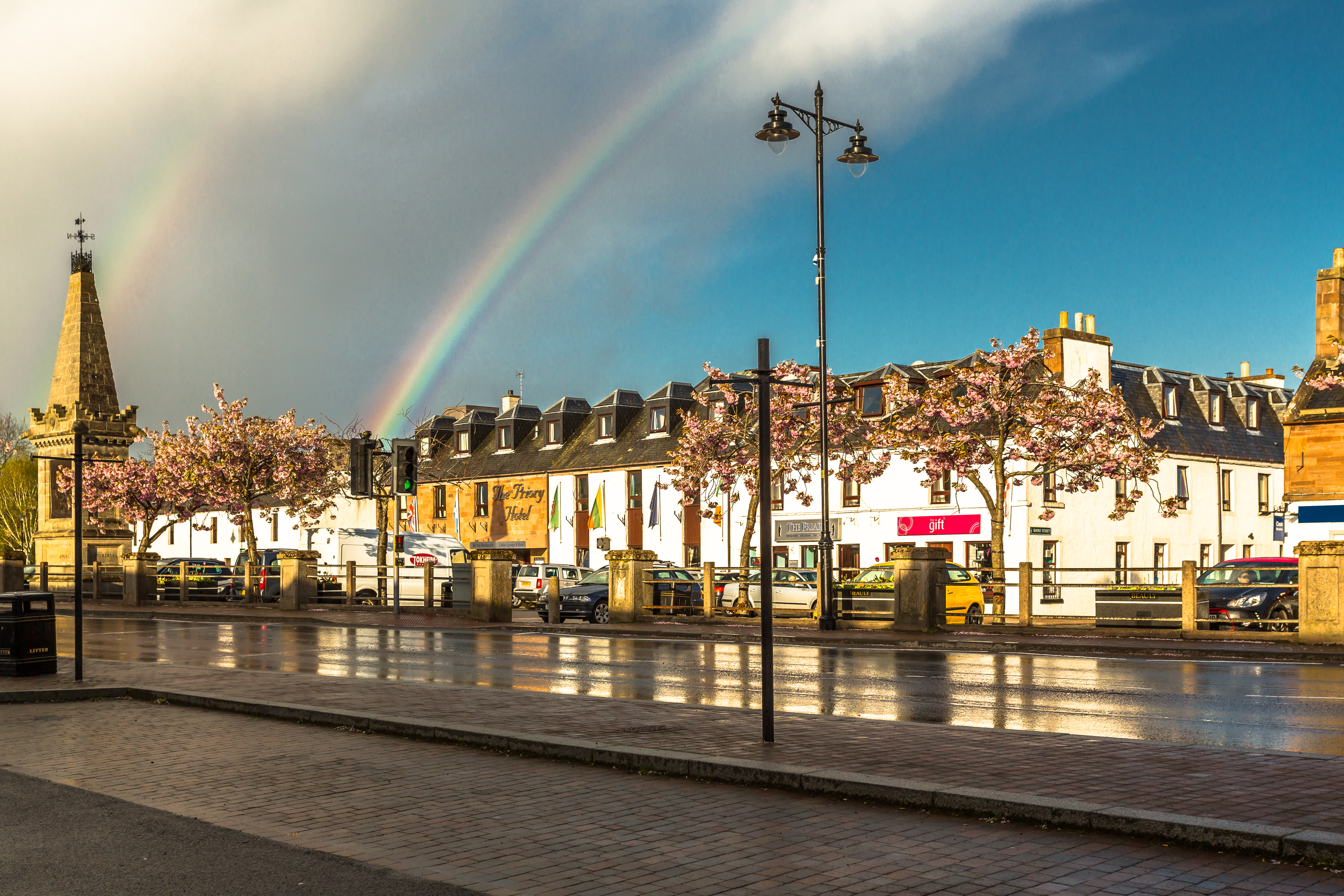
- Beauly Square

- Location within the Highland council area Beauly (Highland)
- Population: 1,400 (2020)
- OS grid reference: NH525465
- Community council: Beauly
- Council area: Highland
- Lieutenancy area: Inverness
- Country: Scotland
- Sovereign state: United Kingdom
- Post town: Beauly
- Postcode district: IV4
- Dialling code: 01463
- Police: Scotland
- Fire: Scottish
- Ambulance: Scottish
- UK Parliament: Caithness, Sutherland and Easter Ross
- Scottish Parliament: Skye, Lochaber and Badenoch

Beauly (/ˈbjuːli/ BEW-lee; from French beau lieu 'beautiful place'; Scottish Gaelic: A' Mhanachainn) is a village in Scotland's Highland area, on the River Beauly, 12 miles (19 km) west of Inverness by the Far North railway line. The town is historically within Kilmorack Parish of the County of Inverness.

The land around Beauly is fertile - historically corn was grown extensively and more recently fruit has successfully been farmed. The village historically traded in coal, timber, lime, grain, and fish.

== History ==
Arms of the Community Council

=== Early years ===
Beauly is the site of the Beauly Priory, or the Priory Church of the Blessed Virgin and John the Baptist, founded in 1230 by John Byset of the Aird, for Valliscaulian monks. Following the Reformation, the buildings (except for the church, which is now a ruin) passed into the possession of Lord Lovat.

Local tradition has it that Mary, Queen of Scots, once visited Beauly and had exclaimed: "Ç'est un beau lieu", whereby came the name Beauly. Queen Mary, in 1563, hunted and took her summer journeys in the west and southwest of Scotland; but her brother James Stewart, 1st Earl of Moray, came north to Inverness late in the autumn, with his two brothers, to hold courts and consolidate his power, and there first put into execution the new Act against witchcraft, sorcery, and necromancy, by burning two old women as witches.

It was probably in 1564 that Queen Mary paid that visit to Beauly Priory, the memory of which is preserved in local tradition. She left Edinburgh on 22nd and Perth on 31 July, and proceeded to Athole to the hunting; she then passed the Mounth into Badenoch, and thence to Inverness, and from Inverness to the Chanonry of Ross. Mr Chalmers suggests, with considerable probability, that her object was to inquire into the nature and value of the earldom of Ross, which she meant to settle upon Darnley, whom she had determined to marry, and she would naturally go to Dingwall, which was the head of the earldom, the castle of Dingwall being its manor-place. Going to Dingwall from Inverness, she must have passed by Beauly; and it was therefore, probably, on a bright morning in August 1564 that she opened the window at the prior’s house, and looking out on the gardens, eulogised the beauty of the spot and the appropriateness of its name.

Beauly is also the site of Lovat Castle, which once belonged to the Bissets, but was presented by James VI, to Hugh Fraser, 5th Lord Lovat, and later demolished.

The population of Beauly was 855 in 1901. In 1905 a memorial was unveiled to the Lovat Scouts. It cost £500 and is fifty four foot high.

=== Recent history ===
In 1994 Simon Fraser, 15th Lord Lovat sold Beaufort castle to Ann Gloag (director of the Stagecoach Group) to pay off debts.

In 2002, the Beauly railway station, built in 1862 and closed in 1960, was renovated and reopened.

In January 2010, the Scottish government approved controversial plans for a power line upgrade that will begin in Beauly and end in Denny, Falkirk. The new power line, part of a plan to carry electricity generated by wind farms on the Western Isles, was called "the most significant grid infrastructure project in a generation" by Jim Mather MSP. The 220-kilometre (140 mi) line will consist of a network of 600 pylons, ranging in height from 42 to 65 metres (138 to 213 ft). The first part of the transmission circuit (Beauly to Fort Augustus) was switched on in July 2013.

The population of Beauly was 1,126 in 1991, 1,283 in 2001, and 1,365 in 2011.

== Governance ==
Beauly is in the Aird and Loch Ness Ward of the Highland Council.

== Attractions ==
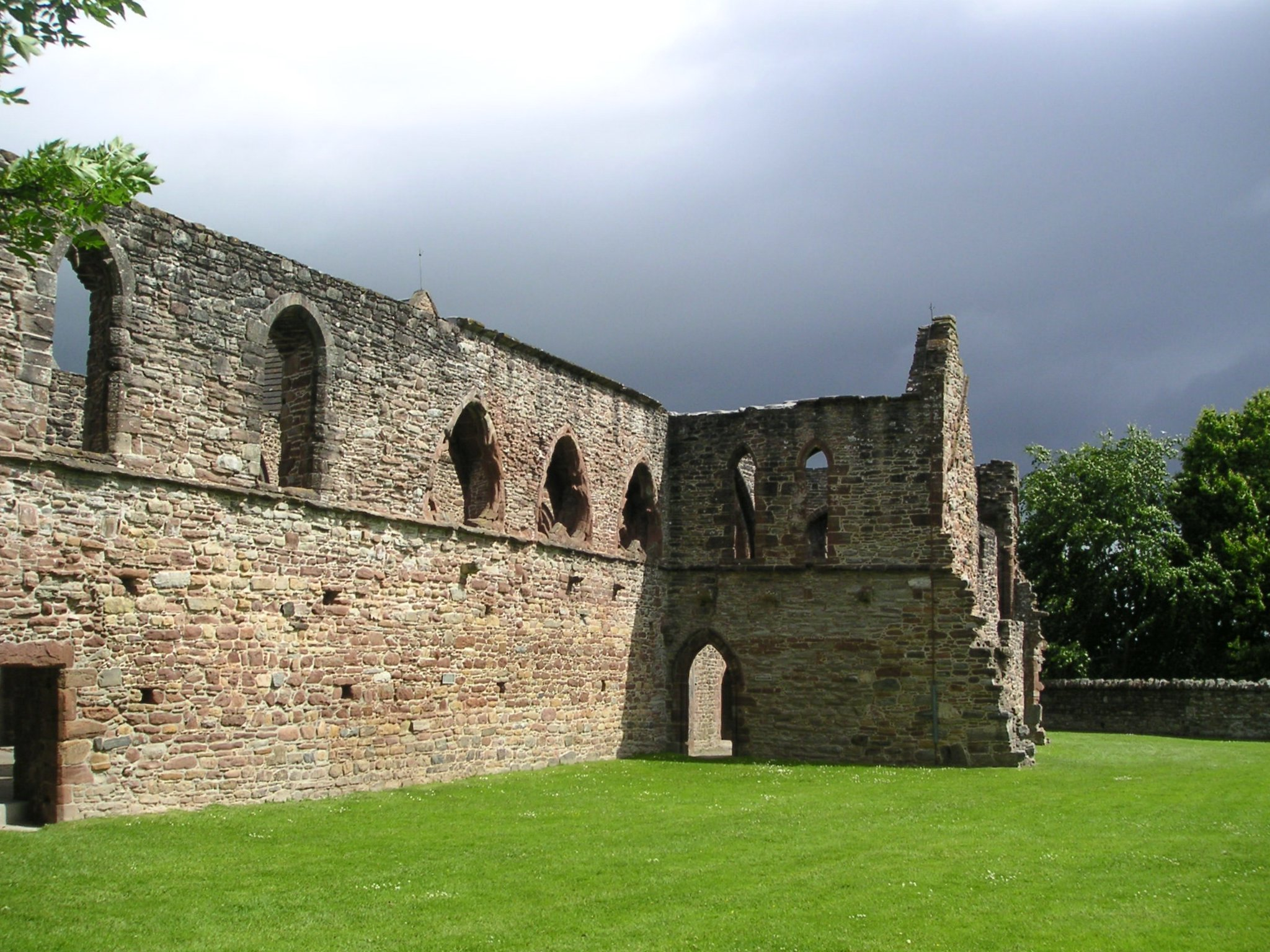
Beauly Priory

=== Beaufort Castle ===
3 miles (5 km) south of Beauly is Beaufort Castle, the chief seat of the Lovats, a modern mansion in the Scottish baronial style. It occupies the site of a fortress erected in the time of Alexander II, which was besieged in 1303 by Edward I. This was replaced by several castles in succession. One of these, Castle Dounie, was attacked and burned by the forces of Oliver Cromwell in 1650 and razed again by the royal army of Prince William, Duke of Cumberland, in 1746 during the Jacobite Rising. Simon Fraser, 11th Lord Lovat, witnessed this latter conflagration of his castle from a neighbouring hill (he then fled and took refuge in the Highlands before his capture on Loch Morar).

=== Beauly Priory ===
The extensive ruins of the abbey church of Beauly Priory with funerary monuments (notably including those of the Mackenzie family) are managed by Historic Scotland.

=== Churches ===
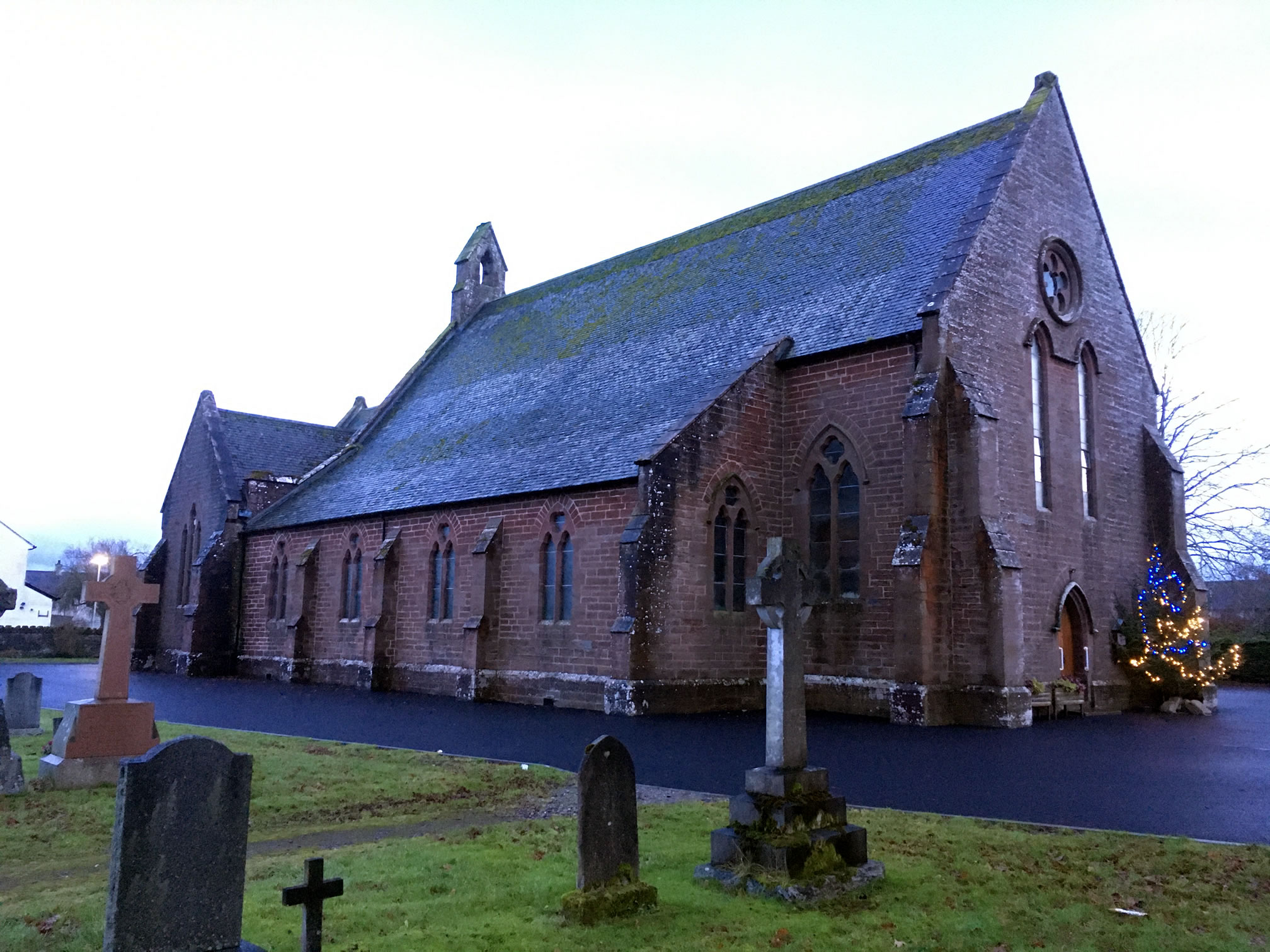
St Mary's Roman Catholic Church

The large red sandstone church on the north boundary of the village was designed by Victorian era Gothic Revival architect Joseph Aloysius Hansom and funded by Thomas Fraser, 12th Lord Lovat. The nave, chancel, north aisle and adjoining house were built as a unit. It opened for worship on Sunday 13 November 1864. It was named St Mary's and was the first proper Catholic chapel built in Beauly. The church grounds also contain a bullaun, or natural cup stone, used during the Penal Laws by three outlawed Jesuit priests, Charles and John Farquharson and Alexander Cameron, to perform Catholic baptisms inside a cave at the Brae of Craskie in Glen Cannich. The cup stone was later removed from the cave, "in order to protect it from damage", by Black Watch Captain Archibald Macrae Chisholm and placed upon a stone column at St. Mary's Church.

To the southeast of Beauly is the church of Kirkhill, Highland containing the vault of the Lovats as well as a number of septs of the Mackenzies, including Seaforth and Mackenzies of Gairloch.

== Sport ==
The town is known for the Beauly Shinty Club, its shinty team, who have won the Camanachd Cup three times and have been World Champions once.

== Notable residents ==
- Simon Fraser, 15th Lord Lovat, 25th Chief of the Clan Fraser of Lovat and a prominent British Commando during the Second World War.

== See also ==
- Beauly Firth
