= Beaufort Castle, Scotland =

Baronial style mansion built in 1880 and incorporating older building work

Coordinates: 57°27′11″N 4°29′24″W

Designations

Inventory of Gardens and Designed Landscapes in Scotland
- Official name: Beaufort Castle
- Designated: 30 March 2003
- Reference no.: GDL00052

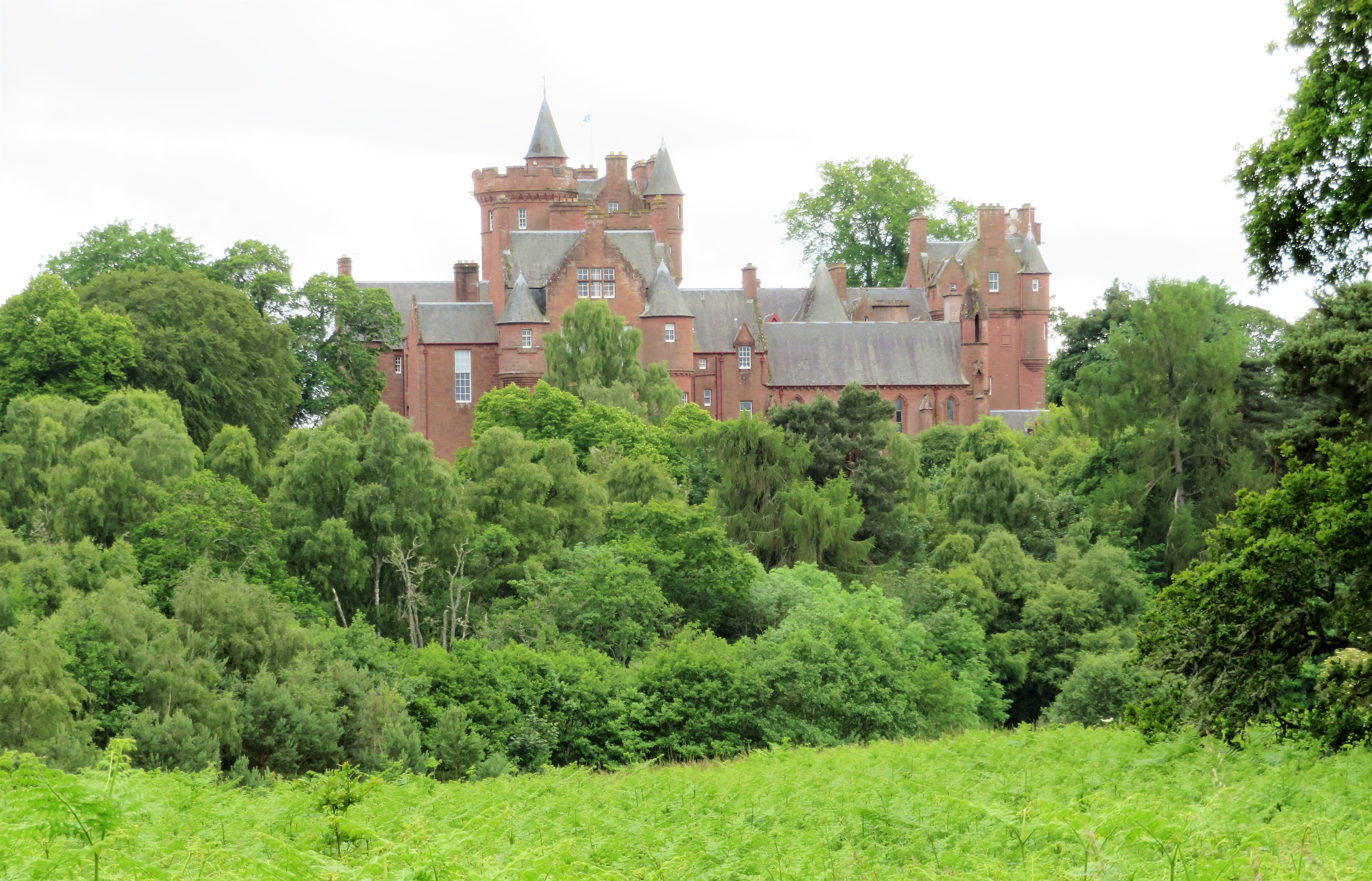
Beaufort Castle

Beaufort Castle or Castle Dounie (Scottish Gaelic: Caisteal Dhùnaidh) is a baronial style mansion built in 1880 and incorporating older building work. It is situated on the right bank of the River Beauly near the town of Beauly in Inverness-shire and is 1 mile (1.6 km) north of Kiltarlity and 13 mi (21 km) west of Inverness. There has been a castle on the site since the 12th century. Beaufort Castle is the traditional seat of the Lords Lovat, Chiefs of Clan Fraser of Lovat.

== History ==
The earliest mention of the site, as Downie or Dounie Castle, occurs in the reign of Alexander I (1106–1124), when a siege took place. The original castle was built by the Byset family. The castle came into the hands of the Fentons in the late 13th century and later into the hands of the Frasers. English forces besieged the castle in 1303.

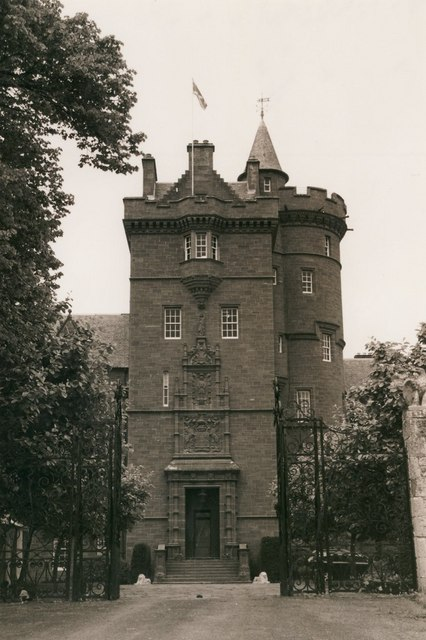
The main tower of Beaufort Castle

In the 1650s Dounie was attacked and burned by the forces of Oliver Cromwell during their invasion of Scotland.

In 1699 the Fraser estates were inherited by Simon Fraser, 11th Lord Lovat (c.1667–1747). Known as "The Fox", Lovat became deeply involved in the Jacobite cause, which aimed to restore the deposed House of Stuart to the thrones of Scotland and England. Exiled to France, Lovat joined James Stuart, the Old Pretender, and converted to Catholicism. He attempted to recruit Scottish nobles to the cause and carried messages to Scotland, but his activities led to ten years imprisonment in France. On returning in 1714, he apparently renounced the Jacobite cause in return for possession of his estates. In the 1740s he commissioned William Adam to design a new house at Dounie. This was Adam's last work, but only the supply of stonework to the site was completed, and construction never started because the Jacobite Rising of 1745 intervened. Lovat changed allegiance again and supported the Jacobites, but he was captured and executed after the Battle of Culloden. Dounie Castle was razed by the Duke of Cumberland, and the estate was declared forfeit.

From 1746 the estate was run by the Forfeited Estates Commissioners, appointed by Parliament to dispose of confiscated estates, and a small house was built on the site of the demolished castle to house the factor (estate manager). In 1774 the estate was returned to Lovat's son, Simon Fraser of Lovat (1726–1782), who had raised and commanded the 78th Fraser Highlanders for the British Army. Proposals for a new house on the site were put forward in 1777 but not executed. In 1815 the estate was inherited by Thomas Fraser of Strichen (1802–1875), who was reinstated to the Lordship of Lovat in 1854. In 1839 he commissioned William Burn to extend the house, and also improved the grounds and estate. His son Simon Fraser, 13th Lord Lovat (1828–1887), built the present Beaufort Castle, to designs by James Maitland Wardrop, incorporating part of the 18th-century house.

Simon Fraser, Master of Lovat accumulated an estimated £7m in debts. The castle was sold in 1994 to Stagecoach director Ann Gloag by the 15th Lord Lovat, to meet inheritance taxes.

== Description ==
The Baronial mansion includes a private Roman Catholic chapel. The remains of Dounie Castle stand beside the house, and consist of a single wall, 11 metres (36 ft) long and 1.5 metres (4 ft 11 in) high. A plaque on the wall states that it is "the ruin of Castle Downie, the ancient stronghold of the Frasers of Lovat, built c. 1400, and destroyed by Cumberland after the battle of Culloden".

The house is a category A listed building. The grounds are included in the Inventory of Gardens and Designed Landscapes, the national listing of significant gardens in Scotland.

== See also ==
- Castles in Great Britain and Ireland
- List of castles in Scotland
