= Alexander Fraser, 4th Lord Lovat =

Scottish peer and Chief of Clan Fraser of Lovat

- Born: 1527
- Died: 1557/1558
- Title: Lord (Fraser) of Lovat
- Predecessor: Hugh Fraser, 3rd Lord Lovat
- Successor: Hugh Fraser, 5th Lord Lovat
- Spouse: Janet Campbell
- Parent(s): Hugh Fraser, 3rd Lord Lovat; Anna Grant (d. c.1536)

Alexander Fraser, 4th Lord Lovat (1527 – 1557/1558) was a Scottish peer and Chief of Clan Fraser of Lovat from 1544 until 1557. He succeeded to the chiefship in July 1544, aged seventeen, after his father Hugh Fraser, 3rd Lord Lovat and elder brother Simon were killed in the battle of Loch Lochy. He was made the legal ward of Robert Reid, Bishop of Orkney (d. 1558), who was a relative of his mother's. In 1555 he waited on Mary of Guise when she came to Inverness to hold assizes. He died of rheumatism in 1557/1558.

== Marriage and family ==
Lovat married Janet Campbell (died 1592), daughter of Sir John Campbell of Cawdor Castle, a son of Archibald Campbell, 2nd Earl of Argyll. Their children included:

- Hugh Fraser, 5th Lord Lovat
- Thomas Fraser of Knockie and Strichen
- James Fraser of Ardochy
- Anna Fraser, who married John Fraser of Dalcrosa, also called John Mor MacVaister

When Janet Campbell died in 1592 she left her two silver goblets, a bed with "Scottish green" curtains, and the high table of Dalcross Castle to her grandson Simon Fraser, Lord Lovat.

Peerage of Scotland
Preceded by Hugh Fraser	Lord Lovat; 1554–c. 1558	Succeeded by Hugh Fraser
