= Hugh Fraser, 5th Lord Lovat =

English noble (c. 1545–1577)

Arms of the Lords Lovat: Quarterly: 1st & 4th; Azure, three fraises argent, 2nd & 3rd; Argent, three antique crowns gules.

Hugh Fraser, 5th Lord Lovat (c. 1545–1577) was a Scottish landowner.

He was the son of Alexander Fraser, 4th Lord Lovat (d. 1557) and Janet Campell, a daughter of John Campbell of Cawdor. He was known as "Red Hugh" from the colour of his hair.

After his father died in 1557 his estates were managed for a time by his uncle, William Fraser of Struy, Tutor of Lovat, and he was educated by monks at Beauly Priory. In May 1562 the Tutor of Lovat and young Lord Hugh came to Inverness to meet Mary, Queen of Scots with 400 followers. His grandmother Janet Ross told Mary that she had met her mother Mary of Guise there (in 1556).

He went to Edinburgh in 1569 and made friends with Regent Moray, who he welcomed at Inverness in May 1569. Lovat attended the Convention of the Estates at Perth in July 1569.

According to the 17th-century family historian, James Fraser, Lovat enjoyed archery, football, horse racing, and tilting, meeting other landowners including John Grant at the Chapel yard in Inverness for these sports.

In 1573, the Earl of Sutherland was petitioning to have himself served as heir to the Earldom at Aberdeen and not at Inverness because no jury was able to sit at the latter due to Colin Cam Mackenzie, 11th of Kintail, Hugh Fraser, 5th Lord Lovat, Robert Mor Munro, 15th Baron of Foulis and Lachlan Mor Mackintosh, 16th of Mackintosh all being at deadly feud with each other. The feud was over a dispute between the Mackenzies and Munros to hold Chanonry Castle in Fortrose. The Frasers supported the Munros and the Mackintoshes supported the Mackenzies. The feud was ended after much blood-shed, when arbiters, one of whom was Mackintosh, decided that it belonged to Mackenzie. The Frasers of Lovat had long been dominant in the area that is known as The Aird, so much so that possessions in it by other families were almost unknown or forgotten about. The grandfather of Lachlan Mor Mackintosh, 16th chief was Lachlan Mackintosh, 14th chief who by 1520 had acquired a considerable estate in The Aird. Lachlan Mor Mackintosh, 16th chief had also done much to enlarge and consolidate his family's estates. 19th century writer John Anderson's History of the Frasers of Lovat states that the family of Mackintosh held large possessions in The Aird which Lord Lovat was very anxious to get his own hands on, and this was shortly after the time of Lachlan Mor Mackintosh, 16th chief.

In 1574, Lovat was made captain of Inverness Castle by Regent Morton. In February 1576, Donald McAngus of Glengarry complained to the Privy Council that Lovat had prevented him and his followers transporting timber by water on Loch Ness towards Inverness, and Lovat was ordered not to interfere.

He died at Towie Barclay on 1 January 1577.

== Family ==
He married Elizabeth Stewart, daughter of John Stewart, 4th Earl of Atholl and Elizabeth Gordon. Their children included:

- Alexander Fraser, who married the daughter of the Laird of Moniak
- Simon Fraser, 6th Lord Lovat, who married Jean Stewart, daughter of James Stewart, 1st Lord Doune and Margaret Campbell, a lady in waiting to Anne of Denmark.
- Anna Fraser (?-Glenmoriston, Urquhart, Inverness-shire, 20 December 1681), who married Hector Munro of Foulis
- Mary or Margaret Fraser, who married James Cumming of Altyre (1570-1625), and had issue

Peerage of Scotland
Preceded by Alexander Fraser	Lord Lovat c.1558–1577	Succeeded by Simon Fraser
