= Culburnie, Highland =

Coordinates: 57.438°N 4.522°W

Culburnie: Scottish Gaelic: Cùil Braonaigh; Scots: Chainry
- Location within the Inverness area
- Population: 121
- OS grid reference: NH486414
- Council area: Highland
- Country: Scotland
- Sovereign state: United Kingdom
- Post town: Kiltarlity
- Postcode district: IV4 7
- Police: Scotland
- Fire: Scottish
- Ambulance: Scottish
- UK Parliament: Inverness, Nairn, Badenoch and Strathspey
- Scottish Parliament: Skye, Lochaber and Badenoch

Culburnie (Scottish Gaelic: Cùil Braonaigh, Scots: Chainry) is a scattered hamlet in the Highland council area of Scotland. It is 1.2 miles (2 km) west of Kiltarlity, and 12.4 miles (20 km) west of Inverness.

The name may come from the Gaelic term for "at the back of the damp place".

Until 1968, Culburnie had its own primary school, built sometime in the 19th century by the Free Church of Scotland. Primary pupils now travel to the nearby school at Tomnacross, while secondary students attend Charleston Academy in Inverness.

The Culburnie Burn (also known as the Teanacoil Burn) passes through the area before flowing into the Bruiach Burn, which in turn joins the Beauly River and Firth.

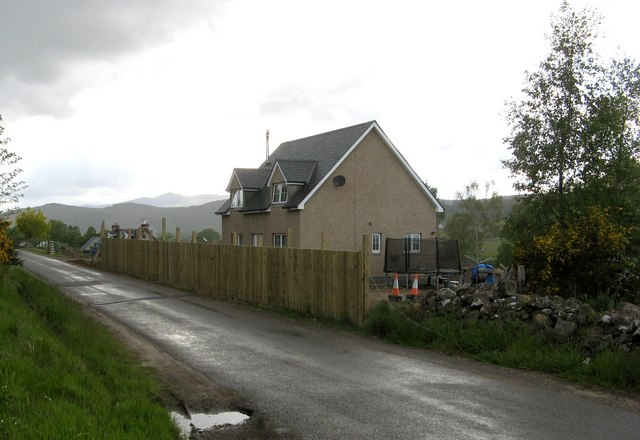
One of several houses in the Culburnie area
