= Lentran =

Coordinates: 57.47564°N 4.36900°W

- Location within the Inverness area
- OS grid reference: NH580453
- Council area: Highland
- Country: Scotland
- Sovereign state: United Kingdom
- Post town: Inverness
- Postcode district: IV3 8
- Police: Scotland
- Fire: Scottish
- Ambulance: Scottish
- UK Parliament: Caithness, Sutherland and Easter Ross
- Scottish Parliament: Skye, Lochaber and Badenoch

Lentran is a small hamlet in the Highland council area of Scotland. It is 1.8 miles (3 km) east of Kirkhill and 5 miles (8 km) west of Inverness, on the south shore of the Beauly Firth.

The area was served by Lentran railway station as part of the Inverness and Ross-shire Railway, which opened in 1862. However, the station closed to passengers in 1960 and goods in 1964.

In the past, Lentran was part of a much larger area of land known as Drumchardine (now situated just south of Inchmore). In the late 17th century however, the lands making up the hamlet were bought by John Mackenzie of Clan MacFarlane. They were then sold to a Mr. Warrand in 1787, and until 1812 the estate was known as "Warrandfield". It was then bought by Major Thomas Fraser of Clan Fraser, and restored to its former name.

The name Lentran is of uncertain origin; some theories suggest it was previously called "Lanthon", though this is disputed.

In July 1963, Lentran saw a flock of 153 Canada geese land on its shores, following a few, much smaller incidents in Yorkshire the year before. This was the first evidence of moult-migration for the bird within the British Isles.

== Lentran House ==
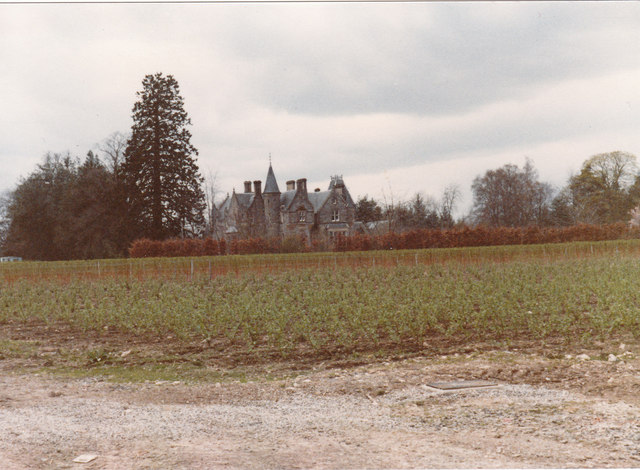
Lentran House, November 1986

In the area is Lentran House, a Scottish Baronial style mansion built in 1866, now a Category B listed building. It was formerly home to the Provost of Inverness, and later used as a nursing home. During the Second World War Lentran House was used as a camp for a Royal Air Force maintenance unit - evidence of this can be seen in murals, left by the troops on the cellar walls.

In the 1970s Lentran House was the base for local raspberry picking and freezing operations run by a family from Cheshire, who were based at nearby Perimeter Farms Ltd. facility at Lentran Fruit Farm. It has since been developed into a luxury apartment block.

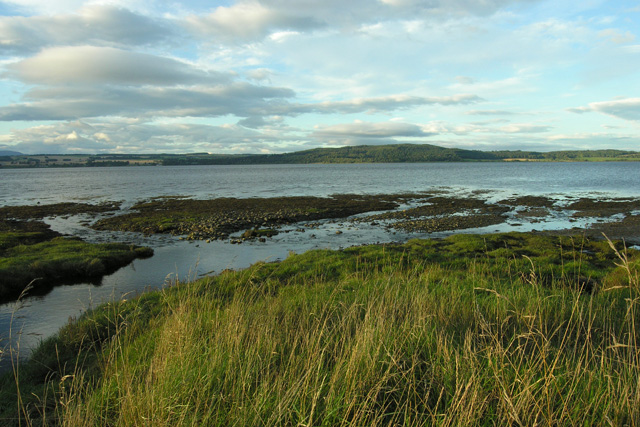
Mouth of the Inchberry Burn, flowing through Lentran and into the Beauly Firth

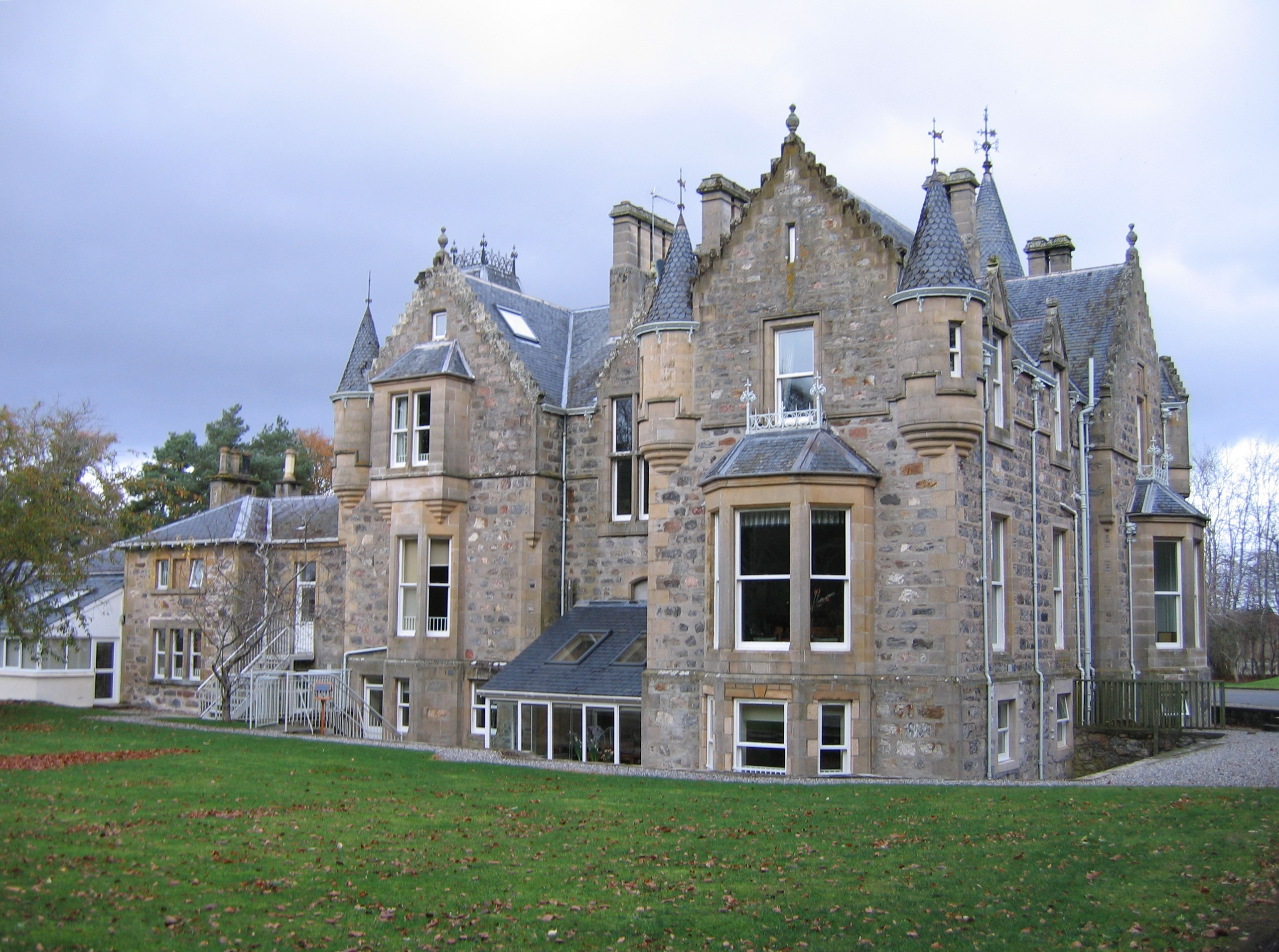
Lentran House from its grounds
