= Clunes railway station (Scotland) =

Disused railway station in Highland, Scotland

Clunes
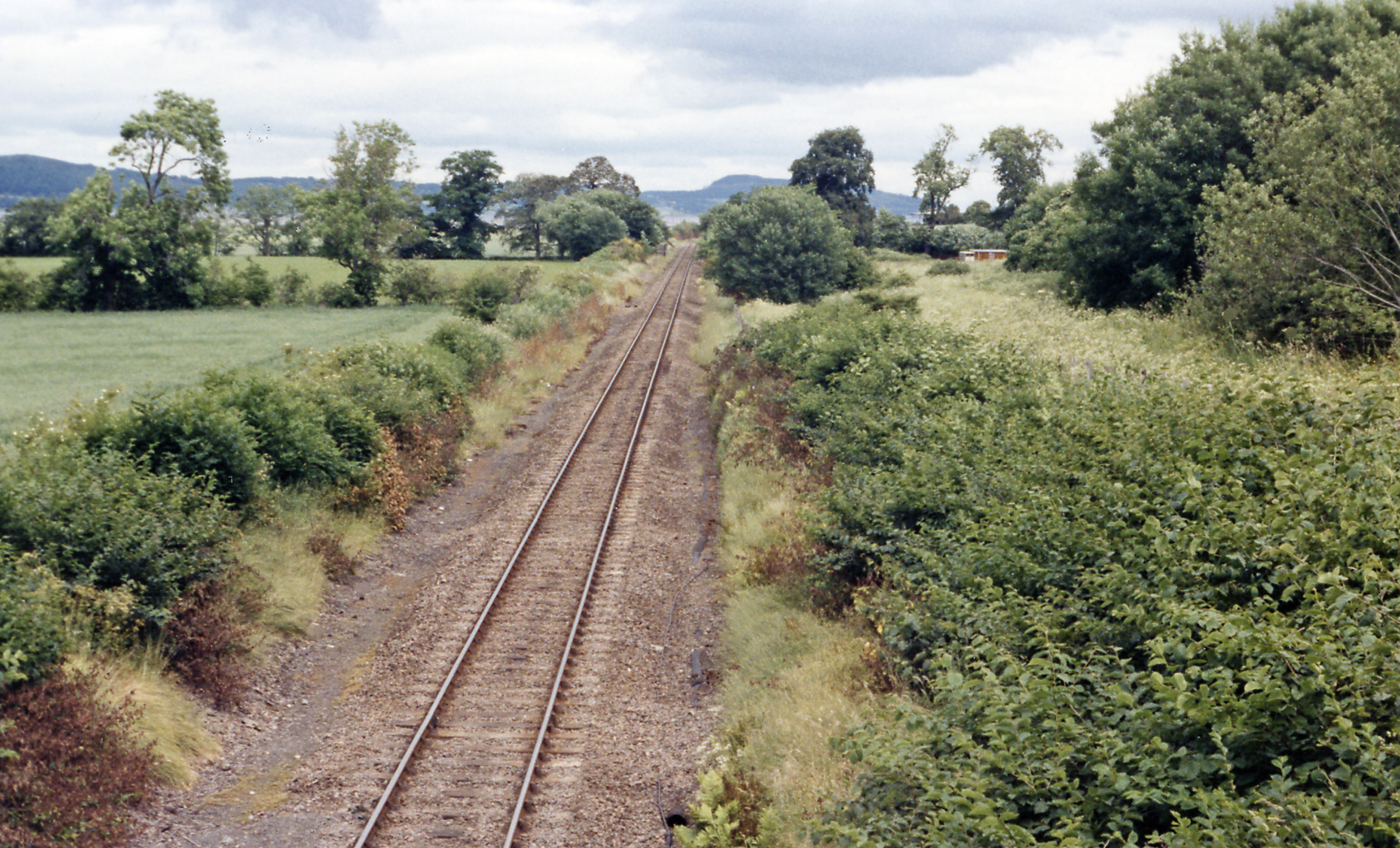
- View towards the site of the station, 1986

General information
- Location: Near Kirkhill, Highland; Scotland
- Coordinates: 57.484°N 4.406°W
- Grid reference: NH558463
- Platforms: 2

Other information
- Status: Disused

History
- Original company: Inverness and Ross-shire Railway
- Pre-grouping: Highland Railway
- Post-grouping: London, Midland and Scottish Railway

Key dates
- 20 August 1863: Station opened
- 13 June 1960: Closed to passengers
- 27 January 1964: Closed to goods
Location

Clunes railway station was a railway station on the Inverness and Ross-shire Railway, on the Inverness to Dingwall section. It was situated to the north of the village of Kirkhill.

The line became part of the Highland Railway on 1 February 1865, then, at grouping in 1923, it became part of the London Midland and Scottish Railway.

A passing loop was opened at Clunes in 1904. In 1914, this became the end of a 6 mile long double track section from Clachnaharry. This section reverted to single track in 1966.

Preceding station	Historical railways	Following station
Lentran; Line open; Station closed	Highland Railway; Inverness and Ross-shire Railway	Beauly; Line and station open
