= Bunchrew railway station =

Disused railway station in Highland, Scotland

Bunchrew
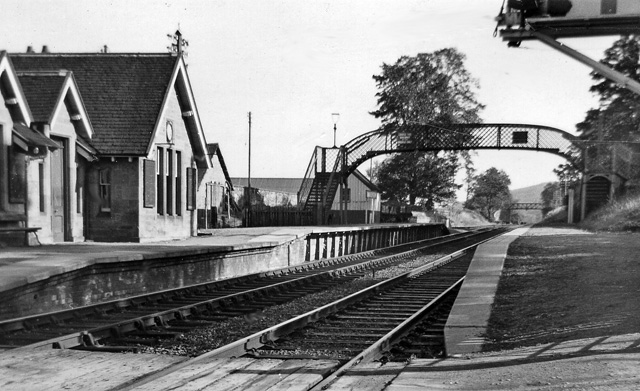
- The station in 1961

General information
- Location: Bunchrew, Highland; Scotland
- Coordinates: 57.4783°N 4.3089°W
- Grid reference: NH616454
- Platforms: 2

Other information
- Status: Disused

History
- Original company: Inverness and Aberdeen Junction Railway
- Pre-grouping: Highland Railway
- Post-grouping: London, Midland and Scottish Railway

Key dates
- 11 June 1862: Opened
- 13 June 1960: Closed to passengers
- 27 January 1964: Closed completely
Location

Bunchrew railway station served the village of Bunchrew, Highland, Scotland from 1862 to 1964 on the Inverness and Ross-shire Railway.

== History ==
The station opened on 11 June 1862 by the Inverness and Aberdeen Junction Railway.

The station was host to a LMS caravan from 1936 to 1939.

The station closed to passengers on 13 June 1960 and to goods traffic on 27 January 1964.

Preceding station	Historical railways	Following station
Clachnaharry; Line open, station closed	Highland Railway; Inverness and Ross-shire Railway	Lentran; Line open, station closed
