= Charleston Academy =

Secondary school in Inverness, Scotland

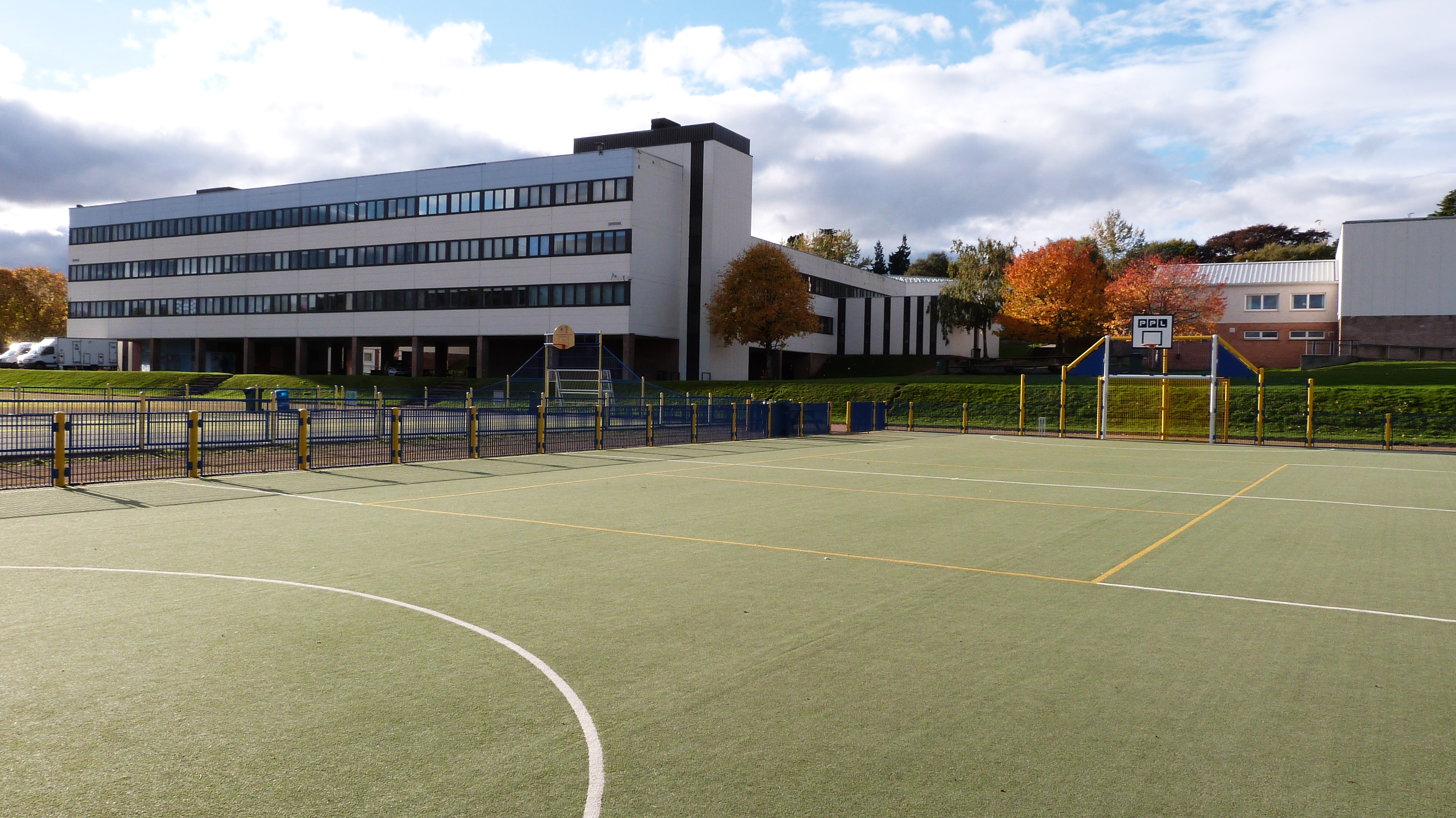

Location
- Kinmylies; Inverness, IV3 8ET; Scotland; 57°16′52″N 4°09′07″W

Information
- Type: Secondary school, state funded
- Established: 1978
- Local authority: Highland Council
- Parent Council Chair: Kate Morris
- Head: Michael Aitchison
- Staff: 49 teachers
- Gender: Coeducational
- Age: 11 to 18
- Enrolment: 724
- Houses: Kishorn - Blue; Laggan - Red; Shiel - Green; Torridon - Purple
- Colour: Blue White Black
- Website: www.charlestonacademy.co.uk

Charleston Academy (Gaelic:Àrd Sgoil Bhaile Theàrlaich) is a secondary school established in 1978, in the Kinmylies area of Inverness, Scotland. The present roll is 724 pupils. The catchment area includes Kinmylies, Muirtown, Leachkin and Clachnaharry in the west of Inverness, as well as the rural communities of Beauly, Kirkhill, Kiltarlity, Struy, Abriachan and Dochgarroch.

== About ==
Charleston Academy opened in August 1978 on a new site to the west of Inverness. The school is part of the Charleston Academy Community Campus which consists of the school, its associated Community Centre and the Highland Football Academy. As a former School of Ambition, extensive improvements to Physical Education provision have been made in recent years. The school has two Multi Use Games Areas (MUGA) and an all-weather, floodlit astroturf pitch. Since 2012 the school has been a SFA accredited School of Football. In 2015 the Albert Roux Training Kitchen was officially opened within the school. This industrial, catering quality kitchen had been developed within the Home Economics department and was used to provide vocational courses aligned to careers in the hospitality industry. Since 2010, Chez Albert Roux OBE has worked with the schools' Rector and Home Economics department to establish such a facility in Inverness. The facility was named in his honour. However, the facility was closed in 2022. The school also has a history of asbestos infections. June 2023 saw the school shutting a week before the summer holidays due to a red mite infestation.

== Academic results ==
SQA Exam results at Charleston Academy were described as "very good" in 2015. In 2014 some of the best results ever were obtained by its students. 55 pupils achieved three or more Highers (39.6% of the total) – the highest ever for the current Highers at Charleston Academy and significantly higher than the Scottish average. 21 pupils achieved five Highers at Grades A to C. 6 pupils received outstanding results, achieving five Highers at Grade A.

== Partnerships ==
In 2014 the school partnered with the Wood Family Trust to offer the Youth Philanthropy Initiative as part of the core RMPS course. The schools' British Council International School Partnership with Lotsane Senior Secondary School in Botswana continues to develop. This involves reciprocal teacher exchanges as well as pupil exchanges.

== Rectors ==
- Ronald Lyall 1978-1991
- Tony McCulloch 1991-2003
- Calum McSween 2003-2009
- Chris O'Neill 2010–2018
- Gordon Stewart 2018–2021
- Andrew Brown 2022–2023
- Michael Aitchison 2023 Onwards

== Notable alumni ==
- John Barr, shinty player
- Karen Gillan, actress
- Duncan Chisolm, musician
