= The Aird =

Geographic region of Scotland

Coordinates: 57.45°N 4.40°W

Approximate boundaries of the historical area of the Aird

The Aird (from Scottish Gaelic An Àird, "the high place") is a district of Inverness-shire lying on the south side of the Beauly Firth, between the rivers Beauly and Ness. It includes the villages of Kirkhill, Kiltarlity, Lentran and Inchmore.

The Aird is the traditional heart of the Clan Fraser of Lovat's territory, containing their family seat of Beaufort Castle. The first known Lord of the Aird, however, was Iain Mac Eoin Nan Gleann or "John Bisset of the Glens" in English.

The area gives its name to a Highland Council ward, Aird and Loch Ness.

== History ==
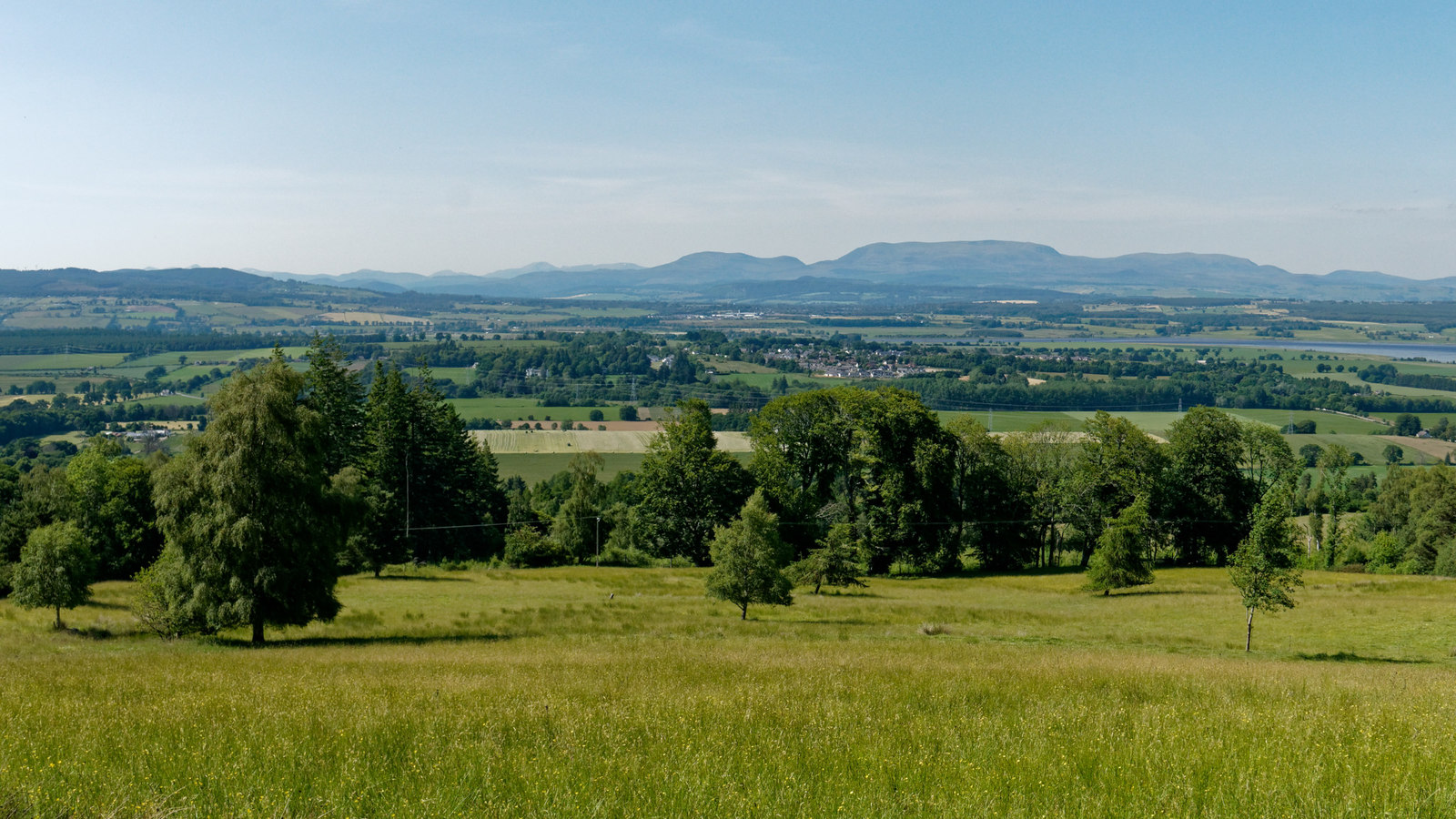
View over the Aird

Blar Nam Feinne (grid reference NH595433) is a site on Cnoc na Moine that reputedly saw a battle in the early 11th century between King Malcolm and Thorfinn of Norway.

The Aird is first documented as a provincial lordship between 1203 and 1221. It only survived as a single territory until 1259, when it was divided among the three female heirs of John Bissett of Lovat and their husbands.

The extent of the lordship is uncertain. It can be shown to have included the parishes of Convinth, Farnua, Kiltarlity, and Dunballoch, which all lay within the Province of Moray, and may also have included the parish of Glenelg on the west coast. Uniquely among Moravian lordships it may also have included land outside the province, including Edirdovar (now Redcastle) on the Black Isle, and land within the parish of Kilmorack, both of which lay within the Province of Ross.

The Aird is also supposed to be the site of the defeat of Donald Balloch in the 15th century. Various cairns marked the burials from the battles, about 20 mounds have survived forestry operations with varying degrees of mutilation.

== Bibliography ==
- Ross, Alasdair (2015). Land Assessment and Lordship in Medieval Northern Scotland. Turnhout: Brepols. ISBN 978-2503541334.

== See also ==
- Beauly, The Aird and Strathglass Place-Name Survey
- A Vision of Britain through Time
