= Lentran railway station =

Disused railway station in Highland, Scotland

Lentran
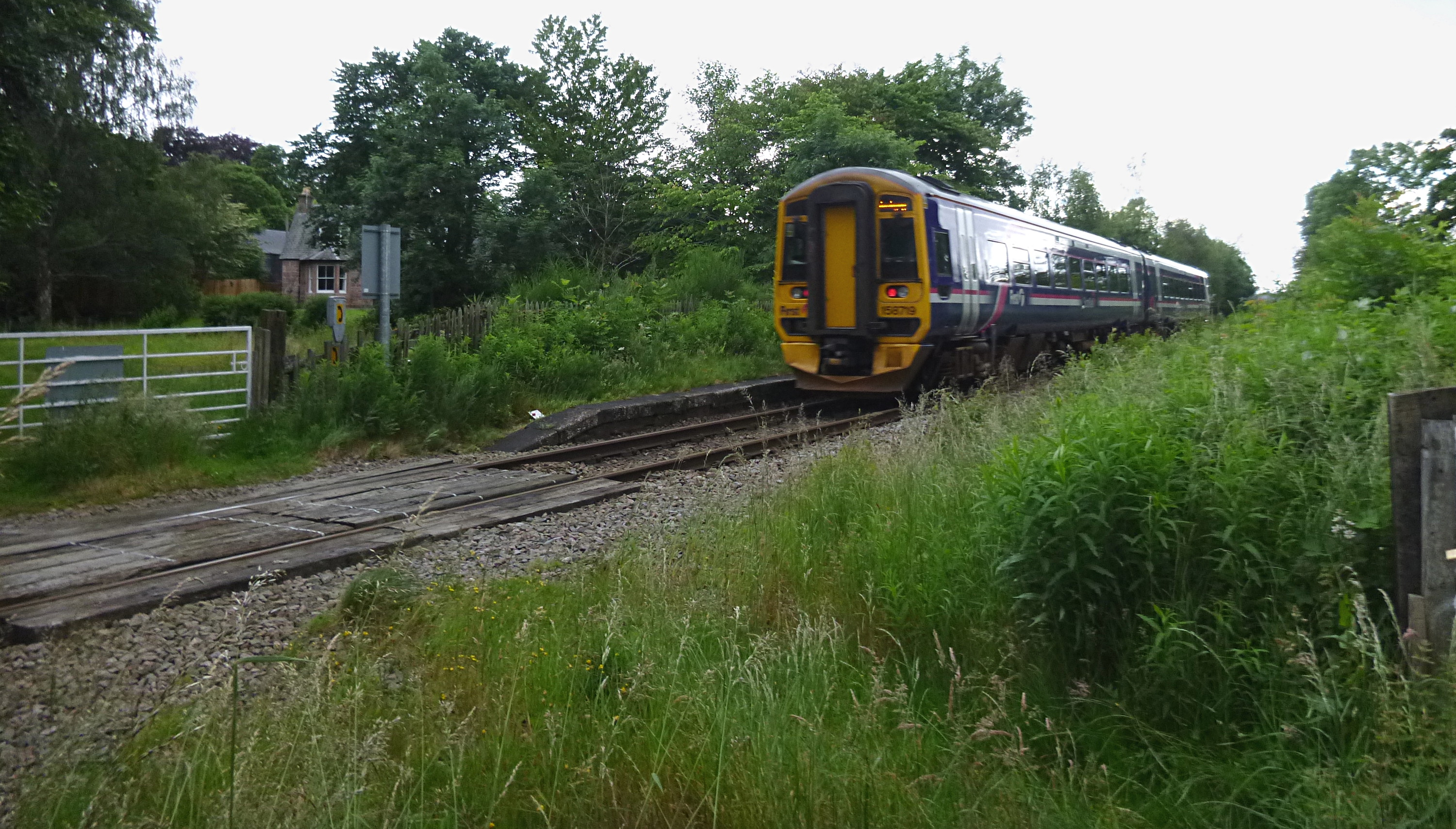
- Station site in 2012

General information
- Location: Lentran, Highland; Scotland
- Coordinates: 57.4803°N 4.3626°W
- Grid reference: NH584458
- Platforms: 2

Other information
- Status: Disused

History
- Original company: Inverness and Ross-shire Railway
- Pre-grouping: Highland Railway
- Post-grouping: London, Midland and Scottish Railway

Key dates
- 11 June 1862: Station opens
- 13 June 1960: closed
- 27 March 1982: reopened temporarily
- 29 March 1982: Station closes
Location

Lentran railway station was a railway station serving Lentran on the Inverness and Ross-shire Railway, on the Inverness to Muir of Ord section opened in 1862.

The line became part of the Highland Railway on 1 February 1865, then, at grouping in 1923, it became part of the London Midland and Scottish Railway.

Initially it had two platforms on an extended loop and there was a small single siding with a loading bay. From 1, June 1914 the section between Clachnaharry and Clunes, which included Lentran, was doubled and was the only such track north of Inverness.

There was a small timber-clad station building with a shelter and a small fifteen lever signal cabin

The station closed in 1960 though the line is still in use as a single track controlled by Radio Electronic Token Block as part of the Far North Line. However, for one weekend in March 1982, Lentran had to reopen and serve as the line terminus while repair work was carried out on the canal bridge at Clachnaharry.

Preceding station	Historical railways	Following station
Bunchrew; Line open; Station closed	Highland Railway; Inverness and Ross-shire Railway	Clunes; Line open; Station closed
