= Abriachan =

Coordinates: 57.3847°N 4.4012°W

Abriachan: Scottish Gaelic: Obar Itheachan
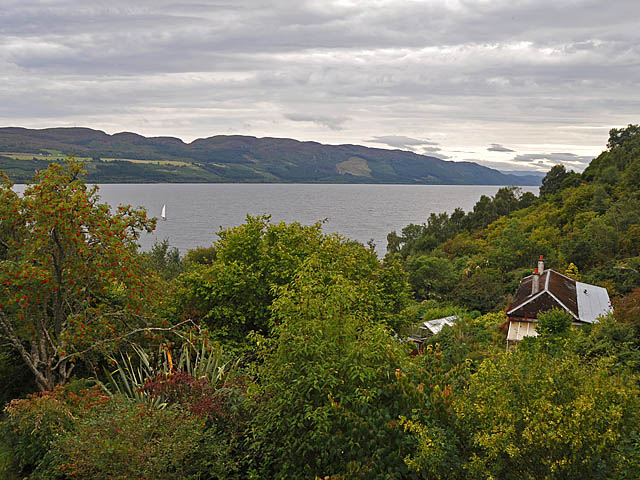

- Location within the Inverness area
- OS grid reference: NH557352
- Council area: Highland
- Lieutenancy area: Inverness
- Country: Scotland
- Sovereign state: United Kingdom
- Post town: Inverness
- Postcode district: IV3
- Dialling code: 01463
- Police: Scotland
- Fire: Scottish
- Ambulance: Scottish
- UK Parliament: Inverness, Skye and West Ross-shire
- Scottish Parliament: Skye, Lochaber and Badenoch

Abriachan (/əˈbriːəxən/; Gaelic: Obar Itheachan), is a village in the Highland council area of Scotland. It is situated high above the western shore of Loch Ness, 15 km to the south-west of the city of Inverness. The village has a population of approximately 120. There are no schools in Abriachan, so children travel by bus into Inverness or to Dochgarroch or Tomnacross for their education.

== GPost office ==
Abriachan post office opened on 25 July 1882, and for many years from the early 1960s was run by Katharine Stewart and her family. An account of life in the Highlands, and of its postal services, was published in 1997. The post office closed on 8 April 2008.

== Abriachan Forest ==
Abriachan Forest is an upland area of conifer forest and open hillside, covering 536 hectares, It was owned by the Forestry Commission until 1998, when it was sold to Abriachan Forest Trust for £152,000. Abriachan Forest Trust is a community group formed to buy and manage the forest, and they are working to encourage recreational and educational use of the forest. They have developed a number of paths and mountain bike trails around the area, including the Great Glen Way long-distance path passing through.

== Notable residents ==
- John Somerville, accordion player with Croft No. Five and Box Club
- Katharine Stewart, author of A Croft in the Hills
- John Barr, international shinty player

== See also ==
- Aber and Inver as place-name elements
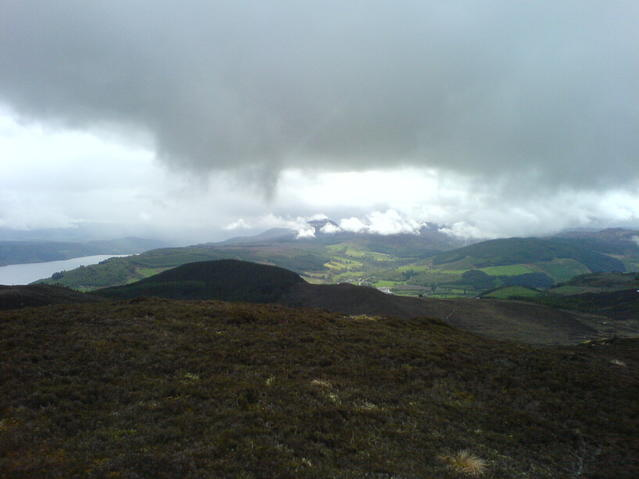
View down Loch Ness on the way to the summit of Meall Na H'Eilrig

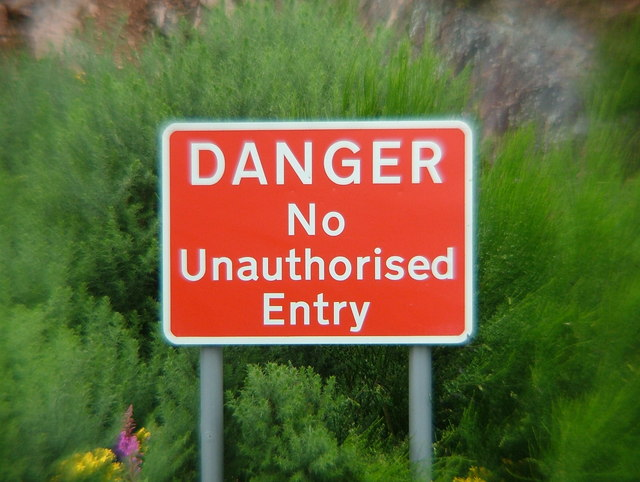
Sign at Loch Ness
