= Cabrich =

Community in Scotland

Coordinates: 57.45°N 04.45°W

Cabrich: Scottish Gaelic: Cabarach
- Location within the Inverness area
- Population: 86
- OS grid reference: NH5343
- Council area: Highland
- Country: Scotland
- Sovereign state: United Kingdom
- Post town: Inverness
- Postcode district: IV5 7
- Dialling code: 01463
- Police: Scotland
- Fire: Scottish
- Ambulance: Scottish
- UK Parliament: Caithness, Sutherland and Easter Ross
- Scottish Parliament: Skye, Lochaber and Badenoch

Cabrich (Scottish Gaelic: Cabarach, meaning "Place of Tree-trunks") is a scattered crofting community in the Highland council area of Scotland. It is 1.5 miles (2.4 km) northeast of the village of Kiltarlity, and around 11 miles (17 km) west of Inverness.

Situated on a gently sloping hill, Cabrich is roughly a mile square and is a popular site for cyclists, runners, and wild-campers. It has a wide variety of wildlife including deer, rabbits, and a large amount of pheasants. Many of its fields are used for sheep-farming.

The community is along the John O'Groats Trail. The area is described in the Aird local walking guide as "a peaceful valley", with no special footwear required.

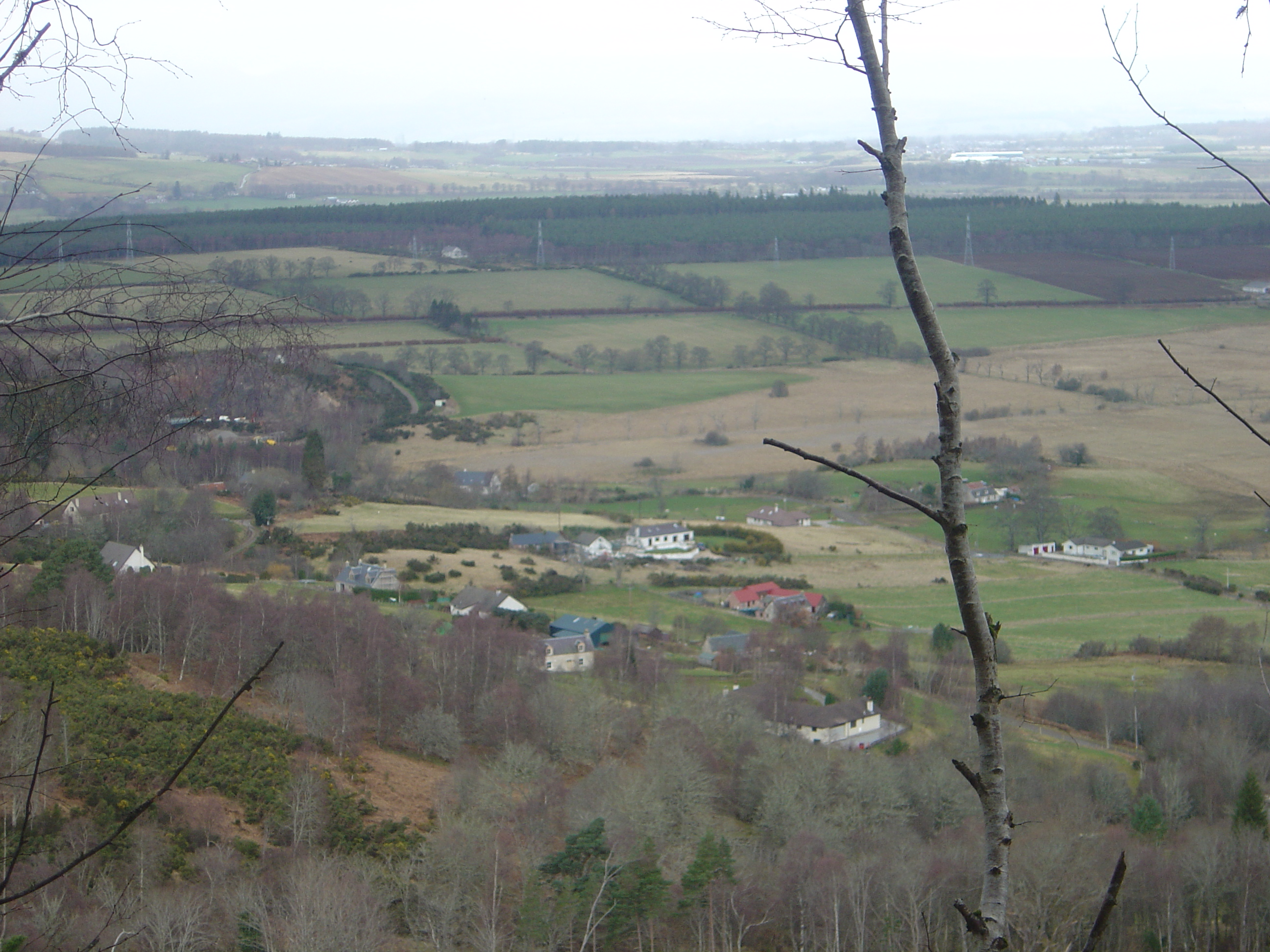
View of Cabrich from its surrounding hills

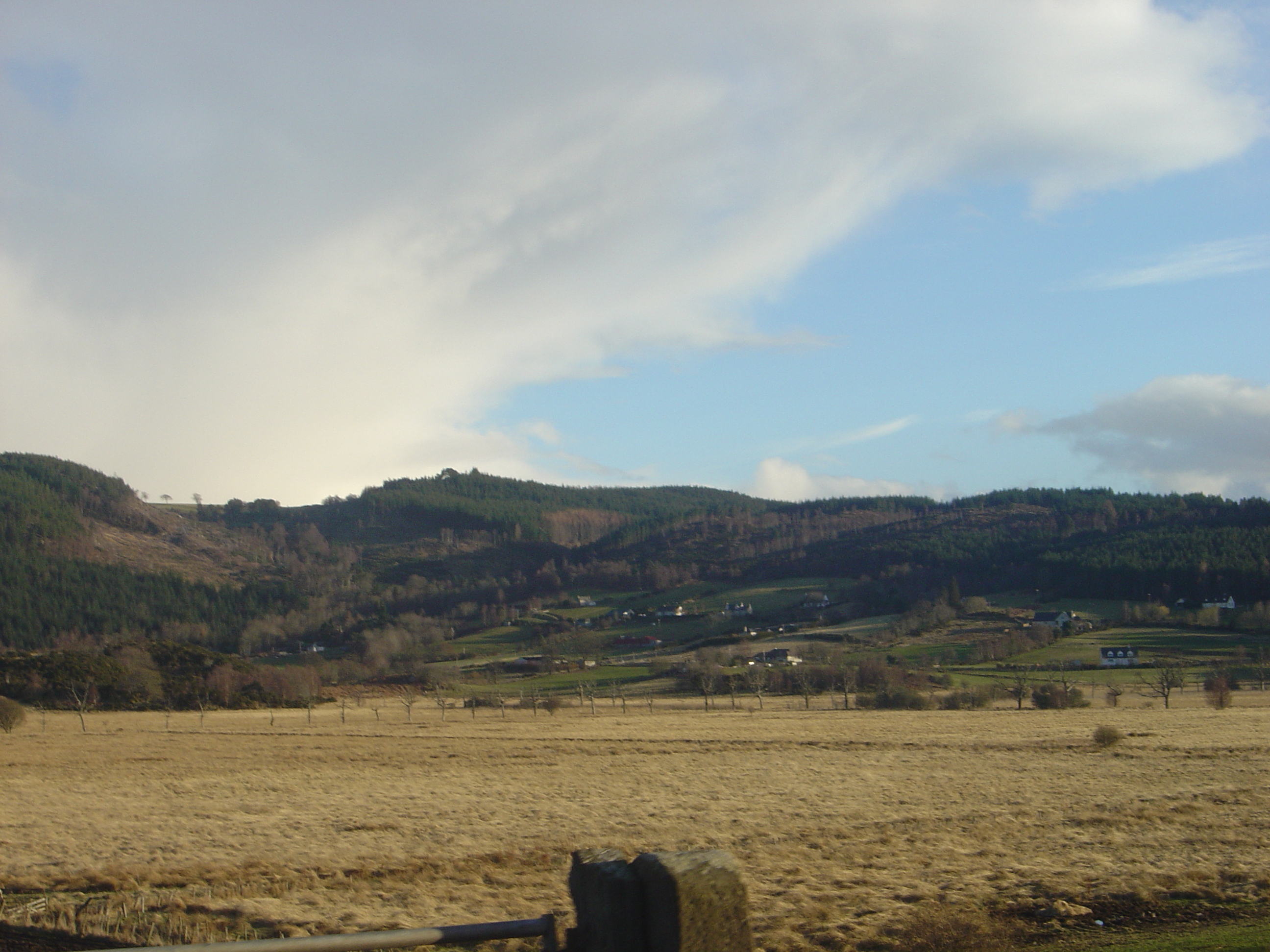
View of Cabrich from the A862
