= Clunes railway station =

Clunes railway station may refer to:

- Clunes railway station (Scotland)
- Clunes railway station, Victoria, Australia
