= Belladrum, Scotland =

Coordinates: 57.443191°N 4.463454°W

Belladrum: Scottish Gaelic: Baile an Druim
- Location within the Inverness area
- OS grid reference: NH5237242096
- Council area: Highland
- Country: Scotland
- Sovereign state: United Kingdom
- Post town: Beauly
- Postcode district: IV4 7
- Police: Scotland
- Fire: Scottish
- Ambulance: Scottish
- UK Parliament: Caithness, Sutherland and Easter Ross
- Scottish Parliament: Skye, Lochaber and Badenoch

Belladrum (Scottish Gaelic: Baile an Druim, meaning "Farm of the Ridge") is a small settlement in the Highland council area of Scotland. It is about 0.9 miles (1.4 km) east of the village of Kiltarlity, and 9 miles (14.5 km west) of Inverness. Belladrum is synonymous with the Belladrum Estate, a large area of land once owned by Clan Fraser of Lovat, before being sold to the Gibbs' family in 1857.

In the early 16th century, Belladrum was one of two davochs of Moy, under rulership of the Barony of the Aird. It was confirmed by King James IV to the Haliburton family (an offshoot of Clan Chisholm) in the year 1512

Nowadays, Belladrum is better-known for its Tartan Heart Festival, a rapidly-growing music and arts festival that has in recent years seen acts like Tom Jones, Jess Glynne, and Lewis Capaldi. The Belladrum Estate is also a popular site for weddings, held within an octagonal "temple" on the estate grounds.

Outside of the festival, Belladrum is chiefly concerned with sheep farming and forestry. Belladrum Forest is a popular destination for both bikers and walkers, climbing to a radio mast atop Phoineas Hill. The hill was the site of an ancient Pictish fort, though its remains are no longer visible. There is also a pony club located on the estate.

In 2016, the Belladrum Estate registered its own tartan with the Scottish Register of Tartans, said to represent the estate's "ancient green forests and native lichens ... coupled with a contrasting russet red, a colour that signifies the passion and pride many generations have had for the Belladrum Estate."

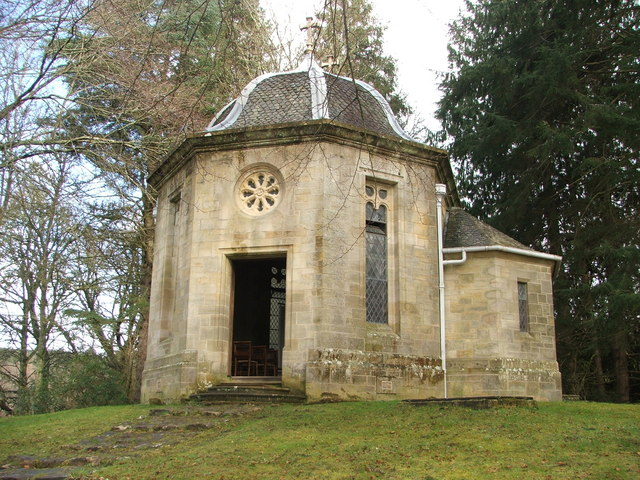
Belladrum Chapel (or "Temple"), a popular site for local weddings

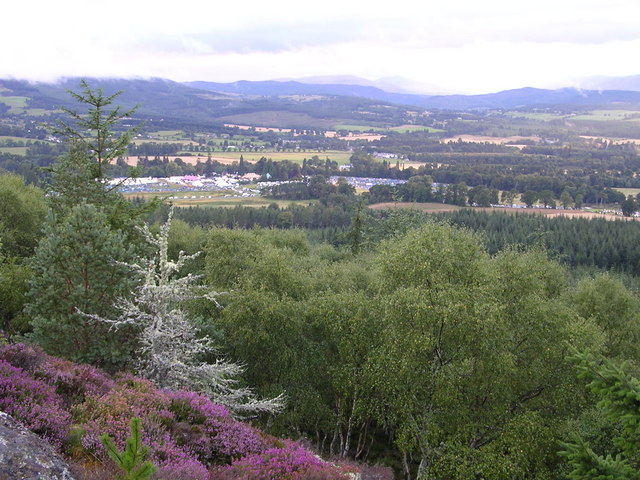
Summit of Phoineas Hill, located within Belladrum Forest 170m above sea level

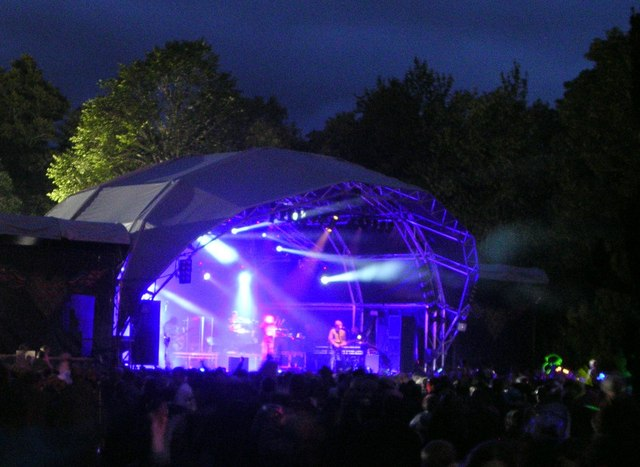
The Garden Stage at the Belladrum Tartan Heart Festival
