= Glaichbea =

Coordinates: 57.425°N 4.477°W

- Location within the Inverness area
- OS grid reference: NH507405
- Council area: Highland
- Country: Scotland
- Sovereign state: United Kingdom
- Post town: Beauly
- Postcode district: IV4 7
- Police: Scotland
- Fire: Scottish
- Ambulance: Scottish

Glaichbea is a small hamlet in the Highland council area, located directly south of Camault Muir in the Highlands of Scotland. It is located 3.8 miles (6.1 km) south-southwest of Beauly and 14.1 miles (22.7 km) southwest of Inverness. It is part of the civil parish of Kiltarlity and Convinth, and the lieutenancy area and historic county of Inverness-shire.

== History ==
There are a number of archaeological features in the area that were discovered in April 2005, including buildings associated with a probable post-medieval farmstead as well as a number of clearance cairns.
