= Blar Nam Feinne =

Medieval battlefield

Coordinates: 57.458°N 4.343°W

Blàr nam Fèinne (Battlefield of the Fingalians) on Cnoc na Moine (/ˌnɒknəˈmɔɪnjə/, Hill of the Peat) in The Aird, to the west of Inverness, is the site of the 11th century battle between Scottish forces led by Malcolm III of Scotland and Norwegian forces led by Thorfinn the Mighty.

The site is also traditionally believed to be the location at which Domhnall Ballach, leader of Clan Donald, and his forces were defeated in the 15th century.
