= Clachnaharry =

Human settlement in Highland, Scotland, UK

Clachnaharry Clach na h-Aithrigh
- Village
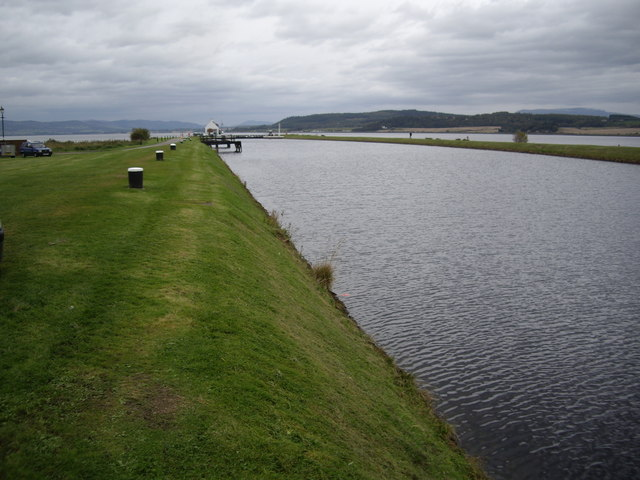
- View along the canal to the sea lock
- Interactive map of Clachnaharry
- Coordinates: 57°29′18″N 4°15′35″W
- Country: Scotland
- Council area: Highland
- City: Inverness

Clachnaharry (/ˌklæxnəˈhæri/; Scottish Gaelic: Clach na h-Aithrigh) is a former fishing village, now part of the city of Inverness in the Highland council area of Scotland. Clachnaharry is situated on the south shore of the Beauly Firth, about 2 miles (3 km) west of the city centre.

The village was often wrongly said to have derived its name from the Gaelic Clach na Faire, 'watchman's stone' which refers to nearby rocks used as a look out post by the townsfolk of Inverness. The recent book "The Gaelic Place Names and Heritage of Inverness" by Roddy Maclean, however, has pointed out the name in fact derives from Clach na h-Aithrigh, Stone of Repentance.

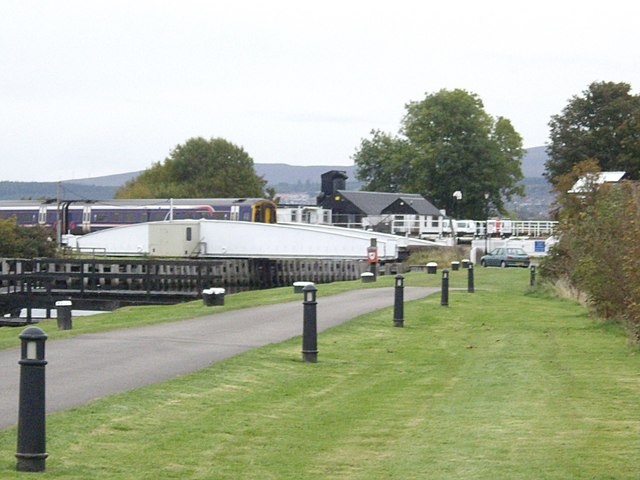
Railway swing bridge over the canal

The Caledonian Canal begins at Clachnaharry, connecting to the Beauly Firth via a sea lock. The Far North Line also passes through, crossing the canal on a swing bridge. Clachnaharry used to have a railway station. This station opened in 1869 on the Inverness and Ross-shire Railway, and was the first stop after leaving Inverness, but closed in 1913.

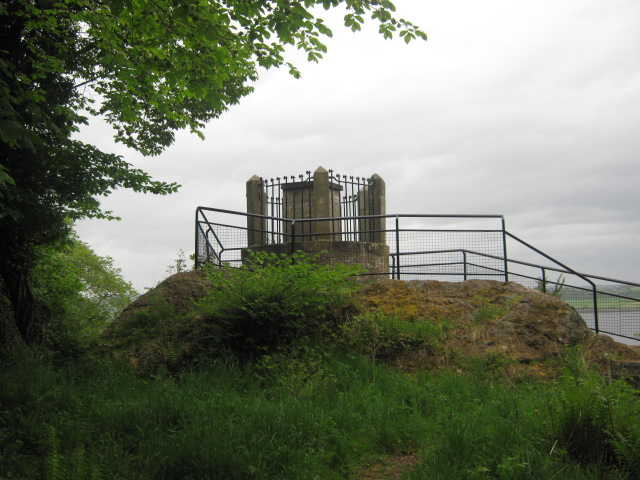
Monument for the Battle of Clachnaharry

A monument here commemorates the Battle of Clachnaharry between the Clan Munro and the Clan Chattan in 1454.
