= Tomnacross =

Coordinates: 57.43772°N 4.48008°W

Tomnacross: Scottish Gaelic: Tom na Croiche
- Location within the Inverness area
- OS grid reference: NH512413
- Council area: Highland
- Country: Scotland
- Sovereign state: United Kingdom
- Post town: Beauly
- Postcode district: IV4
- Police: Scotland
- Fire: Scottish
- Ambulance: Scottish

Tomnacross is a small hamlet and makes up the south eastern corner of the village of Kiltarlity, and is situated about 20km west of the city of Inverness in the Highland Council area of Scotland. It is the location of the Kiltarlity village school (Tomnacross Primary), Kiltarlity Church, and its adjoining cemetery. There are also several houses in the area. The Tartan Heart Festival takes place nearby on the Belladrum Estate.

The name "Tomnacross" is a 19th-century anglicisation of "tom na croiche", Scottish Gaelic for "knowe of the gallows". This refers to the gallows which were on a stepped hill in the churchyard.

For most of its history, Tomnacross has been little more than a few crofts above the village of Kiltarlity. In 1766 however, the area's ecclesiastical establishment (i.e. manse, glebe, and church) moved from just south of the River Beauly to what is the present-day kirk. However, with the main village expanding, and new houses being built around the school, the area is considered to be an area of Kiltarlity itself as opposed to its own dedicated area.

Tomnacross Primary School was built in 1875, though has been extended several times over the years. Originally also a secondary school, it became solely a primary school in about 1970. The current school roll is 90, plus 28 in the nursery. The school is within the catchment area of Charleston Academy in the Kinmylies area of Inverness.

Kiltarlity Church is part of the Church of Scotland. The modern church was built in 1829, on the site of a previous incarnation built the century before, and is a Category B listed building.

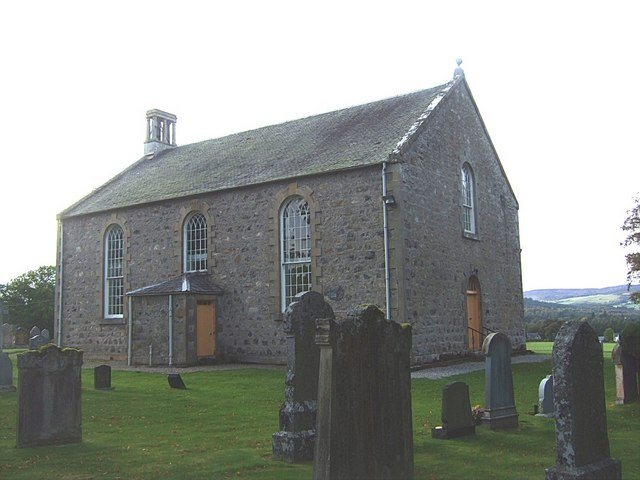
Kiltarlity Church, at the centre of Tomnacross

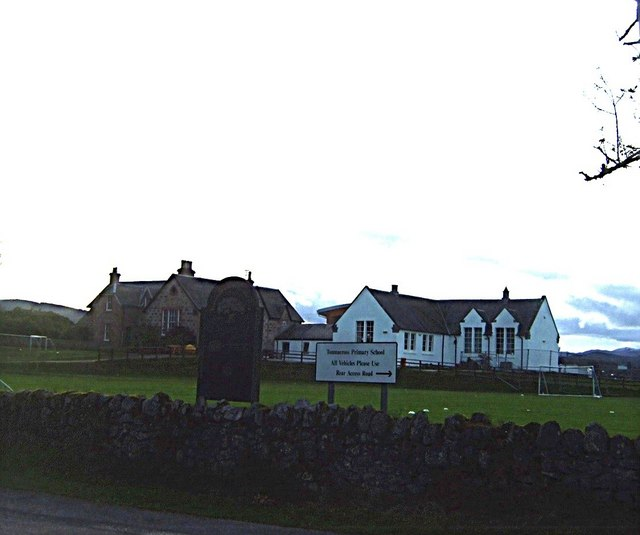
Tomnacross Primary School
