= Ardendrain =

Coordinates: 57.411°N 4.480°W

Ardendrain: Scottish Gaelic: Àirde an Droigheann
- Location within the Inverness area
- OS grid reference: NH510381
- Council area: Highland
- Country: Scotland
- Sovereign state: United Kingdom
- Police: Scotland
- Fire: Scottish
- Ambulance: Scottish
- UK Parliament: Caithness, Sutherland and Easter Ross
- Scottish Parliament: Skye, Lochaber and Badenoch

Ardendrain (Scottish Gaelic: Àirde an Droigheann, meaning "Height of the Blackthorn) is a scattered hamlet in the Highland council area of Scotland. It is 2.5 miles (4 km) south of the village of Kiltarlity, and 11 miles (18 km) west of Inverness.

The hamlet is spread over the grassy fields of Glen Convinth, with both the A833 and Belladrum Burn running directly through it. Kiltarlity Lodges, a group of four-star, self-catering cabins, is located within the hamlet.

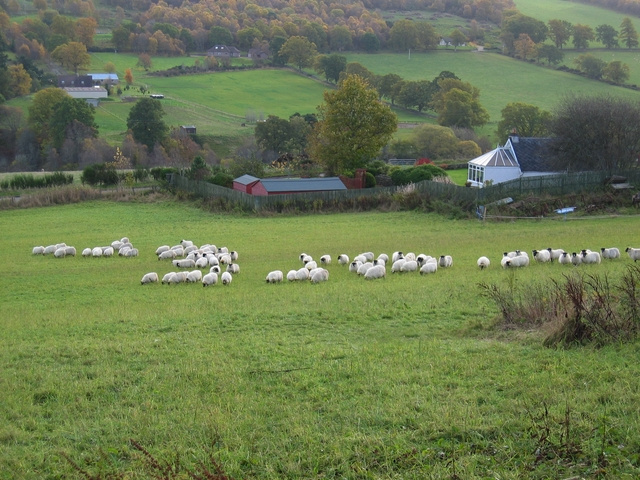
Sheep grazing by Ardendrain
