= John Barr (shinty) =

Scotland international shinty and club rugby union player

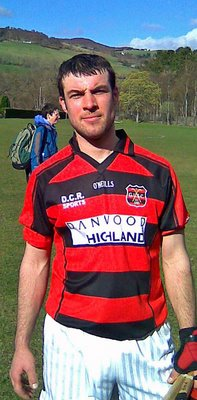
- Born: 1982 (age 43–44); Inverness, Scottish Highlands
- Occupation: Shinty Player
- Known for: Shinty

John Barr (born 1982) is a Scottish international shinty player from Abriachan, Scotland. He has mainly played as a defender, for Glenurquhart Shinty Club where he has also been assistant manager.

== Early life and education ==
Barr attended Charleston Academy in Inverness. He attended Robert Gordon University and graduated in 2009.

== Shinty career ==
Barr has represented Scotland at all levels of shinty, most recently in 2009.

He is known for a physically dominant style of play. The crowd at the 2009 Scotland-Ireland international enjoyed the good humoured chant "John Barr ate my car".

In 2006, he was part of the Scottish University Shinty Men's squad and having performed so well as a hurler, he received a Universities Hurling All Star honour in recognition of this.

=== International shinty ===
His first senior cap was in 2005 and in October 2015 he gained his fourteenth cap as captain of Scotland against Ireland in the first leg of the cross-code Shinty-Hurling at Bight Park in Inverness. Scotland won the tie.

Barr has acted as a Trustee on the Board of RGU union since 2014.
