= Kiltarlity =

Village near Inverness, Scotland

Coordinates: 57.4391°N 4.4923°W

Kiltarlity: Scottish Gaelic: Cill Targhlain
- Village
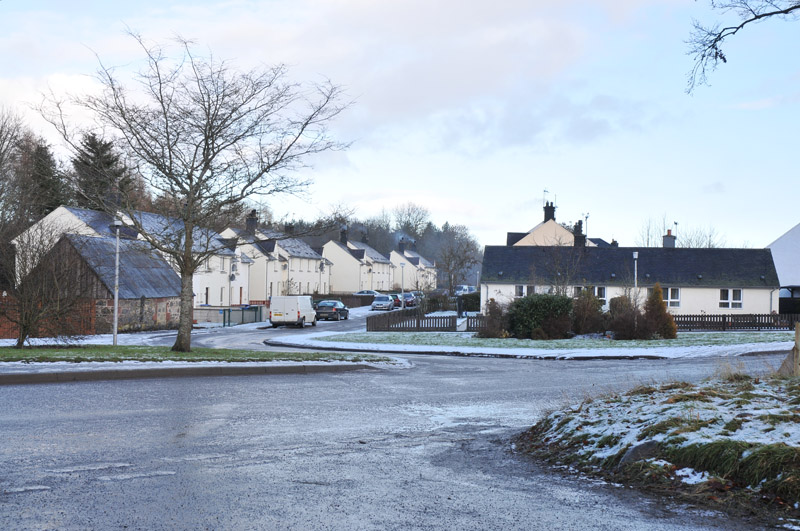

- Location within the Inverness area
- Population: 1,000
- OS grid reference: NH50504150
- Council area: Highland
- Country: Scotland
- Sovereign state: United Kingdom
- Post town: Beauly
- Postcode district: IV4 7
- Police: Scotland
- Fire: Scottish
- Ambulance: Scottish
- UK Parliament: Caithness, Sutherland and Easter Ross
- Scottish Parliament: Skye, Lochaber and Badenoch

Kiltarlity (Scottish Gaelic: Cill Targhlain) is a small village in the Highland council area of Scotland. It is 12 miles (19 km) west of Inverness and 2 1/2 miles (4 kilometres) south of Beauly, on the south bank of the Bruiach Burn. It has a population of under 1,000 people, and a local primary school, Tomnacross Primary. Lovat Shinty Club play at Kiltarlity, on a pitch beside the village's main street, Balgate Drive.

Kiltarlity has a village store, a post office, and a village hall. Close to the village are Lovat Castle, the historic seat of Clan Fraser of Lovat, and the Belladrum Estate, site of the Tartan Heart Festival.

Kiltarlity also has a community council, which holds regular meetings in the village hall and publishes a triannual newsletter.

Nearby hamlets considered to be part of Kiltarlity include Camault Muir, Tomnacross, Ardendrain, Glaichbea, Belladrum and Culburnie.

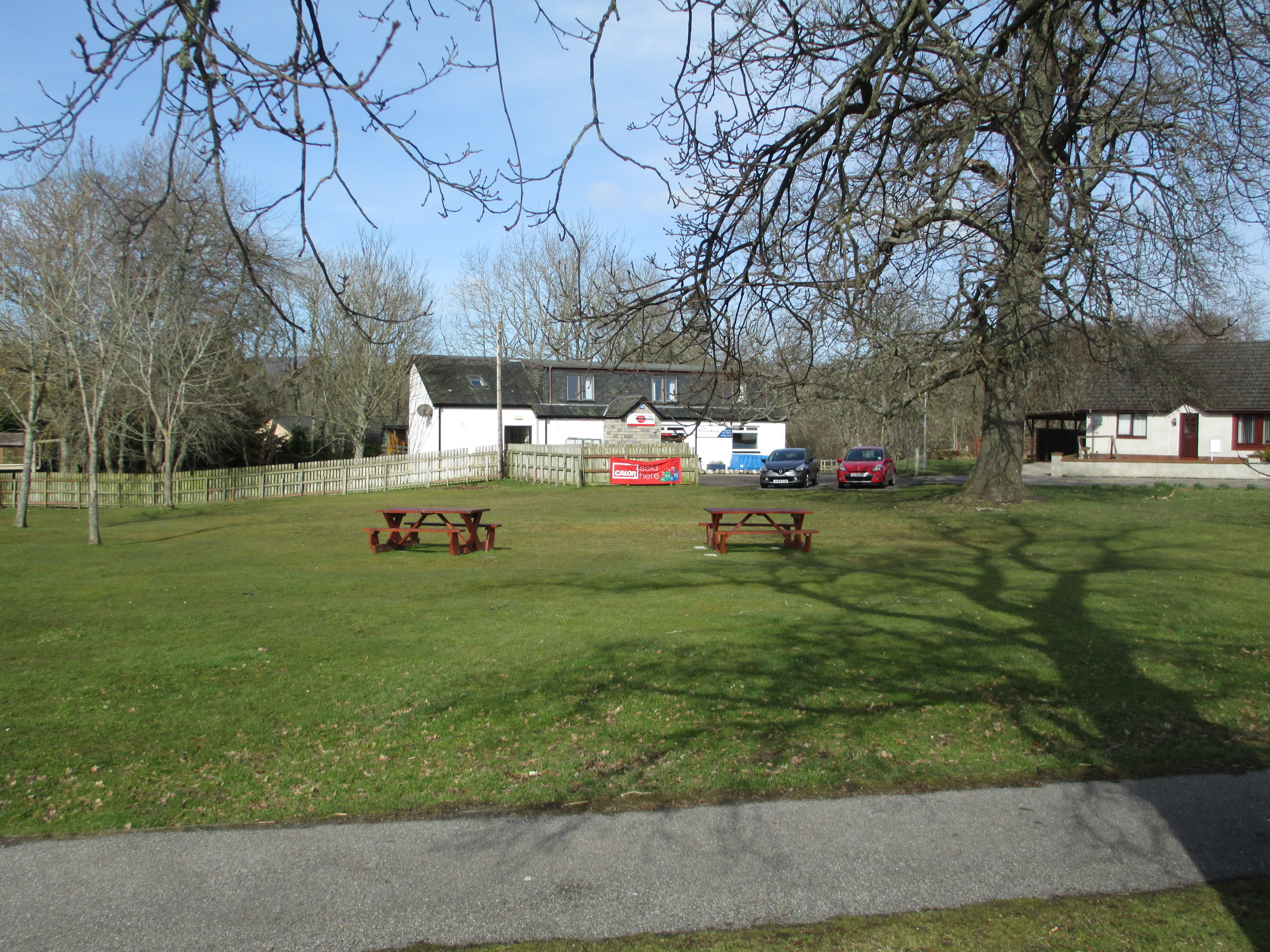
Kiltarlity village green, with post office in centre

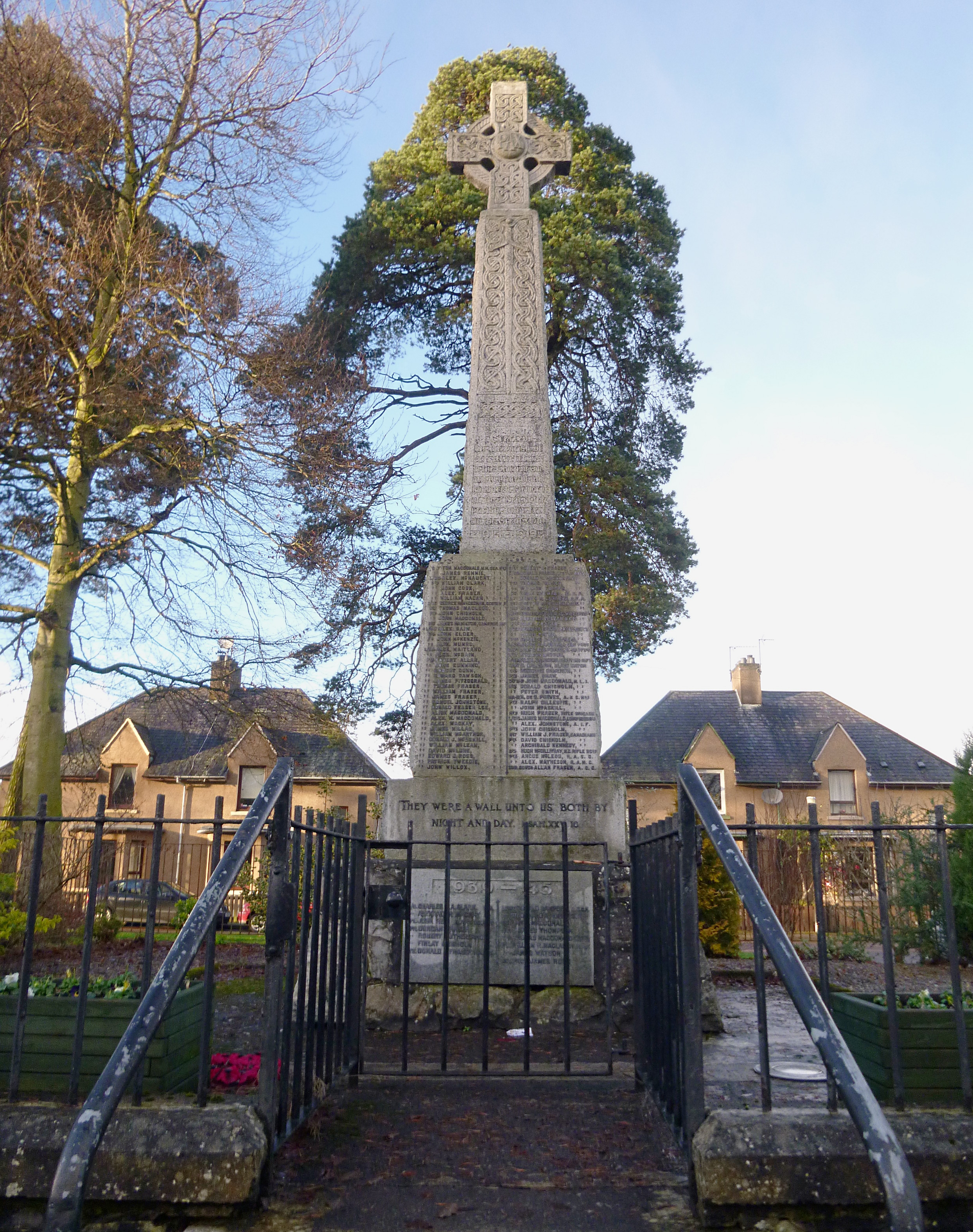
The village war memorial, awarded 'Best Kept War Memorial in Scotland' in August 2018

== History ==
=== 17th century ===
==== Condition of the Kirk ====
Documents from the 17th century that mention the parish of Kiltarlity focused mainly on its church. Since the Reformation, both the Episcopalian and Presbyterian churches had been slow in converting the Scottish Highlands to Protestantism, due to a lack of necessary infrastructure there and an inability to communicate with Gaelic-speaking Highlanders.

Visiting the Highlands in the early-1680s, Irish Catholic priest John Cahassy claimed Highlanders were Protestant by name only, and "rather infidels than of any sect".

A major problem facing the Kirk was a lack of "ecclesiastical provision", with many Highland parishes lacking even a manse for their minister. Kiltarlity was one such parish in the 17th century, along with neighbouring Wardlaw and Daviot.

The payment of ministers was also very unreliable, usually due to locals refusing to pay their tithes. William Fraser, Church of Scotland minister for Kiltarlity from 1618 to 1665, died with over L. 888 in unpaid stipends.

Nonetheless, the Kirk was able to construct a new church in 1626 on the south bank of the River Beauly. This was in use until 1766, when the "manse, glebe and church" were transferred to their current site at Tomnacross. The ruins of the former church can still be seen today.

A further problem facing the Presbyterian church in the Highlands was poor ministerial discipline, with many ministers failing to carry out the bare minimum of their duties, committing crimes, or holding illegal marriages. Hugh Fraser, minister for Kiltarlity after William, was accused by the Church of Scotland in 1676 of marrying delinquents "without any testificat". In 1674 he had undergone a "mock marriage" to an unknown 'Bessie Gray', celebrated by his friend and minister for Daviot, Michael Fraser. The pair were later rebuked by the Kirk for not being "sober ministers".

By the late-17th century, Kiltarlity's Catholic population largely resided in Strathglass, where they would remain for the next two centuries. Despite presenting "a stubborn challenge to the established Church", their community was weak, few in number, and scattered.

=== 18th century ===
==== Geography and demographics ====
In 1794 the parish of Kiltarlity was one of the larger Highland parishes, comprising 180 square miles (470 square kilometres). Despite this, only "a 30th part" of its land was arable, due to the landscape being largely mountainous.

Like other large and mountainous parishes in the Scottish Highlands, Kiltarlity in the 18th century would have had a scattered population and few navigable roads. This would mean poor church attendance and thus very low literacy rates, as the Kirk was the primary educator in the Highlands at the time.

Over ⅓ of the parish's adult male population in 1794 were cottars, a further ¼ "small tenants", and at least 60 crofters on the nigh inhospitable, upland moors. This signifies the land dispossession that would grow into the Highland Clearances had already begun around Kiltarlity prior to 1794.

Most of Kiltarlity's native population was still Scottish Gaelic-speaking in the late-18th century, with many monoglots in the parish's remoter areas. Only those nearest to the village kirk in the parish's low-lying east could "transact ordinary business in English"—though bilingual parishioners retained “a strong predilection for their mother tongue".

==== Socioeconomic change ====
In the late-18th century, emigration of Kiltarlity's population throughout the British Empire accelerated. Many men went south to the rapidly industrialising Central Belt of Scotland, or further still to England. Others went as far as the West Indies, perhaps linked to one of the village's landholders, Major Fraser of Belladrum, who held several plantations there.

Industrialisation itself appeared in Kiltarlity during this time in the form of a new sawmill constructed on the River Beauly, which formed the parish's northern border. Hydro-powered, using a "strong artificial dam", the mill transformed Scots' pines felled 30 miles (50 kilometres) upriver into timber bound for "Leith or London".

New species and technology were also introduced to the parish in the late-18th century, including larch for timber purposes and the modern cast-iron plough. At the same time, several native species, including the Scottish wildcat and capercaillie, had been made extinct in the area by 1794 at latest.

By British Governmental statute a new road was being built along the parish's north end, using local indentured labour. According to the local Church of Scotland minister, alcoholism was rife in the parish in the form of whisky, with dozens of homemade and household stills.

=== 19th century ===
==== New aristocracy ====
By the mid-19th century, Kiltarlity's landowning class consisted largely of absentee landlords. The owners of Castle Dounie (seat of Clan Fraser prior to the 1745 rising) and the Belladrum Estate lived in Lowland Aberdeenshire, and were only present in the village "some months in the year".

Lord Lovat constructed the present-day Beaufort Castle in 1880 in the Scottish baronial style. It was built on the site of an older castle, burned down following the Battle of Culloden.

At the same time, several new structures appeared in the parish. The Sobieski Stuarts built a new mansion house on the island of Eilean Aigas in the Beauly River that still stands today. The Church of Scotland parish church was built in 1829. The new Lord Lovat also commissioned a Catholic chapel to be built in Strathglass, to the parish's northwest, marking an important shift back towards public tolerance of Catholicism, now that Jacobitism was no longer a political threat.

==== Socioeconomic change ====
Usage of Gaelic declined rapidly over the course of the 19th century, as six new schools (including the first girls school) in the parish spread English literacy, and the Highlands' economy grew more interlinked with the British Empire.

Living costs for local tenants rose dramatically in the early-19th century, from a maximum of L. 1 per acre in 1794 to an average of L. 1, 10s. per acre in 1841. At the same time, leases had become too short for tenants to "incur the expense of planting" i.e. improve poor land. Furthermore, Kiltarlity's population increased from 2,495 in 1794 to 2,881 in 1841, likely due to advancements in medicine and changing norms around marriage.

With more tenants competing for less available and lower-quality land, greater English literacy rates, and the onset of the Highland Potato Famine from 1846 to 1856, yet more parishioners would have emigrated during the late-19th century. This is without even considering land clearances in the area, for which there is evidence in a Gaelic poem titled Theid Sinn a dh'America, written c. 1801 by an unknown bard from Strathglass:

“A plague on the landlords,

with their greed for money;

they prefer flocks of sheep

to their own armed hosts.”

(Translated from Gaidhlig)

=== 20th century ===
==== Ecology ====
Kiltarlity's population of feral goats, roaming since the Clearances, had disappeared by 1963. A myxomatosis plague in the early-20th century led to the temporary extinction of wild rabbits in the area. Native species like grouse, deer, and trout continued to flourish.

==== Economic change ====
By the mid-20th century, the crofting way of life in Kiltarlity had largely died out. Largescale industrial farming replaced it, including Lord Lovat's extensive cattle ranches. Mechanisation of agriculture put many young men out of work, whilst centralisation around Inverness led to the closure of the village blacksmith, shoemaker, tailor, and public house. Most Kiltarlity residents now earned their living outside the village, either in Beauly or Inverness.

From the 1910s to 1930s, deer-stalking and salmon-fishing in the parish became a popular tourist attraction for wealthy English and American visitors. This created high profits for Kiltarlity's main landowners. Due to high taxation from the 1940s onwards and poor maintenance of game stock, however, the industry declined rapidly.

==== New lifestyles ====
The popularisation of automobiles in Kiltarlity in the 20th century came at the benefit of service-providers in nearby Beauly and Inverness, but to the detriment of local merchants and shopkeepers. With many new roads for cars and buses, Kiltarlity shifted from a self-sustaining, semi-isolated community to a commuter town for Inverness. This has led to several new housing estates over the decades, continuing today as land around the central village is developed.

With the establishment of the North of Scotland Hydro-Electric Board and construction of hydroelectric dams on the River Beauly in the 1940s and 50s, most homes in Kiltarlity quickly gained electricity. Some houses retained wood and coal fires for heating, while peat-cutting disappeared almost entirely.

By the 1960s, Gaelic had almost completely disappeared from the parish, only present among the oldest generations. Local church services in Gaelic ended in 1940. Nonetheless, "the old Highland custom of warm hospitality persist[ed]"—including cèilidhs and open doors.

After its peak in 1861 of 2,965, Kiltarlity's population consistently decreased, the decline accelerating in the early-20th century due to emigration. Many young men in the village did not come back from WW1 and WW2. By 1961, the population was only 1,184.

=== 21st Century ===
The early 21st century saw the demolition of the former sawmill as well as the closure of Brockies Lodge and the Allarburn Bar, with the Post Office and Convenience Store relocating to the site of the former bar. However, the first two decades saw the opening of the K2000 Aultfearn Walk in 2000, as well as a vast growth in population with the village with 135 new houses being constructed, including a major housing development on the former sawmill site. Despite this rapid growth in size, bus services to the village were controversially, and drastically cut back, and eventually abandoned by Stagecoach, leaving a dangerous two-mile (three-kilometre) walk along the A833 to the nearest stop on the network. Services were eventually picked up by Inverness based D&E Coaches.

== Toponymy ==
The name 'Kiltarlity' is of disputed origin. The Old Statistical Account for the parish of Kiltarlity cites it as deriving from a corruption of the Latin cella, meaning 'the worship place of a saint', and St. Thalargus—a figure of unknown origin.

The New Statistical Account, written 47 years later, offers an alternative explanation for the parish name. It notes the presence of a Clach Tarrail (Gaelic for "Tarrail's stone") one-half mile (800 metres) southwest of the old village kirk. Hence, the author translates "Kiltarlity" as "sepulchre of Tarrail" though again, "Tarrail" remains an unknown figure.

A final explanation from a University of St Andrews study points to the Gaelic translation of Cill Targhlain, meaning 'Church of Talorgan'. This was the name of several historic (and legendary) Pictish kings, with similarly dedicated churches in Aberdeenshire and Skye.

In the past, 'Kiltarlity' referred to the entire parish, known in Scottish Gaelic as Bràigh na h-Àirde ('summit of the high place'). This included a number of surrounding hamlets. The main settlement was known as Aultfearna (Gaelic) or Allarburn (Scots), referring to the alder trees that grow on the banks of the Bruiach Burn, which runs through the village. Nowadays however, this settlement is signposted as Kiltarlity Village, and usually referred to as simply Kiltarlity.

== Transport ==
=== Bus ===
Bus services are operated by D&E Coaches between Kiltarlity and Inverness, running roughly every two hours from Monday to Saturday roughly between 07:00 and 22:00. The nearest stop on the Stagecoach network is at "Brochies Corner", which is a two-mile (three-kilometre) walk from the village, and is not advised to be used to access the village.

=== Rail ===
The nearest railway station to Kiltarlity is situated four miles (six kilometres) away in the village of Beauly, with connecting bus services via Hughton available in the village center. Walking is not advised, as while there is a pavement, it only goes as far as the aforementioned 'Brochies Corner'.

=== Road ===
Kiltarlity is located 12 miles (19 kilometres) south-southwest of Inverness and sits just off the A833 which connects Drumnadrochit to the Former A9 and the North Coast 500 at 'Brochies Corner'. Kiltarlity is also connected to the A831 at Kilmorack by an unlisted single track B Road, which runs off the end of the main road through the village.

== Notable people ==
- John Alexander MacWilliam – pioneer of cardiac electrophysiology
- Danny Kelly – Shinty Player, Lovat and Scotland
