= Camault Muir =

Coordinates: 57.43347°N 4.48213°W

- Location within the Inverness area
- Population: 181
- OS grid reference: NH510408
- Council area: Highland
- Country: Scotland
- Sovereign state: United Kingdom
- Post town: Kiltarlity
- Postcode district: IV4 7
- Police: Scotland
- Fire: Scottish
- Ambulance: Scottish
- UK Parliament: Inverness, Nairn, Badenoch and Strathspey
- Scottish Parliament: Skye, Lochaber and Badenoch

Camault Muir is a scattered crofting community and part of the village of Kiltarlity, in the Highland council area of Scotland. It is situated on a boggy plateau about 0.6 miles (1 km) south of the main part of Kiltarlity, and 10 miles (16 km west) of Inverness. Its name derives from the Scottish Gaelic "cam-allt", meaning "crooked burn"—a reference to the small, winding stream running through it.

Around the Camault Muir circuit is Highland Liliums Garden Centre, a small, family-run business began in 1974. Liliums has its own shop, but also supplies native and alpine plants to other centres around Scotland.

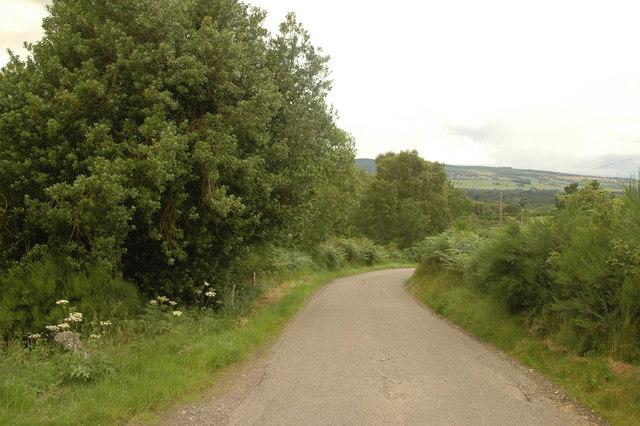
Camault Muir centres around a small ring road, colloquially known as "the Ocean"
