= Katharine Stewart =

Katharine Stewart BEM (29 August 1914 in Reading, England – 27 March 2013 in Inverness) was an English author, crofter, teacher and postmistress.

Stewart is best known for her book A Croft in the Hills. First published in 1960, it describes the life of a family in a remote croft in the 1950s. The book has been republished and reprinted seven times. She also wrote A Garden In The Hills, Crofts and Crofting, A School In The Hills, The Post in the Hills and The Crofting Way.

== Awards ==
She was awarded:

- The British Empire Medal for services to the community.
- A Saltire Society Award for her contribution to the understanding of Scottish Highland culture.
