= Clachnaharry railway station =

Disused railway station in Highland, Scotland

Clachnaharry
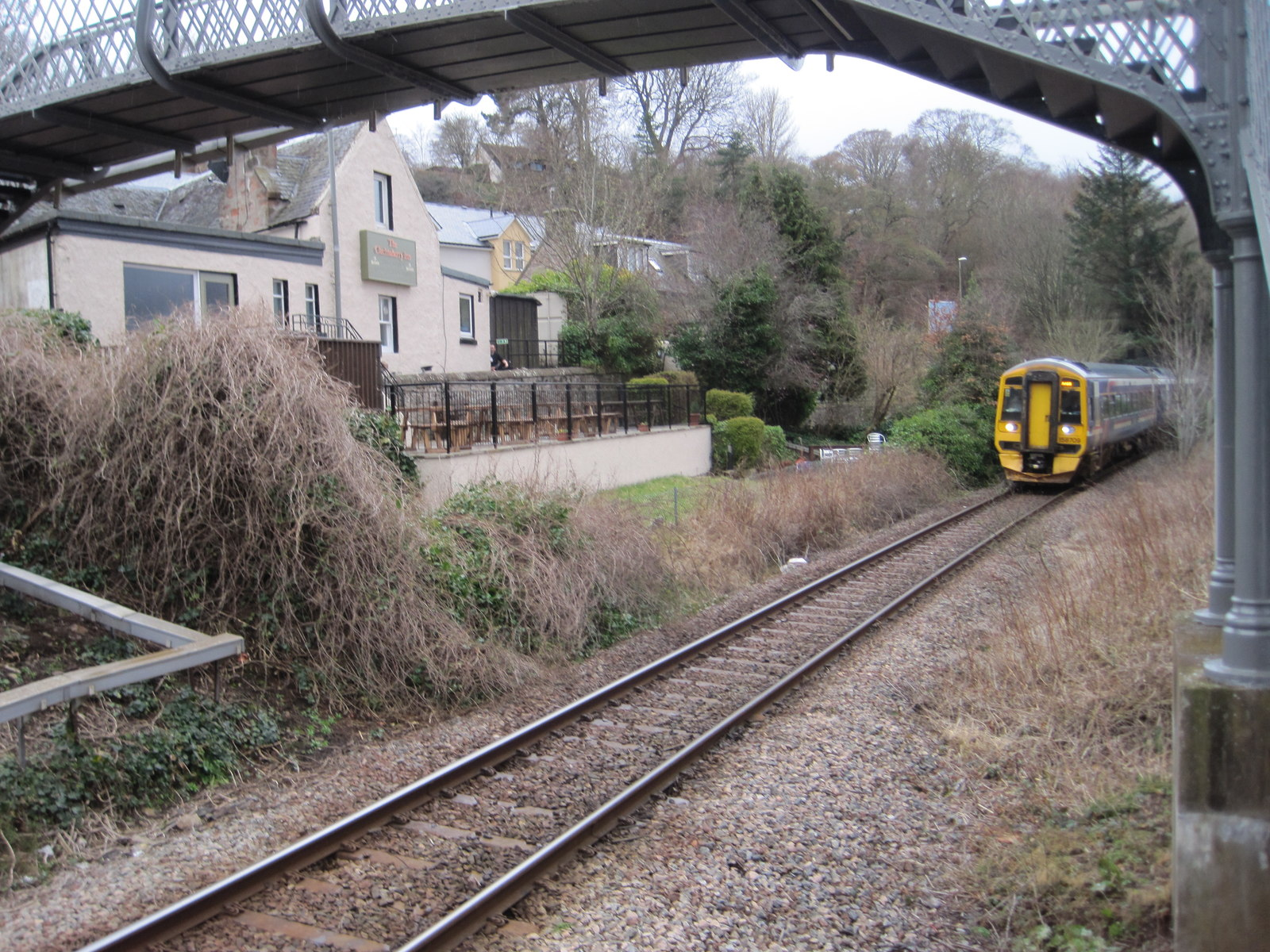
- The site of the station, looking west towards Bunchrew, in 2015

General information
- Location: Clachnaharry, Highland; Scotland
- Coordinates: 57.4889°N 4.2576°W
- Grid reference: NH647465
- Platforms: 1

Other information
- Status: Disused

History
- Original company: Highland Railway
- Pre-grouping: Highland Railway

Key dates
- 1 April 1868: Opened
- 1 April 1913: Closed
Location

Clachnaharry railway station served the village of Clachnaharry, Highland, Scotland from 1868 to 1913 on the Inverness and Ross-shire Railway.

== History ==
The station opened on 1 April 1868 by the Inverness and Aberdeen Junction Railway. The station closed to both passengers and goods traffic on 1 April 1913.

The nearby signal box of Clachnaharry is the last one in service on the line, used solely to operate the Caledonian Canal swing bridge.

| Preceding station | Historical railways | Following station |
|---|---|---|
| Inverness; Line and station open | Highland Railway; Inverness and Ross-shire Railway | Bunchrew; Line open, station closed |
