= Bunchrew =

Coordinates: 57.479°N 4.307°W

Bunchrew: Scottish Gaelic: Bun Craobh
- Location within the Inverness area
- OS grid reference: NH617455
- Council area: Highland
- Country: Scotland
- Sovereign state: United Kingdom
- Post town: Inverness
- Postcode district: IV3 8
- Police: Scotland
- Fire: Scottish
- Ambulance: Scottish
- UK Parliament: Caithness, Sutherland and Easter Ross
- Scottish Parliament: Skye, Lochaber and Badenoch

Bunchrew (Scottish Gaelic: Bun Craobh, meaning "Near to the Tree") is a small village in the Highland council area of Scotland. It is around 3 miles (5 km) west of Inverness, close to the south shore of the Beauly Firth on the A862.

The village has a small caravan park and camping site.

In the past Bunchrew also had a small railway station as part of Inverness and Ross-shire Railway, opening in 1862. However, the station closed to passengers in 1960 and goods in 1964.

In the late-19th century, Bunchrew had a large bone manure works close to its railway station. This was the subject of numerous investigations, due to the toxic fumes the factory emitted.

== Bunchrew House ==
Bunchrew House is a Scottish baronial-style mansion on the shore of the Beauly Firth, at the village's north end. The house was built in 1505 by Alexander Fraser of Lovat, then with only two rooms as little more than a blackhouse, the original wall of which stands behind the wooden panelling in the drawing room.

Under Simon Fraser, 6th Lord of Lovat, the house was expanded as a present to his wife Lady Jean, sister to the 2nd Earl of Moray. Jean oversaw much of the work, but died soon after its completion in 1621.

=== Clan Forbes ===
In 1673 the house was sold to John Forbes of Clan Forbes, the son of the then Provost of Inverness. After the purchase, Forbes is reported to have removed the motto "Fraser—Lord Lovat" carved over the front door—prompting 30 men of the Clan Fraser to smash the building's windows and destroy a mill on the grounds.

Before his death in 1688, John Forbes did much to improve the estate ground's, planting what is reputedly the "oldest holly tree in Scotland". He also planted a Lebanese cedar in the garden, now known as the "Loving Tree", due to the belief it would bring good luck to couples making an oath of love under its boughs.

During the Jacobite risings, Duncan Forbes (grandson of John and inheritor of Bunchrew House) played a large role in quashing the rebellion of '45. He was the first to report the landing of Charles Edward Stuart in Scotland to London, and allying with General George Wade during his march through the Highlands. A plan was concocted by Clan Fraser of Lovat to kidnap Forbes during the Siege of Culloden House, but was unsuccessful.

After the rebellion, Forbes supported severe punishment for its leaders. He was, however, financially ruined by the conflict, and never reimbursed by the British government whom he backed. According to legend, treasures from Bunchrew House were buried at the top of nearby Craig Dunain during this time, though they were never found.

=== Recent history ===
In 1842, Bunchrew House was sold by Clan Forbes to John Fraser Clan Fraser, later Fraser-Mackenzie. The house passed along the family line until it entered the hands of Malcolm Rifkind, then Scottish Secretary of State. In 1986, Rifkind converted Bunchrew House into a luxury hotel and wedding venue, which it remains to this day.

During the Second World War as well, an RAF unit was stationed at Bunchrew House.

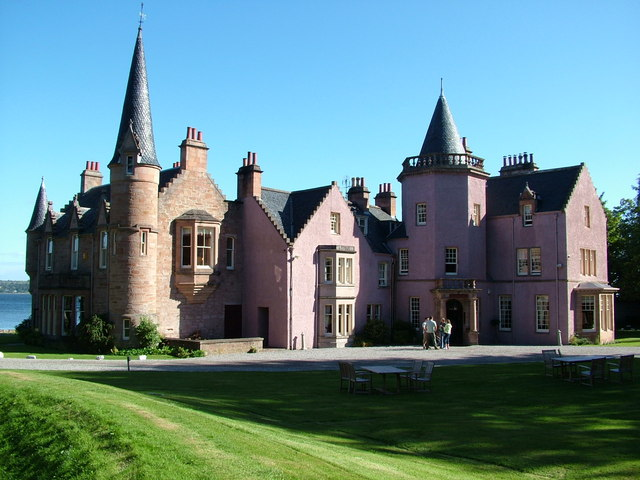
Bunchrew House and surrounding gardens

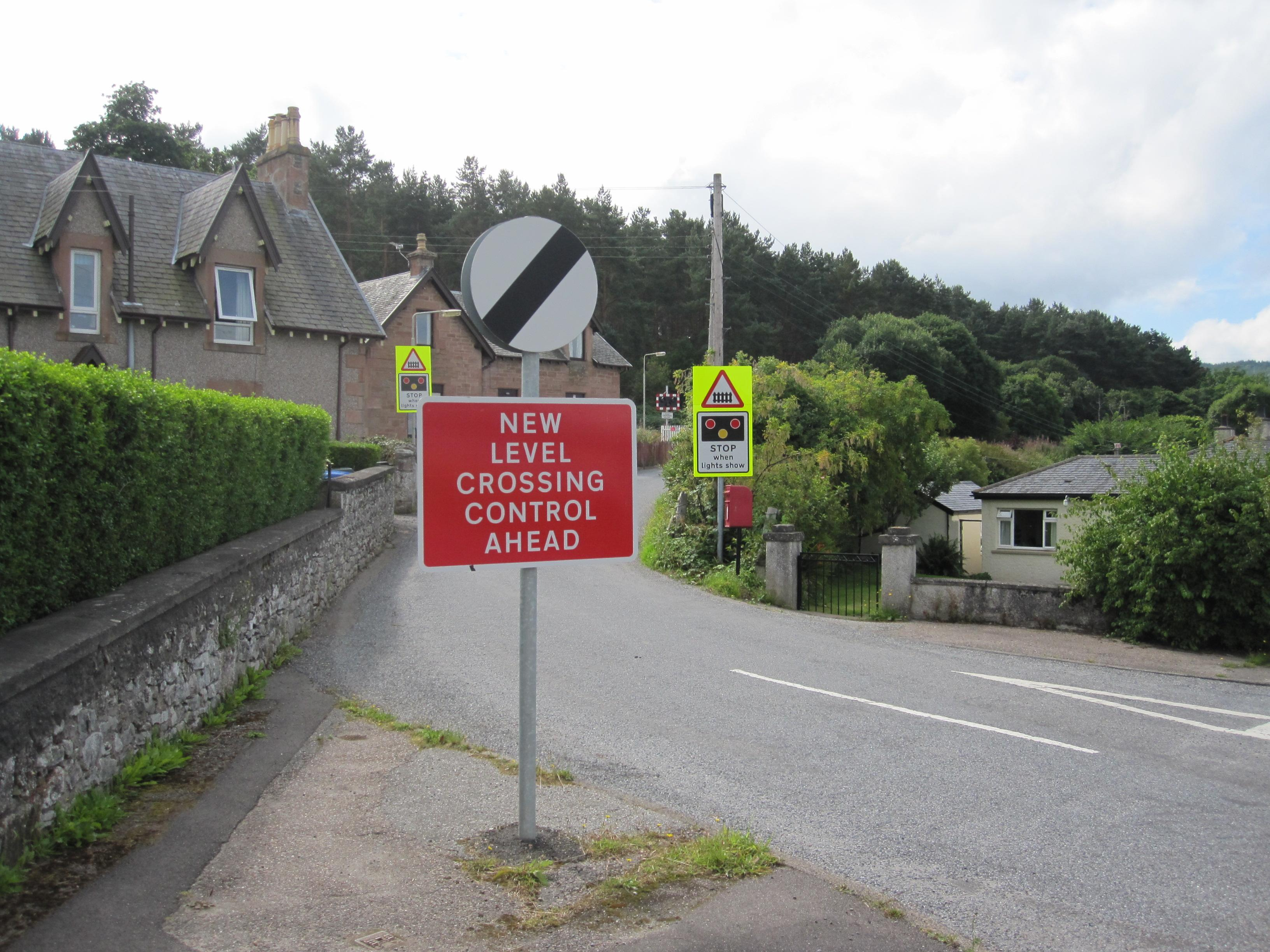
The village of Bunchrew, through which the Far North Line passes
