= Inchmore, Kirkhill =

Coordinates: 57.4726°N 4.3862°W

Inchmore: Scottish Gaelic: Innis Mhòr
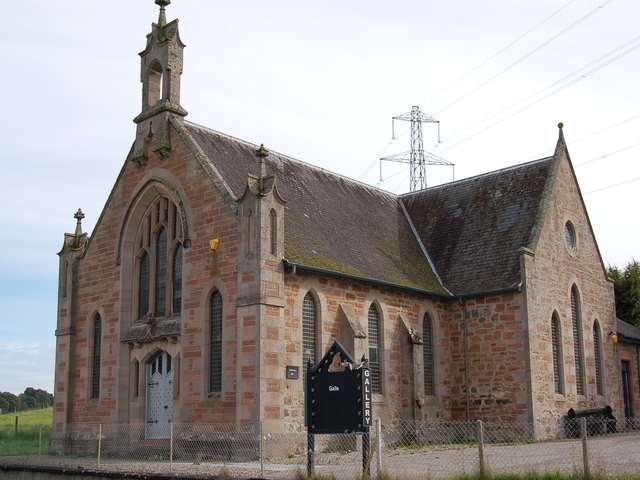
- Inchmore Gallery, in a former church

- Location within the Inverness area
- OS grid reference: NH570450
- Council area: Highland
- Country: Scotland
- Sovereign state: United Kingdom
- Post town: INVERNESS
- Postcode district: IV5
- Dialling code: 01463
- Police: Scotland
- Fire: Scottish
- Ambulance: Scottish
- UK Parliament: Inverness, Nairn, Badenoch and Strathspey
- Scottish Parliament: Skye, Lochaber and Badenoch

Inchmore (Scottish Gaelic: Innis Mhòr, meaning "Large Island in the Marsh") in the Highland council area of Scotland, just south of the Beauly Firth. It is 0.9 miles southeast (1.5 km) southeast of the village of Kirkhill and 6.2 miles (10 km) west of Inverness. The A862 runs directly through the middle of the village.

Historically, part of the village was known as Bogroy, from the Scottish Gaelic "Bòg Ruadh" meaning "Reddish-brown bog". Although the bog has since been drained, the village's pub, the Old North Inn, is colloquially still known as "The Bogroy". The village has a progressive art gallery within the old church, showcasing new works by Highland artists.
