= Kirkhill, Highland =

Coordinates: 57.47544°N 4.40953°W

Kirkhill: Scottish Gaelic: Cnoc Mhoire
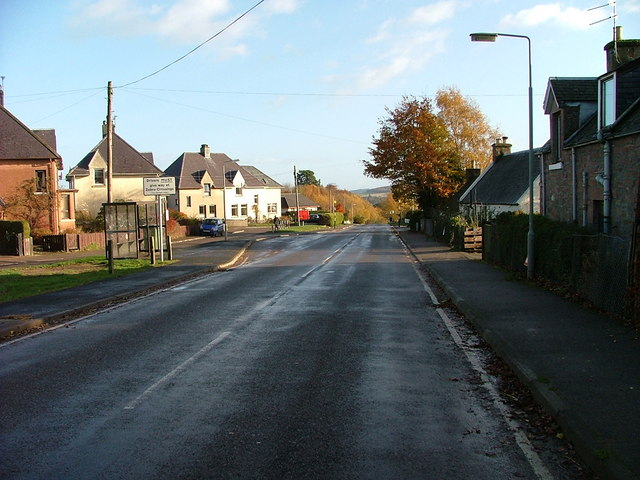
- The B9164, the main street running through Kirkhill

- Location within the Inverness area
- Population: 750 (2020)
- OS grid reference: NH556453
- Council area: Highland
- Lieutenancy area: Inverness
- Country: Scotland
- Sovereign state: United Kingdom
- Post town: Inverness
- Postcode district: IV5 7
- Dialling code: 01463
- Police: Scotland
- Fire: Scottish
- Ambulance: Scottish
- UK Parliament: Caithness, Sutherland and Easter Ross
- Scottish Parliament: Skye, Lochaber and Badenoch

Kirkhill (Scottish Gaelic: Cnoc Mhoire, meaning "Big Hill") is a small village and civil parish in the Highland council area of Scotland. It is 10 miles (16 km) west of Inverness and 2 miles (3.2 km) southeast of Beauly, close to the south opening of the Beauly Firth.

The village of Kirkhill encompasses the historic parish of Wardlaw to its north, the two areas merging in 1618.

Kirkhill also has a village hall and primary school, Kirkhill Primary, with a catchment area including Inchmore, Lentran, Drumchardine, Cabrich, Bunchrew, Clunes and Newtonhill. The local Church of Scotland, a merger of Kirkhill and Kiltarlity congregations, serves the village.

== Wardlaw Mausoleum ==
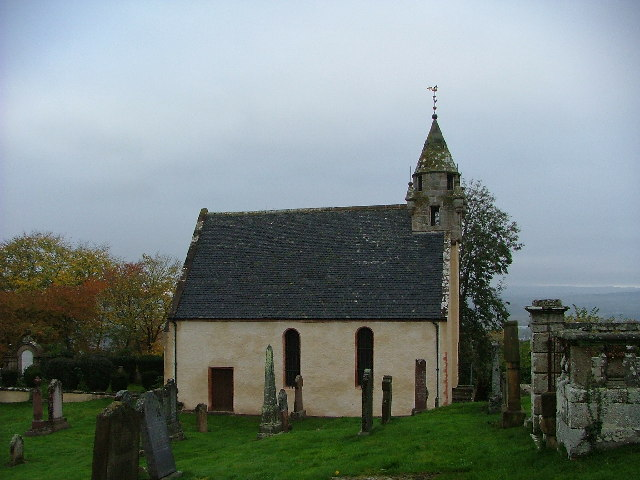
The Wardlaw Mausoleum, historic resting place of Clan Fraser of Lovat

Kirkhill is home to the Wardlaw Mausoleum, built in 1634 as the resting ground for the Chiefs of Clan Fraser of Lovat and used by the family until the early 19th century. In the 1990s, the Wardlaw Mausoleum Trust was formed to repair the building, then in heavy disrepair.

In 1722, the 11th Lord Lovat raised the roof of the mausoleum and constructed a tower overhead. After his execution for the part he played in the Jacobite rebellion, legend had it the Lord Lovat's body was moved in secret, from the Church of St Peter ad Vincula in London to the family mausoleum. However, analysis of his supposed skeleton by the University of Dundee in 2018, declared the bones were of a young woman.
