= IV postcode area =

Postcode area within the United Kingdom

Inverness
- Postcode area
- Coordinates: 57.600°N 4.200°W
- Country: United Kingdom
- Postcode area: IV
- Postcode area name: Inverness
- Post towns: 31
- Postcode districts: 53
- Postcode sectors: 84
- Postcodes (live): 7,356
- Postcodes (total): 10,739
- Statistics as at May 2020

The IV postcode area, also known as the Inverness postcode area, is a group of 52 postcode districts for post towns: Achnasheen, Alness, Avoch, Beauly, Bonar Bridge, Cromarty, Dingwall, Dornoch, Elgin, Fochabers, Forres, Fortrose, Gairloch, Garve, Invergordon, Inverness, Isle of Skye, Kyle, Lairg, Lossiemouth, Muir of Ord, Munlochy, Nairn, Plockton, Portree, Rogart, Strathcarron, Strathpeffer, Strome Ferry, Tain and Ullapool in north Scotland.

Mail for the IV postcode area is processed at Inverness Mail Centre, along with mail for the KW and HS postcode areas.

== Coverage ==
Approximate coverage of the postcode districts:

Postcode district	Post town	Coverage	Local authority area(s)
IV1	INVERNESS	Inverness centre and north, including the Longman, plus North Kessock and Kilmuir	Highland
IV2	INVERNESS	Inverness east, plus Culloden, Balloch and Ardersier	Highland
IV3	INVERNESS	Inverness west, plus Dochgarroch, Abriachan and Bunchrew	Highland
IV4	BEAULY	Beauly, Kiltarlity, Struy, Cannich, Tomich	Highland
IV5	INVERNESS	Kirkhill, Inchmore, Moniack (Note: believed to contain IV5 7PQ) and Cabrich	Highland
IV6	MUIR OF ORD	Muir of Ord, Marybank, Strathconon (Note: contains IV6 7QE)	Highland
IV7	DINGWALL	Conon Bridge, Culbokie, Maryburgh	Highland
IV8	MUNLOCHY	Munlochy	Highland
IV9	AVOCH	Avoch	Highland
IV10	FORTROSE	Fortrose	Highland
IV11	CROMARTY	Cromarty	Highland
IV12	NAIRN	Auldearn	Highland
IV13	INVERNESS	Tomatin	Highland
IV14	STRATHPEFFER	Strathpeffer	Highland
IV15	DINGWALL	Dingwall	Highland
IV16	DINGWALL	Evanton	Highland
IV17	ALNESS	Alness	Highland
IV18	INVERGORDON	Invergordon	Highland
IV19	TAIN	Tain, Nigg, Edderton	Highland
IV20	TAIN	Hill of Fearn, Portmahomack, Balintore	Highland
IV21	GAIRLOCH	Gairloch	Highland
IV22	ACHNASHEEN	Achnasheen	Highland
IV23	GARVE	Garve	Highland
IV24	ARDGAY	Bonar Bridge, Ardgay, Spinningdale, Culrain	Highland
IV25	DORNOCH	Dornoch	Highland
IV26	ULLAPOOL	Ullapool	Highland
IV27	LAIRG	Lairg, Durness, Tongue, Scourie	Highland
IV28	ROGART	Rogart	Highland
IV30	ELGIN	Elgin	Moray
IV31	LOSSIEMOUTH	Lossiemouth	Moray
IV32	FOCHABERS	Fochabers	Moray
IV36	FORRES	Forres	Moray
IV40	KYLE	Kyle of Lochalsh, Raasay	Highland
IV41	ISLE OF SKYE	Kyleakin	Highland
IV42	ISLE OF SKYE	Breakish	Highland
IV43	ISLE OF SKYE	Isleornsay	Highland
IV44	ISLE OF SKYE	Teangue	Highland
IV45	ISLE OF SKYE	Armadale, Upper Breakish	Highland
IV46	ISLE OF SKYE	Tarskavaig	Highland
IV47	ISLE OF SKYE	Carbost	Highland
IV48	ISLE OF SKYE	Sconser	Highland
IV49	ISLE OF SKYE	Broadford	Highland
IV51	PORTREE	Portree, Uig	Highland
IV52	PLOCKTON	Plockton	Highland
IV53	STROME FERRY	Strome Ferry	Highland
IV54	STRATHCARRON	Applecross, Lochcarron, and Shieldaig	Highland
IV55	ISLE OF SKYE	Dunvegan	Highland
IV56	ISLE OF SKYE	Struan	Highland
IV63	INVERNESS	Drumnadrochit, Glenurquhart and Invermoriston	Highland
IV99	INVERNESS	Jobcentre Plus	non-geographic

The postcode area had IV33, IV34 and IV35 covering in small easterly areas the post towns of Carron, Knockando and Rothes. These were transferred to the post town of Aberlour, and in August 1994 recoded into AB38.

IV27 (Lairg) is the largest postcode district in the United Kingdom by area, at 1,393 square miles.

== Map ==
IV postcode area map, showing postcode districts in red and post towns in grey text, with links to nearby AB, HS, KW and PH postcode areas.

Detailed map of postcode districts and post towns in and around Inverness

== See also ==
- Postcode Address File
- List of postcode areas in the United Kingdom
