= Inverness and Ross-shire Railway =

UK railway company

Overview
- Locale: Scotland
- Dates of operation: 11 June 1862–30 June 1862
- Successor: Inverness and Aberdeen Junction Railway

Technical
- Track gauge: 1,435 mm (4 ft 8 1/2 in)
- Length: 57.5 miles (92.5 km)

The Inverness and Ross-shire Railway was a Scottish railway company formed in 1860 to build a line from Inverness to Invergordon. It opened in 1862 as far as Dingwall and in 1863 to Invergordon. It was extended to a Bonar Bridge station in 1864. It provided the basis for later extensions that eventually reached Thurso, forming the Far North Line. The Dingwall and Skye Railway branched off at Dingwall to reach the Kyle of Lochalsh.

In 1862 it amalgamated with the Inverness and Aberdeen Junction Railway and later became a constituent of the Highland Railway. The line continues in use at the present day.

== First railways ==
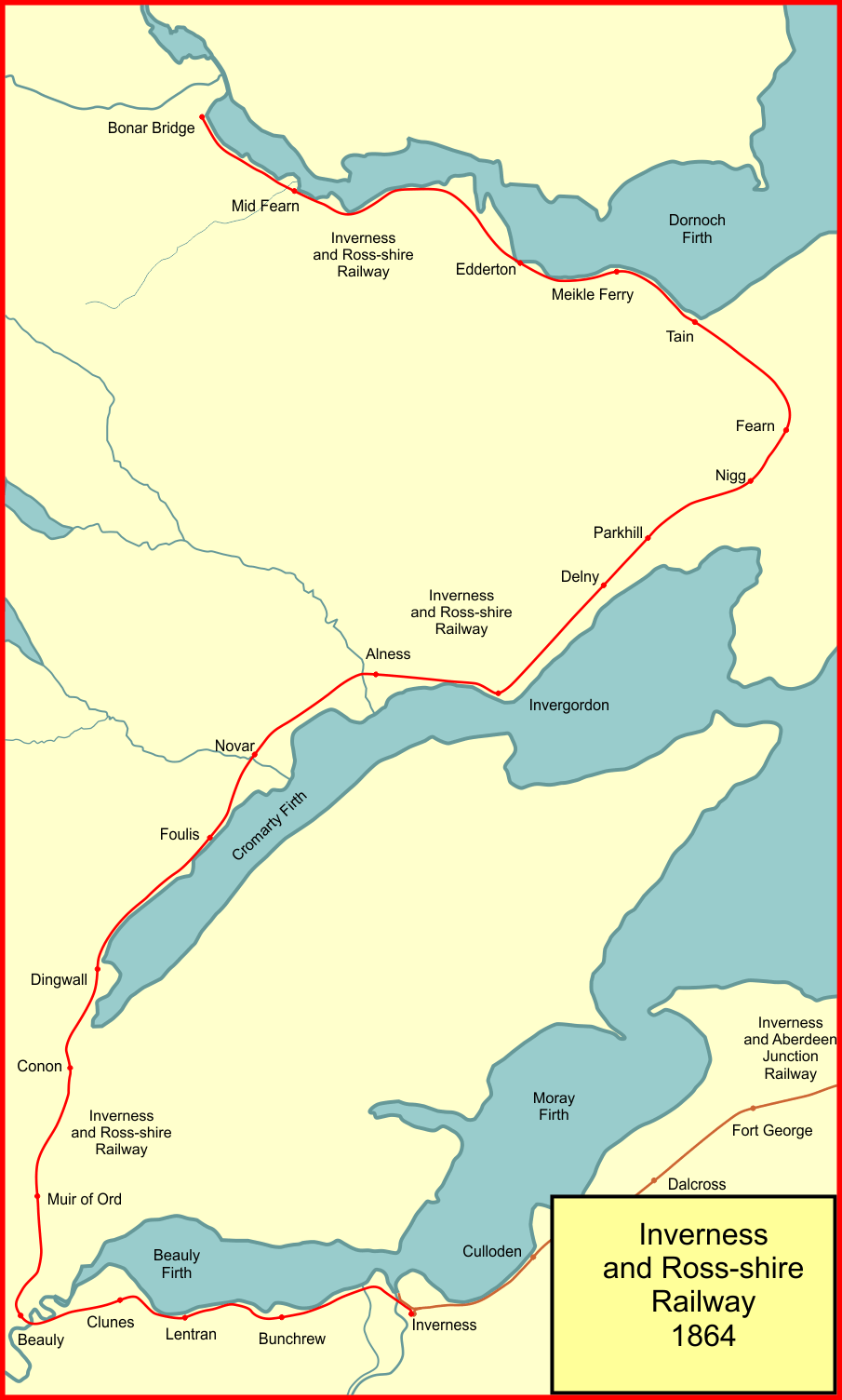
The Inverness and Ross-shire Railway system

Aberdeen obtained a railway connection to the south in 1850. The advantages to a community that had a railway service were already plainly visible, as were the serious disadvantages in not being so connected, and interested persons in Inverness started to think about their situation.

At the time a railway heading directly south towards Perth was not technically feasible, and attention was given to reaching Aberdeen, and getting a connection southwards by that circuitous route. A first step in that direction was the opening of the Inverness and Nairn Railway in 1855. This was described at the time as being only a beginning. The Nairn line was on easy terrain in the coastal strip, and any extension would be over more challenging ground.

Thoughts in Inverness turned also to the possibilities of a northward railway. At first this was expected to be by ferry crossing from Nairn to the north side of the narrows of the Cromarty Firth; from there railways could extend on easier ground to Invergordon, Tain and Dingwall.

== Inverness and Ross-shire Railway authorised ==
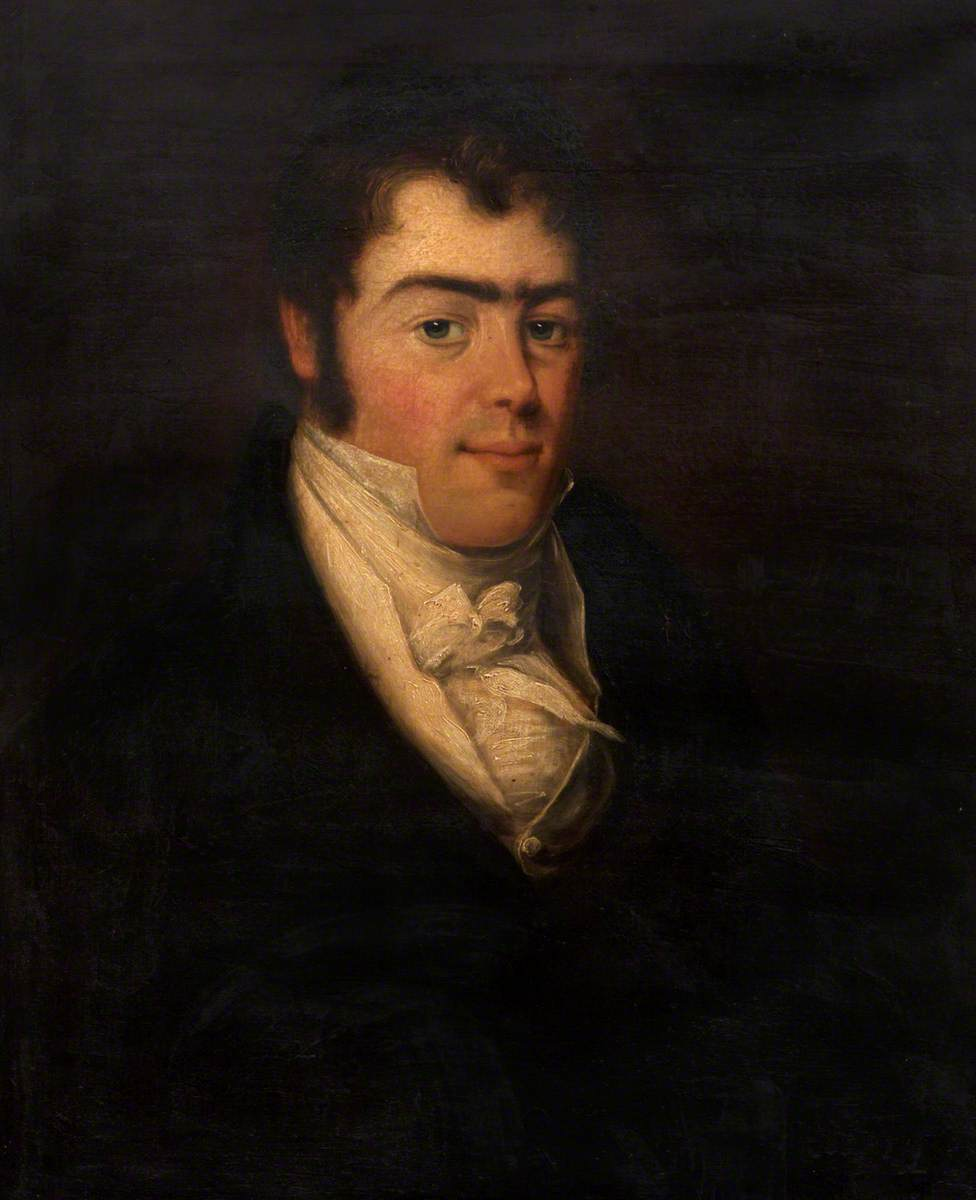
Joseph Mitchell

In the years immediately following, confidence in engineering projects -- encouraged by the local engineer Joseph Mitchell led to a more practical scheme from Inverness directly round the western extremity of the Beauly Firth and then northwards. Sir Alexander Matheson of Ardross was the driving force in ensuring the formation of a company to carry out this work, encouraged by the far-sighted engineer Joseph Mitchell, and a provisional committee met in Inverness in January 1859 to promote such a line.

Inverness and Ross-shire Railway Act 1860
- Act of Parliament
- Parliament of the United Kingdom
- Long title: An Act for making a Railway from Inverness to Invergordon, to be called "The Inverness and Ross-shire Railway;" and for other Purposes.
- Citation: 23 & 24 Vict. c. cxxxi

Dates
- Royal assent: 3 July 1860

Other legislation
- Repealed by: Highland Railway Act 1865

Status: Repealed

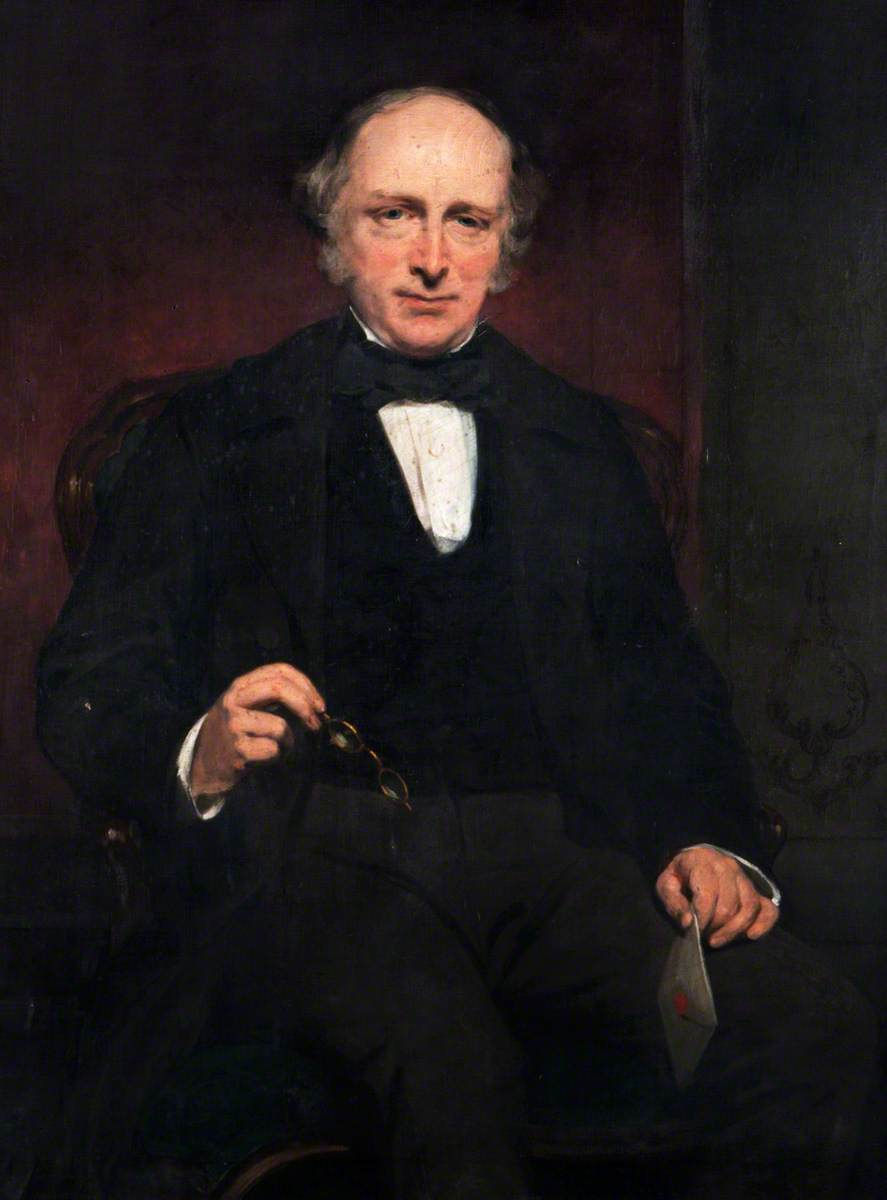
Alexander Matheson

So it was that the Inverness and Ross-shire Railway Bill was unopposed in Parliament, and the Inverness and Ross-shire Railway Act 1860 (23 & 24 Vict. c. cxxxi) was given royal assent on 3 July 1860, for a line from Inverness to Invergordon, a distance of 31 miles (50 km). This included a crossing of the Caledonian Canal by swing bridge, considered by Ross to be a novelty at the time, and river crossings of the Beauly, Conon, Sgitheach, Allt Graad, and Alness Rivers. Authorised share capital was £215,000.

== Construction and opening ==
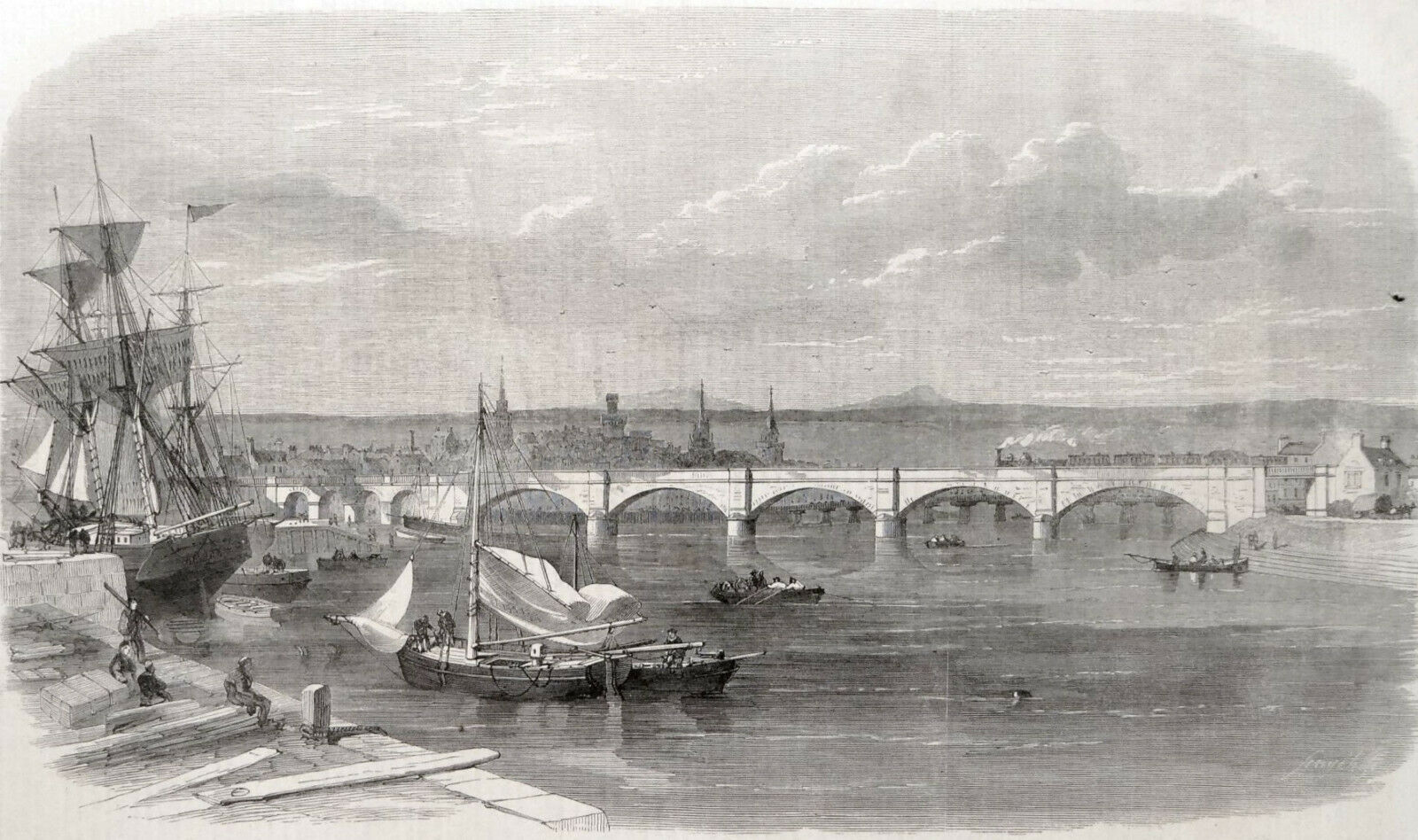
The Ness railway viaduct at the time of opening

The Inverness station of the Nairn company faced east, and the Ross-shire line would approach from the west, so west facing platforms were built at the station; there was a by-pass line, originally provided as the Nairn company's approach to Nairn Harbour, on Shore Street. When the line was opened it was referred to as the Rose Street Curve.

On 10 June 1862 Colonel Yolland of the Board of Trade carried out an inspection of the first section of the line and approved it, and on 11 June 1862 the first section of the route opened, from Inverness to Dingwall. The remainder of the route was delayed by a dispute over land acquisition, but on 25 March 1863 the line was opened throughout to Invergordon. (Note: Ross gives the opening to Invergordon as 23 May 1863 on page 175, but this seems to be a mistake. Quick gives 23 March, but the discrepancy may be due to ceremonial and full public openings.)

The extension to Invergordon was at first considered to be a feeder to the southward line, rather than a step towards the Far North.

== Amalgamation ==
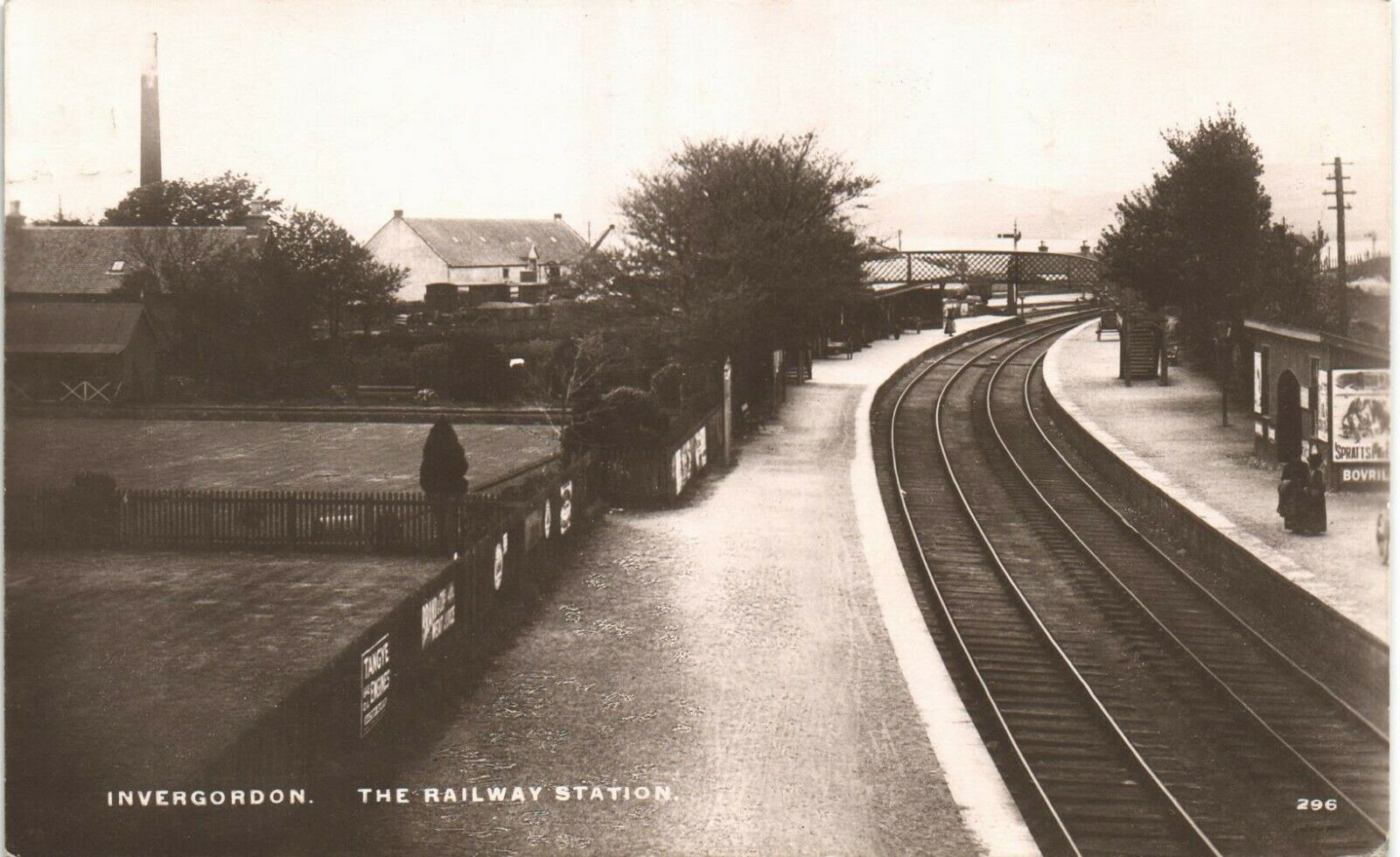
Invergordon station

In the mean time, legal powers to amalgamate with the Inverness and Aberdeen Junction Railway were sought, and the Inverness and Aberdeen Junction Railway Act 1862 (25 & 26 Vict. c. cxiii) was duly obtained on 30 June 1862. The Inverness and Nairn Railway had already amalgamated with the Aberdeen Junction Railway Company, on 17 May 1861.

== Further north ==
A further extension, from Invergordon to Bonar Bridge was now planned, and was authorised by the Inverness and Aberdeen Junction Railway (Bonar Bridge Extension) Act 1863 (26 & 27 Vict. c. xxxii) of 11 May 1863. The act gave the powers to the Inverness and Aberdeen Junction Railway. The extension opened to Meikle Ferry on 1 June 1864. The ferry enabled onward road journeys to Dornoch and beyond, although the station was not close to the actual ferry landing stage. (Note: The Dornoch Firth Bridge was opened in 1991, crossing the Firth at this point.) The line was continued to Bonar Bridge, 57 miles (92 km) from Inverness, on 1 October 1864. The Bonar Bridge station is actually at Ardgay, west of the Kyle of Sutherland and not conveniently situated for the community of Bonar Bridge.

== Formation of the Highland Railway ==
The railways based on Inverness were working in partnership. On 1 February 1865 Inverness and Aberdeen Junction Railway, the Inverness and Perth Junction Railway and the Inverness and Ross-shire Railway amalgamated, and on 29 June 1865 a change of name was authorised by the Highland Railway Act 1865 (28 & 29 Vict. c. clxviii): the enlarged company was to be called the Highland Railway Company.

== Still further north ==
The notion of a Far North Line was now gathering pace, and the independent Sutherland Railway was authorised by the Sutherland Railway Act 1865 (28 & 29 Vict. c. clxix), opening to Golspie in 1868. Further extensions took place, until Wick and Thurso were connected by rail on 28 July 1874.

== Inverness viaduct collapse ==
In 1989 the River Ness masonry arch viaduct in Inverness collapsed on 7 February due to turbulent conditions in the river. It was reconstructed in a different form.

== The route today ==
The line is still open, being part of the Far North Line.

== Locations ==
- Inverness; opened 7 November 1855 for Inverness and Nairn Railway; still open;
- Rose Street Junction; with former Harbour line from Welsh's Bridge Junction, now upgraded to Rose Street curve;
- Connection to Muirtown basin (on Caledonian Canal);
- Clachnaharry; opened 1 April 1868; closed 1 April 1913;
- Bunchrew; opened 11 June 1862; closed 13 June;
- Lentran; opened 11 June 1862; closed 13 June;
- Clunes; opened 20 August 1863; closed 13 June 1960;
- Beauly; opened 11 June 1862; closed 13 June 1960; reopened 15 April 2002; still open.
- Muir of Ord; junction for Fortrose branch 1904 – 1960;
- Conon; opened 11 June 1862; closed 13 June 1960; reopened as Conon Bridge 8 February 2013; still open;
- Dingwall; opened 11 June 1862; still open;
- Dingwall North Junction; divergence of Dingwall and Skye Railway to Kyle of Lochalsh, 1870 to present day;
- Fowlis; opened 23 March 1863; renamed Foulis 20 March 1916; closed 13 June 1960;
- Novar; opened 23 March 1863; renamed Evanton 1 June 1937; closed 13 June 1960
- Alness; opened 23 March 1863; closed 13 June 1960; reopened 7 May 1973; still open;
- Invergordon; short harbour branch 1874 - 1971;
- Invergordon; opened 23 March 1863; still open;
- Delney; opened 1 June 1864; renamed Delny 1865; closed 13 June 1960;
- Parkhill; opened 1 April 1861; renamed Kildary 1 May 1868; closed 13 June 1960;
- Nigg; opened 1 June 1864; closed 13 June 1960;
- Fearn; opened 1 June 1864; still open;
- Tain; opened 1 June 1864; still open;
- Meikle Ferry; opened 1 June 1864; closed 1 January 1869;
- Edderton; opened 1 October 1864; closed 13 June 1960;
- Mid Fearn; opened 1 October 1864; closed 31 March 1865;
- Bonar Bridge; opened 1 October 1864; renamed Ardgay 2 May 1977.

The onward route northward from Bonar Bridge was opened in 1868 by the Sutherland Railway.
