= Siege of Inverness =

The siege of Inverness may refer to:

- Siege of Inverness (1429), part of the conflict between the Lord of the Isles and the Scottish crown
- Siege of Inverness (1562), part of the Mary, Queen of Scots civil war
- Siege of Inverness (1649), part of the Scottish civil war that formed part of the Wars of the Three Kingdoms
- Siege of Inverness (1650), part of the Scottish civil war that formed part of the Wars of the Three Kingdoms
- Siege of Inverness (1689), part of a feud between the Clan MacDonald of Keppoch and the city of Inverness
- Siege of Inverness (1715), part of the 1715 Jacobite rising
- Siege of Inverness (1746), part of the 1745 Jacobite rising
