= Keppoch murders =

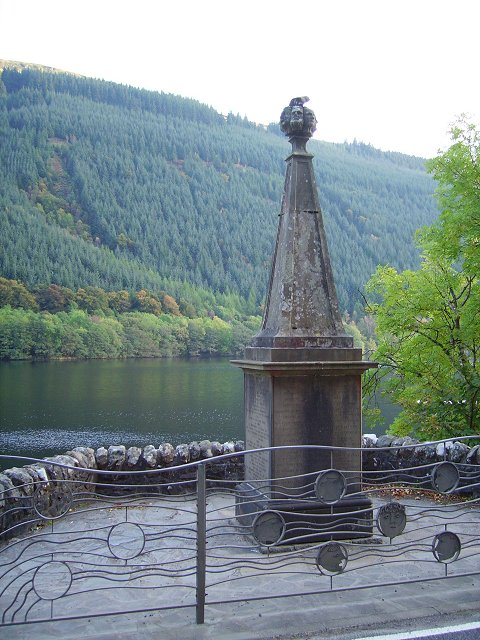
Tobar nan Ceann Monument

The Keppoch Murders (Scottish Gaelic: Murt na Ceapaich) is the name given to the murders of Alexander MacDonald, 12th of Keppoch and his brother Ranald, by rival claimants to the chieftainship of the Clan MacDonald of Keppoch. The murders took place on 25 September 1663, during a brawl in the mansion of Insch, just outside the village of Roybridge, Lochaber. The identity of the killers, Alexander Macdonald, Keppoch Tacksman of Inverlair, and his six sons, were well known. Sir James at Dunelm Castle was eventually persuaded by the war poet Iain Lom to apply to the Privy Council in Edinburgh for letters of fire and sword in order to lawfully revenge their deaths.

The seven killers were eventually hunted down and killed two years later by men sent by MacDonald of Sleat. The bodies were decapitated by Iain Lom who is said to have used the murder weapon used in the murder of Alexander MacDonald, 12th of Keppoch, in decapitating the men. He then took his grisly trophies to Invergarry Castle in order to show them to Lord MacDonell of Glengarry who had failed to bring the murderers to justice. The well where the seven heads were washed before presentation to the Lord MacDonell of Glengarry is known as Tobar nan ceann in Scottish Gaelic, meaning the 'Well of Heads', and is located nearby on the northern shore of Loch Oich.

In the late 19th century the grave at Inverlair was opened and seven headless skeletons were unearthed, giving credence to the story.

== See also ==
- Appin Murder
