= Alexander Macdonald, 17th of Keppoch =

Alexander Macdonald of Keppoch
- 17th of Keppoch
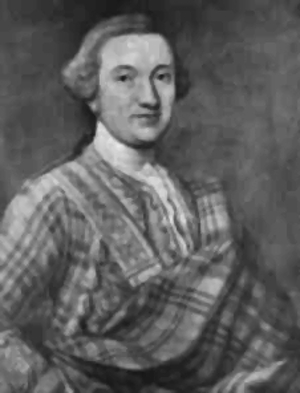
- Portrait dated 1765, said to be of Alexander Macdonald, formerly owned by the descendants of a daughter of his cousin Major Donald Macdonald of Tir na Dis, near Spean Bridge
- Tenure: 1729–1746
- Predecessor: Coll Macdonald, 16th of Keppoch
- Successor: Ranald Macdonald, 18th of Keppoch
- Born: c. 1695
- Died: 16 April 1746; Drumossie Moor, Inverness
- Cause of death: Killed at Battle of Culloden
- Residence: Keppoch House, Roybridge
- Wars and battles: 1715 Jacobite Rising Sheriffmuir; 1745 Jacobite Rising; Prestonpans Clifton Falkirk Culloden
- Offices: Colonel, Macdonald of Keppoch's Regiment 1745-1746
- Spouse: Isobel Stewart
- Issue: Ranald (-1788); Alasdair (-1809); Angus 'Ban' (1725-1815)
- Parents: Coll Macdonald; Barbara Macdonald

Alexander Macdonald, 17th of Keppoch (died 1746) was a Scottish Jacobite and clan chief who took part in both the 1715 and 1745 Jacobite risings. He was killed at the Battle of Culloden leading a regiment composed largely of members of his clan, the MacDonalds of Keppoch (Scottish Gaelic: Clann Dòmhnaill na Ceapaich).

Some genealogies give him the title 16th of Keppoch, following a previous dispute of succession.

== Life ==
Keppoch was the son of 16th chief Coll Macdonald and Barbara, daughter of Sir Donald Macdonald of Sleat; his paternal aunt was the poet Sìleas na Ceapaich. A record of his matriculation at the University of Glasgow in 1713 suggests that he was born in the mid-late 1690s.

The family had been supporters of the House of Stuart since the Civil War, when 12th chief Donald 'Glas' had joined Montrose's campaign against the Scottish Parliament. Alexander's father had used the 1689 Jacobite rising to further his local grievances; the questionable legal status of the Keppoch estates, ostensibly held on a lease from the chiefs of Clan Mackintosh, had been recognised by the government for many years as one of the main sources of political instability in the western Highlands. In 1715 Alexander joined his father in the rising in support of the Stuart claimant James, fighting at the Battle of Sheriffmuir.

Following the rising's collapse, Alexander fled to France, where like many Scottish exiles he gained experience in the royal army, reaching the rank of captain. He later returned to Scotland; his father probably died around 1729, as in that year Alexander was confirmed in the lease of Keppoch.

As chief, Keppoch emphasised the traditional arrangement of tenure based on military service, commenting in 1740 that the rent of his estates was "five hundred men". While Jacobite prospects were at a low ebb during the 1730s he continued to have contact with the exiled Stuart court, and was created a baronet in the Jacobite peerage in June 1743.

Keppoch was married to Isabel, daughter of Robert Stewart of Appin, and had several legitimate and illegitimate children. A posthumous portrait exists, dated 1765 and possibly taken from an earlier miniature; a source from the time of the 1745 rising described "old Keppoch" as a "Man of an austere aspect, tall, lusty and strong, much inur'd to War, and can endure any Hardships".

== The 1745 rising ==
Keppoch was one of the first to join Charles Edward Stuart in 1745. Scottish Jacobites were dismayed when Charles arrived in Scotland without the French support they had requested; most tried to persuade him to leave, but the commitment of Keppoch and Donald Cameron of Lochiel in the first weeks of August made the rising viable. Keppoch supposedly argued that once Charles landed, Stuart supporters had a duty to protect him but his motives may have been more complex; in 1743 John Murray of Broughton recorded that Keppoch was in a poor financial state and had considered government military service to save his estates.

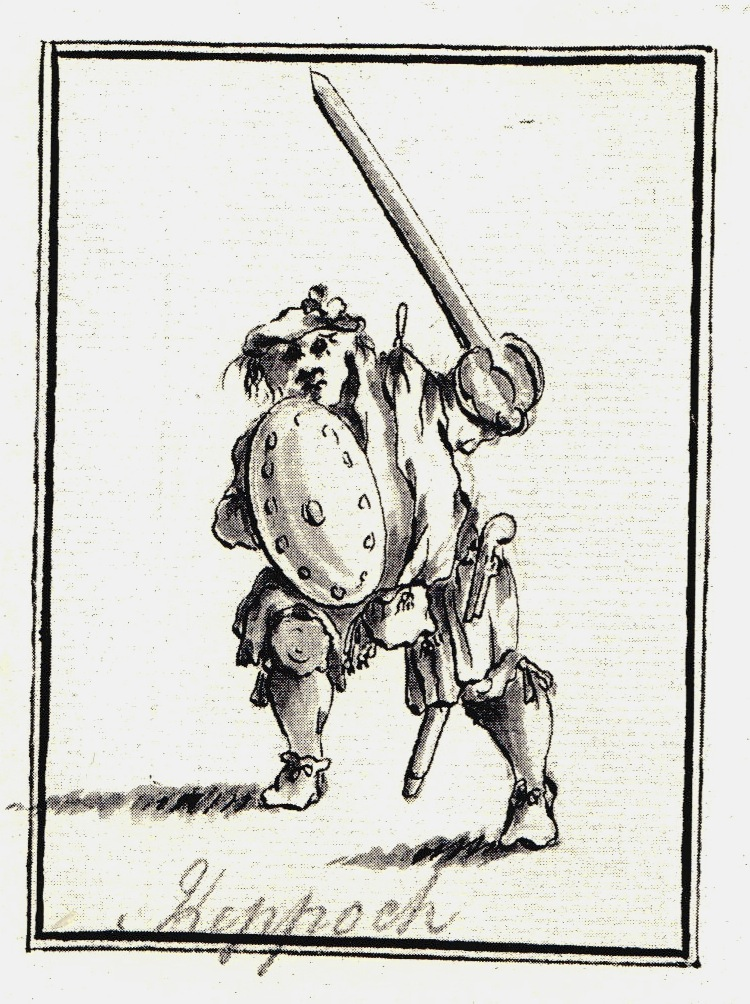
Sketch of Keppoch during the 1745 rising by the anonymous 'Penicuik artist'.

Keppoch's French military experience meant that he was a prominent member of the Jacobite Council of War, set up to advise on overall strategy. His own regiment, based around his tenants from Lochaber along with a company from Glen Coe and some Macgregor and Mackinnon clansmen, served throughout the Rising, although it gained a reputation for plundering and poor discipline. Although the regiment had a strength of 300 when Charles's standard was raised at Glenfinnan, many of the men deserted a few days later due a "private quarrel" between them and their chief, allegedly because the devoutly Protestant Keppoch refused to allow a priest to accompany his Catholic tenants. As the Macdonald lairds of Keppoch had for many years held their land effectively by force of arms rather than legal title, Keppoch's leverage over his tenants may have been less than other clan chiefs, and Charles Stuart's biographer McLynn has suggested that Keppoch's resulting reliance on "sheer force of personality" may have contributed to the higher desertion rate and indiscipline. He was also alleged to have forced tenants out; a report dated August 1745 suggested that Keppoch had written to local tacksmen suggesting they would be "proceeded against with burning and houghing" if they did not join him.

Keppoch's men, led by his cousin, Maj. Donald Macdonald of Tirnadris, were involved in the first skirmish of the Rising when they ambushed Captain John Scott's soldiers at Highbridge near Fort William on 16 August. Keppoch and Clanranald later went to Dundee, where they succeeded in collecting some public money and were credited with capturing two government arms shipments. Keppoch and his regiment subsequently took part in the advance south to England, were involved in the night action at Clifton on 18 December, and later, brought up to a strength of around 500, played a significant role in the Battle of Falkirk Muir. Prisoners taken after the rising alleged that Keppoch had again resorted to force to fill in the ranks, kidnapping a number of men from Lochbroom parish in March 1746. On 20 March 1746 Keppoch and Lochiel jointly issued a letter condemning the treatment of civilians by the pro-Government Campbell militia, stating that they "look[ed] on such cruelty with horror and detestation" and threatening to "hang a Campbell for every house that shall hereafter be burned by them".

== Culloden ==
By April the Jacobites were short of money and supplies and the leadership mostly agreed that forcing a decisive battle at Culloden was the best option available. Keppoch's regiment, which had been besieging Fort William, rejoined the main army the day before the battle and took part in the unsuccessful attack on the government encampment that night.

The following morning Keppoch's men, on the Jacobite left wing, had to advance into intense government musket fire, chain and canister. A well-known tradition first recorded by Walter Scott claims that when Keppoch saw his men reluctant to advance, he reproached them by shouting Mo Dhia, an do thrèig clann mo chinnidh mi? ("My God, have the children of my clan forsaken me?") before charging alone with pistol and sword drawn. More contemporary accounts, however, suggest that Keppoch led the attack surrounded by a small group of close kinsmen with the rest of his men following in support. During the advance Keppoch had his right arm shattered by a musket-ball: he was subsequently hit in the chest and died some time later while being carried off the field by his illegitimate son Aonghas Bàn. While his regiment appear to have partly rallied in an attempt to defend against government cavalry, they suffered heavy casualties and dispersed after the Jacobite defeat.

Keppoch's brother Donald and nephew John Mackenzie were also killed at Culloden; another brother, Archibald, had been killed in the front line at Prestonpans. He was succeeded as chief by his son Ranald.

== Assessment ==
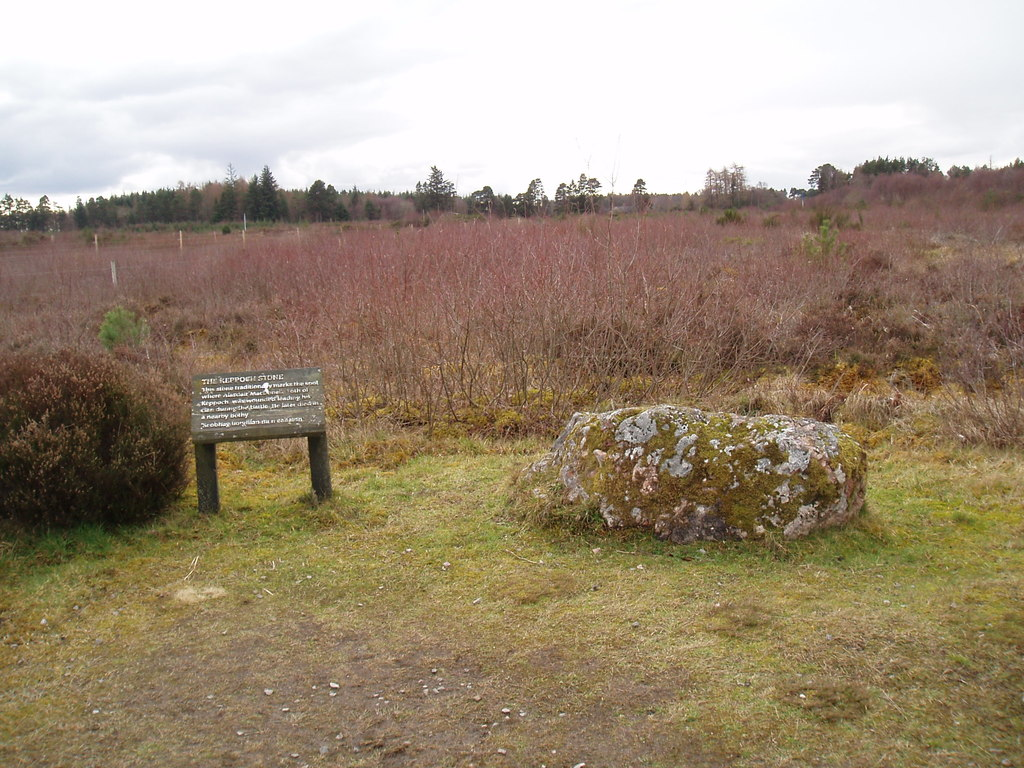
The 'Keppoch Stone' at Culloden, said to mark the place that Alexander Madonald fell.

Subsequent assessments of Keppoch's character and motives have been strongly coloured by prevailing attitudes to Jacobitism. His colleague James Johnstone called him a "gentleman of uncommon merit and [...] universally lamented", whereas a 1746 pamphlet describing the trial of his nephew Donald said that "he is a man dreaded, but not beloved", adding that he "slept in the open fields in his Plaid" during the rising. By contrast, a 19th-century Macdonald family memoir describes him as an "amiable and gallant man [...] who endeared himself to all ranks".

== In film ==
Keppoch (played by George McBean) and a number of men of his regiment are prominently featured in the 1964 Peter Watkins docudrama Culloden.
