= Battle of Mamsha =

- Part of Clan Fraser of Lovat and Clan Donald feuds
- Clan crests of Clan Fraser of Lovat (left) and Clan Donald (right)
Date	1429
Location	Mamsha, Inverness-shire, Scottish Highlands
Result	Fraser victory

Belligerents
Clan Fraser of Lovat	Clan Donald

Commanders and leaders
Hugh Fraser, 3rd Lord Fraser	Alexander of Islay, Earl of Ross

Strength
Unknown	Unknown

Casualties and losses
Unknown	Unknown

The Battle of Mamsha was a Scottish clan battle that took place in 1429 and that was fought by the Clan Fraser of Lovat who defeated the invading Clan Donald.

== Background ==
In 1429, Alexander of Islay, Earl of Ross, 3rd Lord of the Isles and chief of Clan Donald, besieged Inverness Castle and burnt the town of Inverness to ashes. Hugh Fraser, 3rd Lord Fraser having obstructed his passage through his territory and causing him to take a circuitous route, the Lord of the Isles was determined to punish the Fraser chief. He set out from Lochaber leaving a strong party in Inverness and made reprisals on Fraser and his tenantry. The Lord of the Isles' force was strengthened day by day with new arrivals from the west until he came to lay siege to Fraser's castle of Lovat. However, the Frasers were too many and attacked the MacDonalds near Lovat, while the people of the country killed all of those who straggled from the main body. The Frasers attacked the MacDonalds at Fanellan, and so they were obliged to abandon the siege and retreat.

== The battle ==
Several skirmishes took place along the march but when the MacDonalds reached the moor of Caiplich which was a few miles west of Inverness, they halted and stood at bay to give battle. The MacDonalds fought with courage and determination, but to no avail and were defeated by the Frasers. The MacDonald's being completely routed and defeated by the Fraser's vassals, the engagement was remembered locally as the Battle of Mamsha.

== Aftermath ==
The men of the Isles were for a long time thereafter unwilling to interfere with the peace and tranquility of Fraser country in Inverness-shire, that was known as The Aird.
