= Battle of Mulroy =

Scottish clan battle fought in August 1688 in the Lochaber district of Scotland

Coordinates: 56°54′11″N 4°50′19″W

- Part of the Scottish clan wars
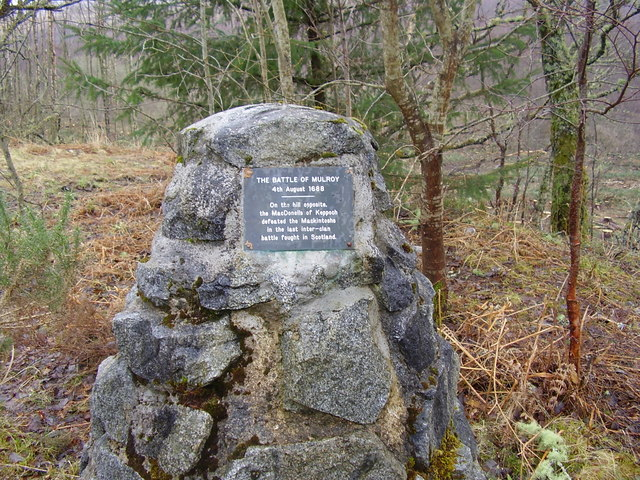
- Cairn at roadside near Maol Ruadh, site of the Battle of Mulroy
Date	August 1688
Location	Mulroy, near Roybridge, Braes of Lochaber, Scotland grid reference NN271826
Result	Rebel victory

Belligerents
Rebels: Clan MacDonald of Keppoch; Clan Cameron	Clan Mackintosh; Government Independent Highland Company

Commanders and leaders
Coll Macdonald, 16th of Keppoch	Lachlan MacKintosh of Mackintosh; Kenneth Mackenzie of Suddie †

Strength
According to Alexander Mackenzie: half the number that Mackintosh had. According to Mackintosh-Shaw: more than the number that Mackintosh had.	According to Alexander Mackenzie: 1,000 men. According to Alexander Mackintosh-Shaw: 1,000 men.

Casualties and losses
Unknown	Many of Mackintosh's followers were slain, including Mackenzie of Suddie. Great numbers were also taken prisoner.

Registered battlefield
- Official name: Battle of Mulroy
- Designated: 30 November 2011
- Reference no.: BTL26

The Battle of Mulroy (Blàr a' Mhaoil Ruaidh in Scottish Gaelic) was a Scottish clan battle fought in August 1688 in the Lochaber district of Scotland. It was fought between the Clan Mackintosh who were supported by government troops under Kenneth Mackenzie of Suddie against the Clan MacDonald of Keppoch who were supported by the Clan Cameron over disputed lands in the Braes of Lochaber. The battlefield has been inventoried and protected by Historic Scotland under the Scottish Historical Environment Policy of 2009.

== Background ==
In the 15th century the chief of Clan Mackintosh had been granted a charter for the lands of Glenroy and Glen Spean, but the Clan MacDonald of Keppoch had refused to give up possession and had declined to recognise Mackintosh's title. In spite of several attempts that had been made with or without the authority of the law to eject them, the MacDonalds had been able to hold on to the Brae of Lochaber. In September 1667, a marauding party of MacDonalds had invaded Glen Esk and stolen cattle from Lindsay of Edzell, whose daughter Mackintosh had recently married. In 1672, Mackintosh had unsuccessfully sued for a commission to eject the MacDonalds of Keppoch from the Brae of Lochaber. In 1678-79, Mackintosh made preparations to invade the Brae of Lochaber and take the law into his own hands, but was obstructed by the Earl of Moray and the Earl of Huntly. In 1681, Mackintosh finally received a commission against MacDonald of Keppoch, but with no satisfactory result. Archibald MacDonald of Keppoch died in 1682 and was succeeded by his son, Coll of the Cowes, who sent his own account in petition to the Privy Council of Scotland to settle the dispute by a "legal decision or amicable determination". However, Mackintosh had him apprehended, imprisoned in Inverness Tolbooth and put on trial, although he was later released on bail.

For a few years both sides remained quiet, but in 1688 matters came to a crisis with the Privy Council having renewed to Mackintosh the commission he had originally received in 1681. The chief of Clan Mackintosh having received a commission of "fire and sword" was determined to invade the lands of the Clan MacDonald of Keppoch and eject them for not paying rents that Mackintosh claimed from them as the superior of their lands. Ewen Cameron of Lochiel attempted to arrange matters between them, but failed and proceeded immediately to Edinburgh. While he was away the MacMartin-Camerons (a sept of his clan) who were closely related to the MacDonalds of Keppoch through frequent inter-marriages, finding that Lochiel had left home without leaving them any instruction as to what to do, offered their services to MacDonald of Keppoch.

Clan Macpherson and Clan Grant, who had been ordered to aid Mackintosh in the commission, did not support him but Mackintosh, with about one thousand of his own men, and a company of the king's troops under Mackenzie of Suddie (an Independent Highland Company) marched to Lochaber by order of the Privy Council.

In 1685, Mackenzie of Suddie's Independent Highland Company had received instructions from the Privy Council to take more aggressive and punitive action against the caterans and broken men and had been so successful in this task that it was recommended that another Independent Highland Company should be set up to help keep the peace in the south. In 1688, the Privy Council ordered Mackenzie of Suddie and his company to support Mackintosh against MacDonald of Keppoch.

== The battle ==
According to Alexander Mackenzie, on 4 August 1688 MacDonald of Keppoch, with about half of the number of men that Mackintosh had, easily defeated the invading force and took their leader, Mackintosh of Mackintosh, prisoner. However, according to Alexander Mackintosh-Shaw, the MacDonalds of Keppoch had been reinforced by their kinsmen, the Clan MacDonell of Glengarry and the MacDonalds of Glencoe, and had the numerically superior force. Mackintosh-Shaw states that as the daylight had appeared, Mackintosh discovered that the MacDonalds had drawn up on a ridge above them which gave them a decided advantage over his own force down below. Both Mackintosh and Mackenzie of Suddie ordered their men to advance up the hill and attack, with the MacDonalds coming down the hill upon them armed with swords, targes and Lochaber axes which obliged them to give way. According to William Forbes Skene, Mackintosh had advanced on Keppoch itself but found the place deserted and learned that the MacDonalds of Keppoch along with the MacDonalds of Glengarry and Glencoe were stationed at Mulroy, for the purpose of attacking at day-break. Mackintosh immediately resolved on attacking them and his army had nearly surmounted the height of Mulroy when the battle began, which was maintained with obstinacy on both sides. The Cameron of Lochiel Memoirs state that the battle was fierce and bloody and that Mackintosh had the misfortune to be defeated. Many of Mackintosh's followers were slain, including four of the leaders, as well as Mackenzie of Suddie who was mortally wounded. Great numbers were also taken prisoner.

== Aftermath ==
Before releasing Mackintosh, MacDonald of Keppoch compelled him to renounce his claims and titles to the lands that were in dispute. However, according to Skene, the reason that MacDonald released Mackintosh was because the Macphersons, who were a member of the confederation of Clan Chattan of which Mackintosh was chief, suddenly appeared to assail the victors. MacDonald of Keppoch, although victorious, was in no condition to renew the fight with a fresh party and therefore surrendered Mackintosh to the Macphersons.

Cameron of Lochiel was held responsible by the Privy Council for the conduct of his vassals and was accused as the principal author of the bloodshed. A majority of the Lordships decided that he should be arrested and put on trial. However, with the help of George Mackenzie, Viscount Tarbat who was a relative of Lochiel's and also a member of the Privy Council, he managed to escape back to his friends in Lochaber. Mackenzie of Suddie's Independent Highland Company suffered very heavy losses against the MacDonalds of Keppoch at Mulroy.

According to the Clan Donald account, in the aftermath of the battle of Mulroy, Mackintosh did not want to risk a repetition of his defeat which gave MacDonald of Keppoch an opportunity: in April 1689, MacDonald at the head of just under one thousand men, marched through Mackintosh's lands causing severe loss of property and halted on the outskirts of Inverness. The townspeople there had assisted Mackintosh on his expedition into Lochaber which had resulted in the battle at Mulroy, and MacDonald had other scores to settle with them. He entered the town with no opposition and threatened to burn it down unless he was paid 4000 merks. The town remained in a state of terror for three days until the arrival of Lord Dundee who acted as a mediator. Dundee arranged for the town to pay MacDonald 2000 dollars but was not able to recover cattle that had been taken from Mackintosh.

== Pipe music ==
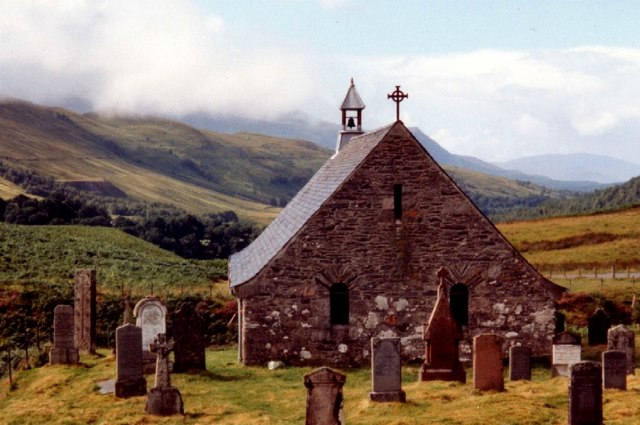
Medieval church on the Brae of Lochaber

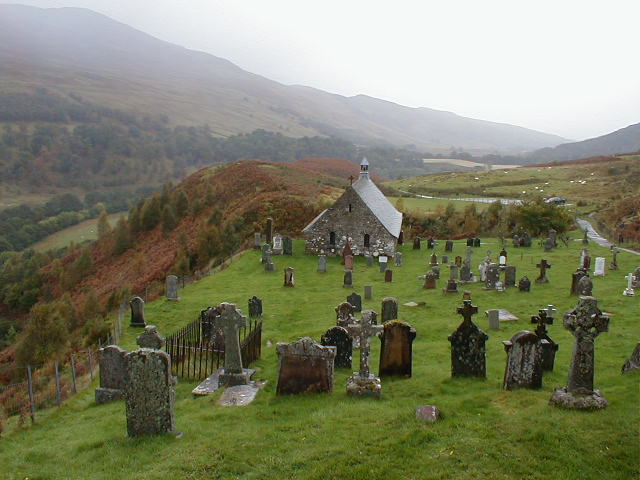
Another view of the Brae of Lochaber

The famous pipe tune MacDonald took the Brae on them highlighted the advantage the Highlanders had by initiating the attack from the high ground.

== The last clan battle ==
The Battle of Mulroy is sometimes described as being the last of the private clan battles fought between Scottish clans. However, that is perhaps inaccurate as the Mackintoshes had official government support for their actions against the Macdonalds, and their army was in part made up of government troops from an Independent Highland Company under Mackenzie of Suddie. That would therefore leave the Battle of Altimarlach, fought in 1680 between the Campbells and Sinclairs, as the last true clan battle. In the latter half of the 17th century, clans would commit themselves to violence only with official sanction from the crown and thus Mackintosh had moved against MacDonald of Keppoch only because the crown recognized the validity of his claim but had also actively intervened on his behalf by supplying him with troops.
