= Coll Macdonald, 16th of Keppoch =

Scottish clan chief (c. 1664–1729)

Coll Macdonald, 16th of Keppoch (c. 1664–1729), was a Scottish clan chief and prominent Jacobite, active in both Dundee's rising of 1689 and the Jacobite rising of 1715. He was chief of the Macdonalds of Keppoch, holding land in Lochaber.

He is sometimes known as "Coll of the Cows" (Scottish Gaelic: Colla nam Bo) or "the Colonel of the Cows", a nickname apparently given by John Graham, 1st Viscount Dundee. Along with other chiefs of Keppoch, he was also referred to by the Gaelic patronymic title Mac Mhic Raonuill, "the son of Ranald's son".

== Life ==
Keppoch was the son of the 15th chief Archibald (Gilleasbuig) Macdonald and Mary Macmartin of the Macmartin Camerons.

The anti-Jacobite Whig historian Thomas Babington Macaulay mentioned Keppoch in his History of England, describing him as "an excellent specimen of the genuine Highland Jacobite [...] insulting and resisting the authority of the crown". Keppoch first appears in records in 1682, as a student at the University of St. Andrews. Learning of his father's death, he left university to make funeral arrangements and (as claimed by a petition he submitted in 1683) to make an "accommodation" with his father's landlord, the chief of Clan Mackintosh. Keppoch claimed that Mackintosh had him summarily incarcerated in Inverness Tolbooth, while Mackintosh claimed that Keppoch was liable to pay taxes owed by his father. From this point the dispute between the Macdonalds of Keppoch and the Mackintoshes escalated, with Mackintosh obtaining government support through a Commission of Fire and Sword against Keppoch, who later retaliated by burning the Castle of Dunachton.

At the Battle of Mulroy in 1688, often described as the last "clan battle", Keppoch and his clansmen were victorious over a larger force of Mackintosh men, backed by government troops, sent into Lochaber to occupy it. Keppoch's activities were to be a source of trouble for the authorities for many years. Colonel John Hill, governor of Fort William, was to write of Keppoch that "he speaks better than any Highlander I know, and is a pretty fellow [...] 'tis pity but he were honest". Matters between Keppoch and Mackintosh were eventually smoothed over by a 1700 legal agreement, which confirmed Keppoch in his lease of some of the disputed lands.

Perhaps hoping to gain support in his local disputes, Keppoch became a committed Jacobite supporter after the Glorious Revolution. Along with his brother he appears to have spent some time in Ireland with the recently deposed James as part of the latter's campaign there: the town of Inverness's "unneighbourly practices" against Keppoch's people during his absence was to provoke another feud. Keppoch subsequently took part in Viscount Dundee's Jacobite rising of 1689. He was sent by Lochiel to provide an escort for Dundee, but decided to take the opportunity to settle his own business too: arriving outside Inverness, he famously threatened to burn the town to the ground unless given 4000 merks and a "scarlet lace coat". His actions led to a strong reprimand from Dundee, who felt they would harm James's cause. An indignant Keppoch departed with his plunder, but later returned with a force of clansmen which took part in the Battle of Killiecrankie.

Although the Jacobites were ultimately defeated at the Battle of Cromdale, Keppoch immediately continued his feud with the Mackintoshes by ravaging their lands and attempting to lay siege to Rothiemurchus Castle, leading Mackintosh to ask for a renewal of his Commission of Fire and Sword. Keppoch agreed to take the 1691 oath of allegiance to King William, thereby narrowly escaping the fate of his Macdonald kinsmen at Glencoe, but he subsequently gave evidence against Robert Campbell of Glenlyon and Breadalbane accusing them of involvement in the massacre.

In the 1715 rising, Keppoch once again joined the Jacobite force and fought at the Battle of Sheriffmuir. He fled to South Uist and then to France after the failure of the rising, returning in early 1719. He is thought to have died around 1729, when his son was confirmed in the lease of the Keppoch lands.

== Family ==
Keppoch married Barbara Macdonald, a daughter of Sir Donald Macdonald of Sleat, 3rd Baronet.

They had the following issue:

- Alexander Macdonald, 17th of Keppoch (d. 16 April 1746)
- Donald Macdonald (d. 16 April 1746)
- Archibald Macdonald (d. 21 September 1745)
- Margaret Macdonald

He was succeeded as chief by his eldest son Alexander. His sister, Sileas na Ceapaich, was a poet with an immortal contribution to Scottish Gaelic literature. Another iconic Gaelic poet of the era, Iain Lom, was the chief bard of Keppoch during much of Coll's time as chief and, during the Stuart Restoration, he was also appointed by King Charles II as the first Poet Laureate of Scotland.

== "Coll of the Cows" ==
Keppoch is often credited with the nickname "Coll of the Cows" (Colla nam Bo); most versions of this are sourced from Macaulay. The origin of the story lies in evidence given in 1690 at Edinburgh by Lieutenant James Colt of Colonel Ramsay's Regiment. Colt, who had been taken prisoner by Dundee's forces in the 1689 rising, said that Dundee had nicknamed Keppoch "Coll of the Cowes" due to his ability to find cattle to feed the army even "when they were driven to the hills out of the way".

Napier, in his Memoirs of Dundee, said that the original record showed that Colt had actually said that Dundee had used the nickname "Colonel of the Cows", and that later writers had mistaken the abbreviation "Col." in the records as referring to Keppoch's first name, Coll.
