= Fraser of Inverallochy =

Scottish clan

The Frasers of Inverallochy descend from Simon Fraser, 6th Lord Lovat (c. 1572–1633), and are one branch of the Clan Fraser of Lovat, who hail from Inverallochy. Simon was Sheriff of Inverness, and married twice. The Frasers of Lovat descend from this first marriage, while the Frasers of Inverallochy descend from a second marriage, through a son, Simon Fraser of Inverallochy. This Simon Fraser, 1st of Inverallochy, had a great-grandson, Charles Fraser, 6th of Inverallochy, who was created Lord Fraser of Muchall by James Francis Edward Stuart, known to Jacobites as King James VIII of Scotland, in the Jacobite Peerage of Scotland.
