= Moniack Castle =

Coordinates: 57°27′35″N 4°24′56″W

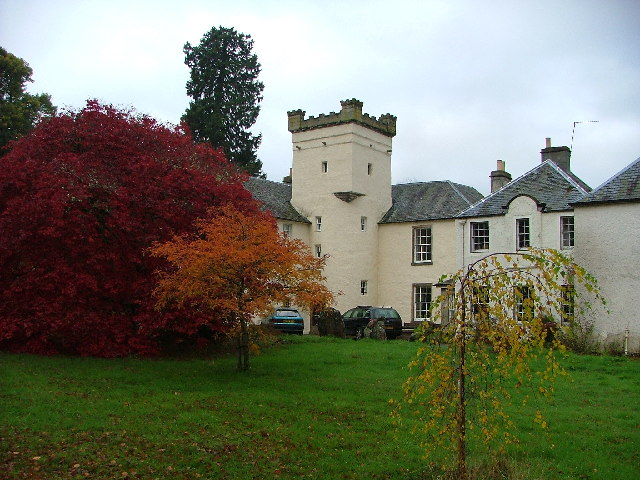
Moniack Castle

Moniack Castle is a 16th-century tower house located 7 miles (11 km) west of Inverness, and just south of Beauly in Highland, Scotland. The castle was built in 1580 by members of the Clan Fraser. The castle is protected as a category B listed building.

== History ==
The L-plan castle has been altered many times since its construction. The crenellated parapet was added in 1804 and the castle was extended in the 1830s. The interiors include a Roman Catholic chapel. In the grounds of the castle is the Balblair Stone, a Pictish symbol stone, carved with the figure of a man, which was moved here from Kilmorack in 1903.

Moniack Castle is the only castle that still belongs to a branch of the Lovat Frasers. This branch is known as the Moniack Frasers and is the largest offshoot of the clan. It consists of over 250 descendants from the Hon. Alastair Fraser and Lady Sybil (née Grimston). Alastair was given the castle by his elder brother, Simon Fraser, 14th Lord Lovat, in 1926. The castle is occupied by Rory Fraser and his family.

Moniack Castle Winery was started by Philippa Fraser in 1979. It was based in the castle, and produced a range of fruit wines, liqueurs and mead. The winery closed in 2012. Moniack Mead is now produced by Lyme Bay Winery in Devon.
