= Oliver (Scottish surname) =

- Language: Anglo-French

Origin
- Meaning: "Bearer of the olive branch" or "Ancestor"
- Region of origin: Scottish Borders

Other names
- Variant form: Olivier

Many Scottish people with the surname Oliver are descended from the Oliver family that settled in the Border area of Scotland and England by the middle of the 13th century. By the beginning of the 16th century, they had become a kinship group in which all its members bore the same surname of Oliver.

== History and territory ==
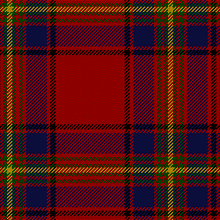
Oliver tartan

The main territory in which the Oliver surname lived and exercised control was Jedforest, an indeterminate area situated south west and south of the Border town of Jedburgh. Originally the lands of Jedforest were held directly by the King, and as his tenants in chief the Olivers would have held their lands by Crown charter, but after a number of changes in feudal superior, Jedforest was granted by the King to the Clan Douglas (the Red Douglas) under whose protection the Olivers subsequently lived.

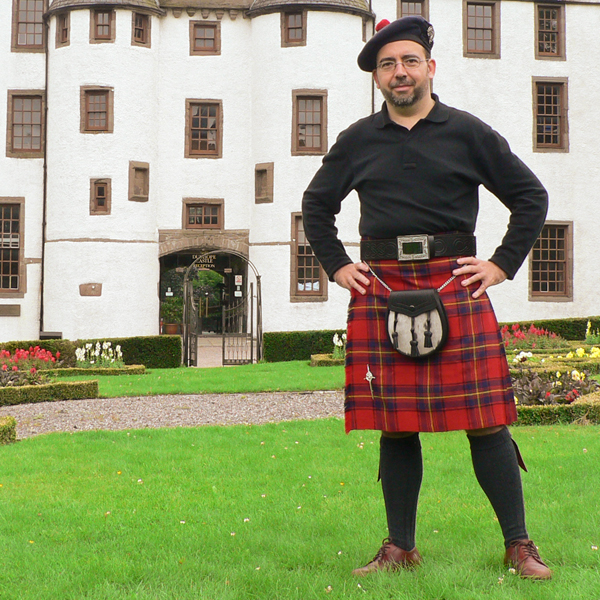
Oliver kilt

Certain Highland tourist literature -and associated maps- explain that the Olivers were a sept of Clan Fraser. This erroneous idea has arisen from the fact that the Frasers living in southern Scotland before moving north to the Inverness area held the barony of Oliver Castle in the 13th century, having acquired it by marriage with the heiress of Oliver, son of Kyluert who then held it. At no time has any family with an Oliver surname ever lived at Oliver Castle, or in the area around it.

It would seem that the Oliver Surname developed slowly over a period of time spanning the 13th to the 15th centuries, and the early records indicate that the first Olivers of any importance in the Border area were merchants in the strategic town of Berwick on Tweed. This town was then part of Scotland, and in the 13th century John Oliver was a merchant who operated a trading network in south east Scotland and in Northumberland. When John of Balliol, King of Scots, rebelled against Edward I, King of England, amongst his many supporters was Robert Oliver, merchant of Berwick -presumably son of John Oliver.

Oliver
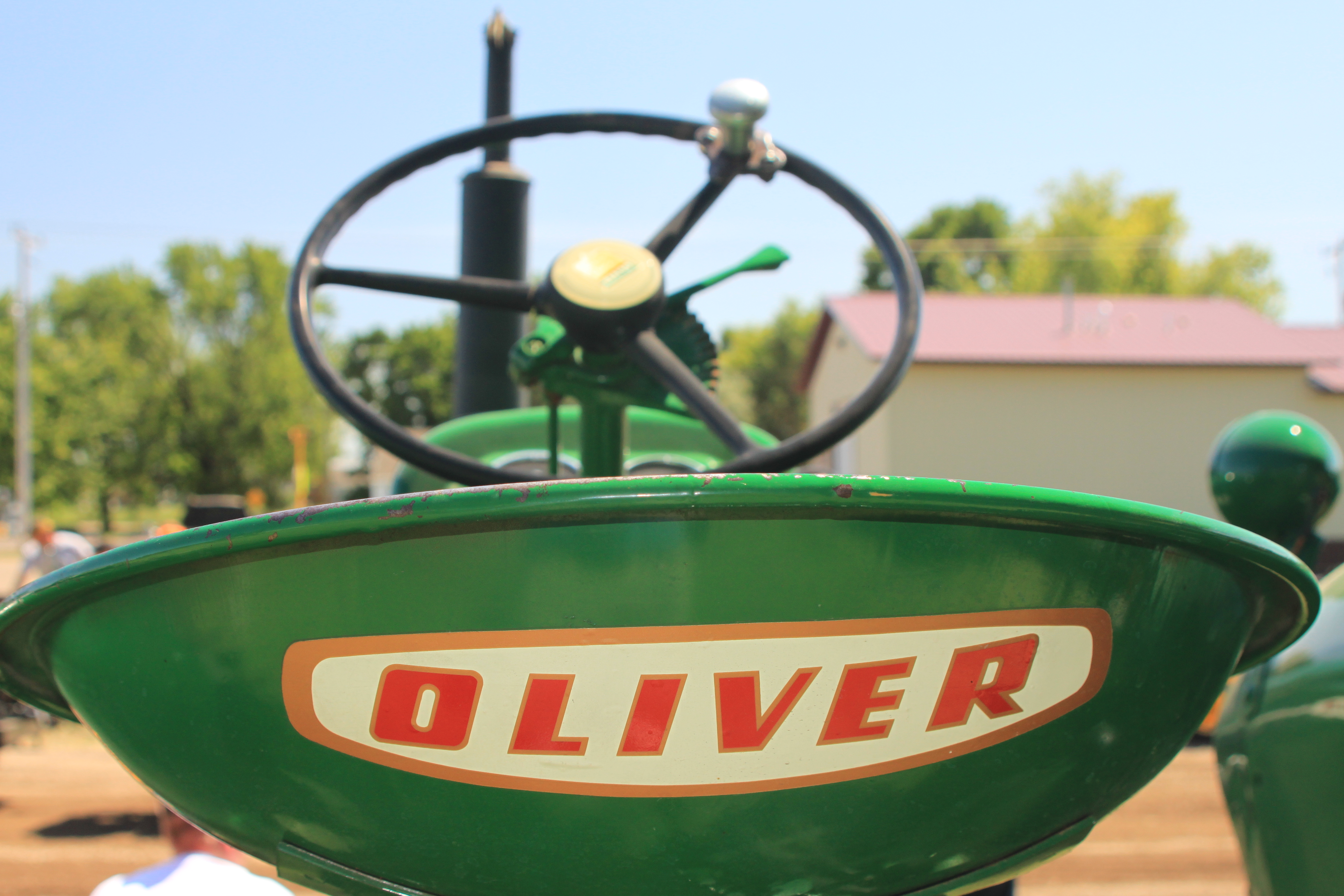

Other names
- Variant forms: Oliver; Olivier

The surname Oliver is of several different origins including French Norman and Scottish.

The French derivation of the surname "Oliver" is from the Old French personal name Olivier.

== Scottish surname ==
Oliver
- Language: Latin or Scandinavian

Origin
- Meaning: "Bearer of the olive branch" or "Ancestor"
- Region of origin: Scottish Borders

Other names
- Variant form: Olivier

Many Scottish people with the surname Oliver are descended from the Oliver family that settled in the Border area of Scotland and England by the middle of the 13th century. By the beginning of the 16th century, they had become a kinship group in which all its members bore the same surname of Oliver.
