= Inverness Castle =

Castle in Inverness, Highland, Scotland

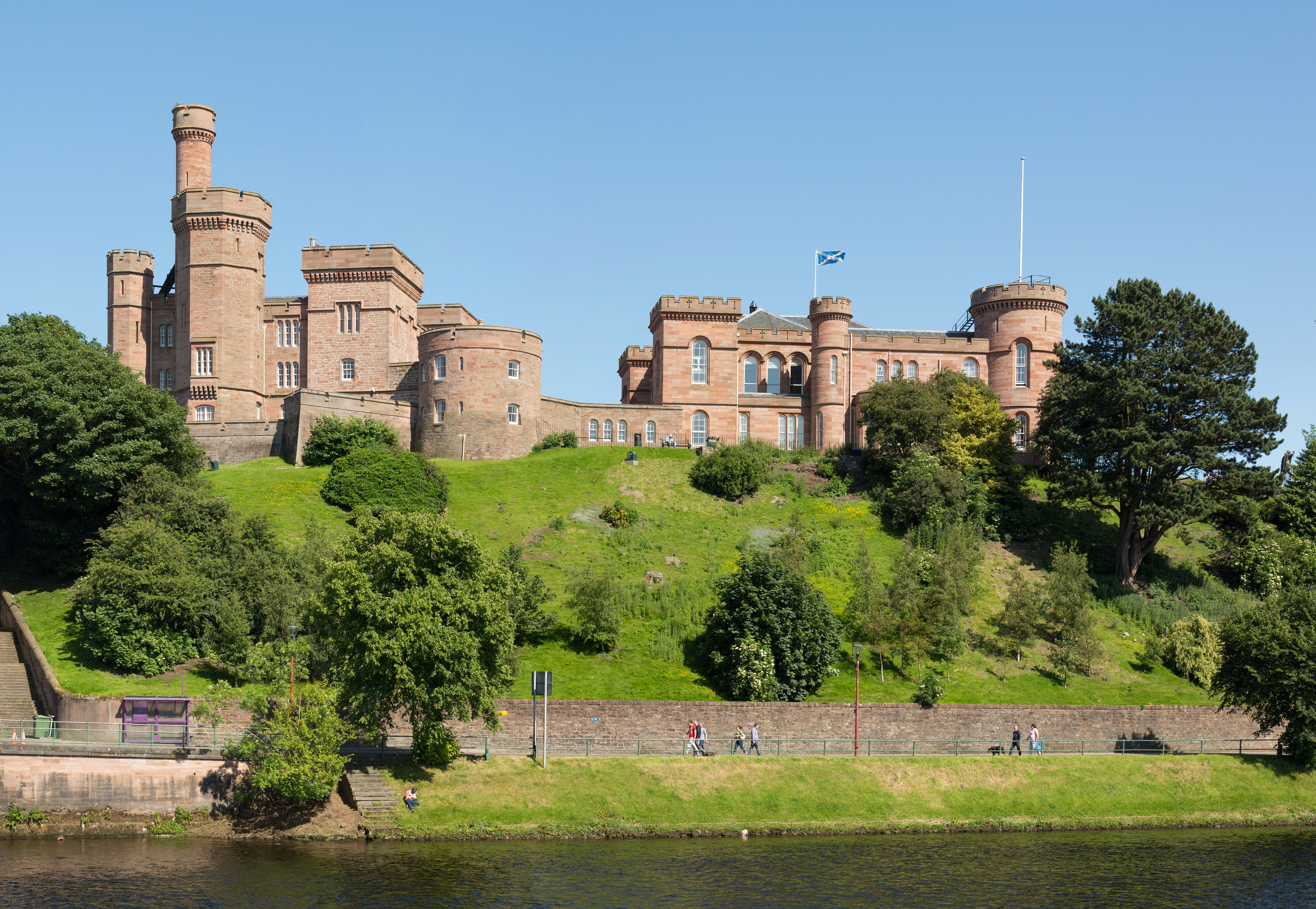
- Inverness Castle
- Interactive map of Inverness Castle
- 57.4764°N 4.2254°W
- Location: Inverness, Highland, Scotland

History
- Built: 1836

Site notes
- Architect(s): William Burn (south block); Thomas Brown II (north block); Joseph Mitchell (enclosing walls)

Listed Building – Category A
- Official name: Inverness Sheriff Court and Justice of the Peace Court, including Police Station and boundary wall, Castle Wynd, Castle Hill, Inverness
- Reference no.: LB35166

Inverness Castle (Scottish Gaelic: Caisteal Inbhir Nis) is a castle overlooking the River Ness in Inverness, Highland, Scotland. A succession of castles has occupied the site since 1057, although the present red sandstone structure was completed in 1836 to designs by William Burn and later extended by Thomas Brown II. Originally serving as the sheriff court and administrative centre for Inverness-shire, the castle is a Category A listed building.

== History ==
=== Medieval history ===
A succession of castles have stood on this site since 1057. The castle is said to have been built by Malcolm III of Scotland (Máel Coluim mac Donnchada). The first chief of Clan Mackintosh, Shaw Macduff is said to have been appointed constable of Inverness Castle by Malcolm IV in 1163 after assisting the king in putting down a rebellion in Moray. The first Inverness Castle was partially destroyed (slighted) by King Robert I of Scotland in 1307 who razed its battlements to the ground.

In 1428, James I, in his effort to bring the Highlanders to heel, summoned fifty clan chiefs to a parley at Inverness Castle. However, "where the Parliament was at the time sitting, they were one by one by order of the King arrested, ironed, and imprisoned in different apartments and debarred from having any communications with each other or with their followers." Several chiefs were executed on the spot. Among those arrested were Alexander, 3rd Lord of the Isles, and his mother, Mariota, Countess of Ross. Lord Alexander remained imprisoned for twelve months, after which he returned to Inverness with 10,000 men and burnt the town, though he failed to take the Castle.

The castle was occupied during the Raid on Ross in 1491. Walter Ogilvy was paid in February 1498 for repairing the two "gemmel" towers of Inverness Castle. A "gemmel" is a pair. In February 1509 James IV made Alexander Gordon, 3rd Earl of Huntly hereditary keeper of the castle and sheriff of Inverness.

=== Mary, Queen of Scots ===
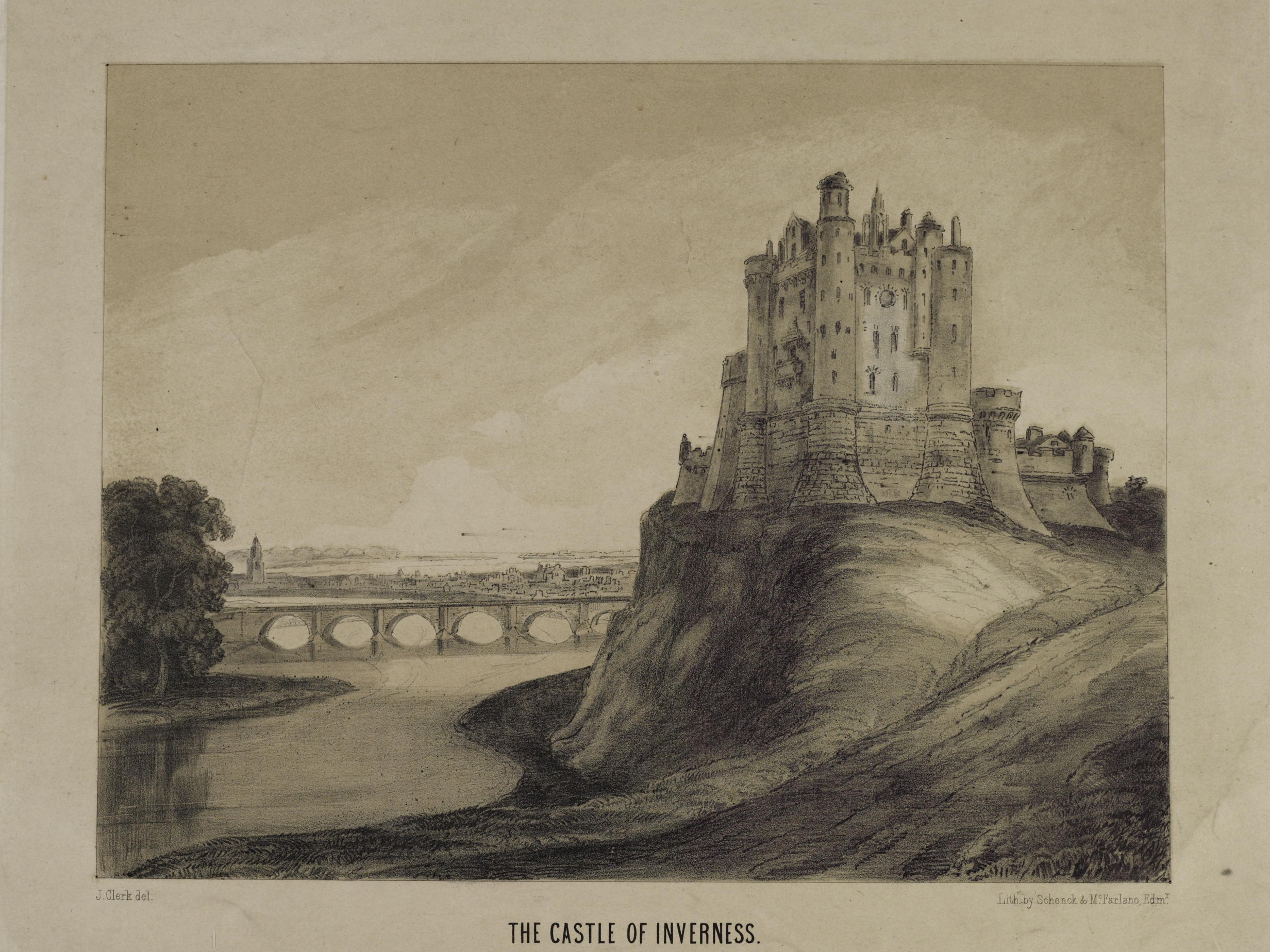
Historic view of Inverness Castle

In 1548 another castle with tower was completed by George Gordon, 4th Earl of Huntly (1514–1562). Huntly had been obliged to build a hall and chapel at the castle by James V and Margaret Tudor in connection with his marriage to Elizabeth Keith in 1530. Huntly was constable of the castle until 1562. Mary of Guise, Regent of Scotland, came to Inverness in August 1556 to hold justice courts.

When Mary, Queen of Scots, came on progress to Inverness in August 1562, she was refused entry by the powerful Gordon family, who were subsequently ejected from the castle by the Clan Chattan, Clan Munro, and Clan Fraser. According to George Buchanan's account of events, when the Queen found the gates of Inverness Castle shut against her, the Frasers and Munros came to her aid. These two clans took Inverness Castle for the Queen. The Queen later hanged the governor, a Gordon who had refused entry. George Buchanan wrote in Latin:

Audito Principis periculo magna Priscorum Scotorum multitudo partim excita partim sua sponte afferit, imprimis Fraserie et Munoroii hominum fortissimorum in illis gentibus familiae

When they heard of their Sovereign's danger a great multitude of the ancient Scots poured in around her of their own volition, especially the Frasers and Munros, who were esteemed the most valiant families among those clans.

Mary, Queen of Scots came back to Inverness in September 1562. She travelled from Aberdeen. She crossed the River Spey at Boharm by ferry boat. The boat cost 40 shillings and her almoner gave money to the poor folk in Boharm. There was a wayside Hospital dedicated to St Nicholas at Boat o'Brig in Boharm, a Spey crossing where there had formerly been a wooden bridge. While she was in Inverness, she bought gunpowder and 15 tartan plaids for her lackeys and members of her household. Mary moved on to Speyside escorted by "captains of the Highland men", whose service cost £313-6s-8d Scots.

George Munro of Davochgartie and Milntown, who had helped organise Mary's journey, was made keeper of Inverness Castle. Robert Mor Munro, 15th Baron of Foulis, chief of the Clan Munro, was a staunch supporter and faithful friend of Mary Queen of Scots and was consequently treated favourably by her son James VI. In December 1562, Mary gave orders for George Munro to resign the keeping of the castle to John Ross, the Provost of Inverness.

In response to the Chaseabout Raid, Mary, Queen of Scots and Lord Darnley appointed Hucheon Rose of Kilravock keeper of the castle on 22 September 1565. He was to replace George Monro and his son Andrew. In October it was decided the Earl of Huntly should be keeper again.

=== Other sieges of Inverness Castle ===
There were later sieges of Inverness in 1562, 1649, 1650, 1689, 1715 and 1746.

In August 1583, King James VI ordered the imprisonment of John Leslie of Balquhain, Andrew Munro of Newmoir, and William Douglas of Lochleven in Inverness Castle, each were allowed six servants.

In May 1619 it was reported that Inverness Castle was in a poor state, and "a great part thereof was quite fallen down". King James wrote from Theobalds to the Earl of Mar and Gideon Murray with orders that the castle should be repaired as soon as priority works at Linlithgow Palace and Dumbarton Castle were completed. James thought that "although it may be that we in our own time shall never see it, much less dwell therein, yet may some of our successors take occasion to remain there". The castle was not repaired at this time.

=== Current structure ===
The current structure was built on the site of the original castle. The red sandstone structure, displaying an early castellated style, is the work of a few 19th-century architects. The main (southern), which incorporated the old County Buildings including the Sheriff Court, was designed by William Burn (1789–1870) in an early castellated, built in red sandstone and completed in 1836. The north block, which was originally used as a prison and later used as an additional courthouse, was designed by Thomas Brown II (1806–c. 1872) in a similar style, also built in red sandstone and was completed in 1848. Meanwhile, Joseph Mitchell (1803–1883) designed the bastioned enclosing walls. The design of the main building involved a symmetrical main frontage of seven bays facing south. The central section of three bays, which slightly projected forward, involved a round headed doorway flanked by round headed windows on the ground floor, three round headed windows on the first floor and a battlement above. The outer bays took the form of castellated towers, the left-hand tower being round and the right-hand tower being square.

In 1920, the castle frontage was adorned by four field guns, a field gun captured by the 5th Battalion Queen's Own Cameron Highlanders at the Battle of Loos on 25 September 1915, a Bronze field piece captured by the 7th Battalion Queen's Own Cameron Highlanders at an unknown battle in France, and a pair of Russian field guns captured after the Siege of Sevastopol during the Crimean War of 1855, which were gifted to Inverness after the Treaty of Paris in 1857. In 1941, to assist with the war effort during the Second World War, the Russian guns were sold off to Williamson & Co., a scrap dealer from Elgin, for £25. However due to an error, the 7th Battalion gun was taken away instead of one of the Sevastopol guns, and was scrapped before anyone became aware of the error, with the compensation for it going into the Comfort for the Camerons fund, and the remaining Sevastopol gun returning to the front of the castle, before being moved inside the castle until the second courtroom was built in the 1970s. As of 2017, only the gun from the Battle of Loos survives and is on display at the Clan Cameron Museum in Achnacarry.

Following the implementation of the Local Government (Scotland) Act 1889, which established county councils in every county, the new county leaders needed to identify a meeting place for Inverness-shire County Council and duly arranged to meet in the courthouse. After Inverness-shire County Council moved to its new headquarters in Glenurquhart Road in 1963, the building continued to serve a judicial function, being used for hearings of the sheriff's court and, on one day a month, for hearings of the justice of the peace court. However, hearings of the Inverness Sheriff Court were moved to the Inverness Justice Centre on 30 March 2020.

Due to extensive renovation and remodelling the castle and grounds were closed to the public in 2021. The site re-opened to the public in 2025 following a transformation project costing around £47 million. The revamp included the creation of an Inverness Castle Experience featuring an interactive journey through Highland history and culture.

In August 2026 papers released by the Highland Council revealed that the new attraction had made a loss of £1.6 million in its first year due to lower than expected visitor numbers.

== £50 note ==
An illustration of the castle has featured on the reverse side of a £50 note issued by the Royal Bank of Scotland, which was introduced in 2005.

== In popular culture ==
Inverness Castle is one of the main settings in William Shakespeare's tragedy, Macbeth. The castle is the residence of Macbeth and Lady Macbeth at the start of the play, and the site of King Duncan's murder.

== See also ==
- Banknotes of Scotland (featured on design)
- Sonnencroft
- North Coast 500, a scenic route which starts and ends at the castle
