= Iain Lom =

Scottish Gaelic poet

John MacDonald, known as Iain Lom (c. 1624–c. 1710) was a poet and tacksman of Allt a' Chaorainn from Clan MacDonald of Keppoch, who composed in Scottish Gaelic. He was appointed by King Charles II as his poet laureate,

== Biography ==
Iain Lom's family were of minor nobility (Scottish Gaelic: flath) within Clan MacDonald of Keppoch. In Gaelic Scotland, since there might often be a number of men with the same first names in any given clan, they were given sobriquets which might be based on a peculiar characteristic or feature. "Lom" is Scots Gaelic for "bald" or "bare" (lom a., comparative form luime, bare, bald, shaven, cropped), perhaps indicating he was bald. However, in Gaelic idiom, it can also mean one who is very plain-spoken, an idiom which perhaps can best be related in English to the term "bare-faced" (though this is now generally applied only to liars). He was also known as Iain Manntach which translates as "Stammering John," perhaps from a speech impediment.

His family held land as tacksmen at Allt a' Chaorainn, near the present day Laggan Dam. A ruined blackhouse near the road is said in the local oral tradition to have been Iain Lom's house.

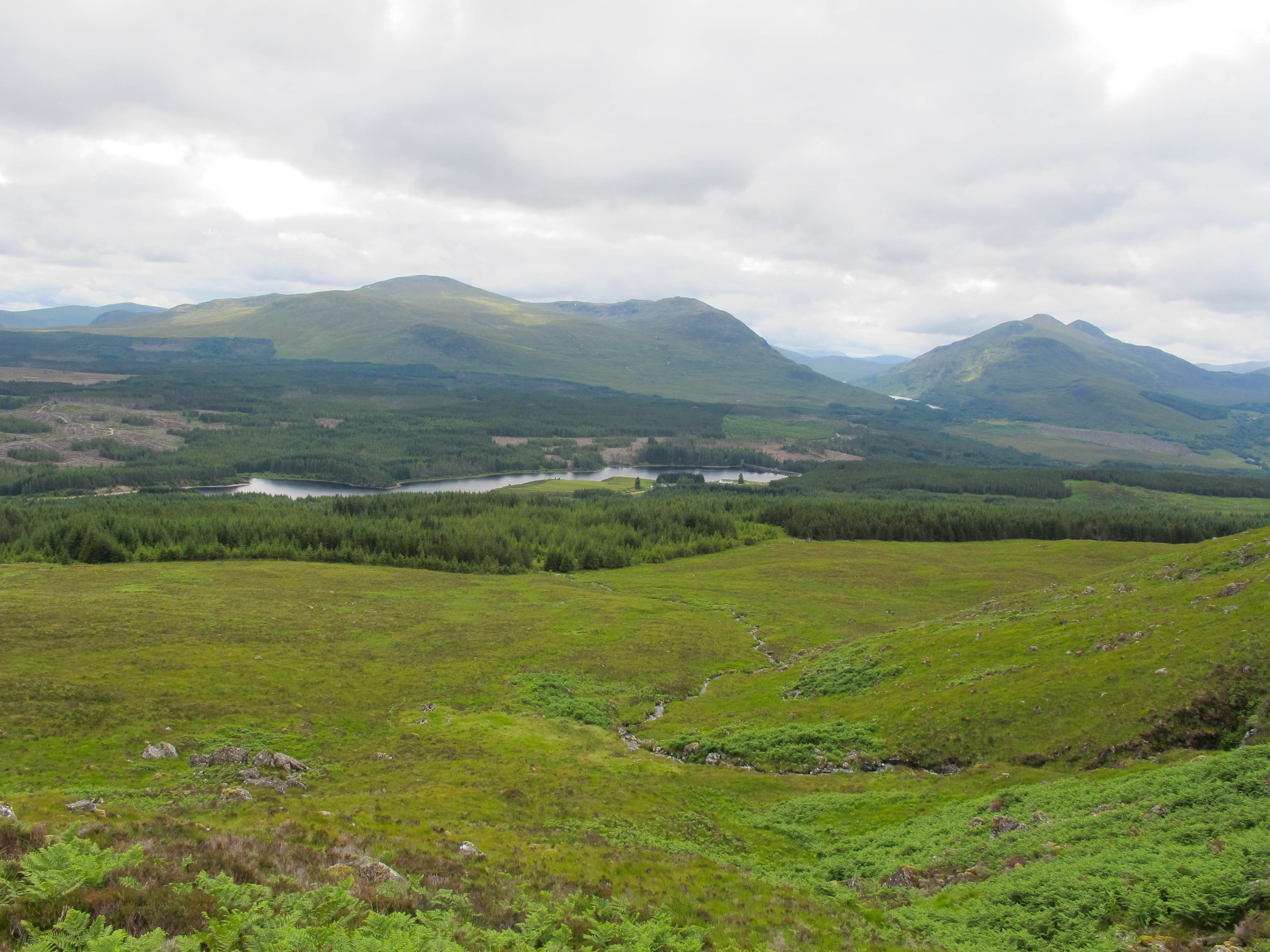
Looking down to Laggan Dam and Iain Lom's home at Allt a' Chaorainn.

His dates of birth and death are unknown, but we know that he was present at (and composed a song about) the 1645 Battle of Inverlochy as an adult, and the Treaty of Union (1707); this would presume a birthdate in the early-mid-1620s (if not earlier), and a death in the early 18th century. Most of the few details we have of his life are known from contemporary comments, and from his poetry.

There is a tradition that he attended the Royal Scots College at Valladolid in Spain as a youth and was expelled for some failing or indiscretion. Some suggest that Lom maybe a reference to a tonsure.

He was apparently somewhat disabled, and was once described by a contemporary as "walking with a hirple" (i.e., a limp) This, however, is at odds with the tradition that it was Iain Lom who walked from Lochaber to Cille Chumein (now renamed Fort Augustus) to warn Montrose of the arrival of Argyll at Inverlochy Castle and then guided the royalist army up Glen Turret and over the snow-covered hills into Glen Roy to surprise Argyll at Inverlochy on 2 February 1645. John Buchan described this as "that flank march which is one of the great exploits in the history of British arms". Montrose's own son died a month later as a result of this desperate march. It is believed that Iain Lom accidentally killed his own brother at a skirmish on Loch Tayside (Sròn a’ Chlachain), a battle in which their father was also killed. Thereafter, he refused to draw a sword. When offered one by Alasdair Mac Colla at Inverlochy he politely declined by saying "Cathaichibh sibhse 's innse mise" (You fight and I'll narrate). His long narrative war poem Là Inbhir Lochaidh ("The Day of Inverlochy") is regarded as one of the great treasures of Scottish Gaelic literature and is an important historical source regarding the battle.

His supposed lameness didn't stop him from climbing a tree during the battle of Inverlochy. When chastised for his seeming cowardice by his chief afterwards, he is said to have replied that he had climbed the tree the better to see his chief and clansmens' deeds, and had he risked being been killed, who would have composed a poem about their victory?

There are many stories told of his quick and vitriolic wit, which apparently was demonstrated from an early age. He was a man of strong passions, none of which exceeded his hatred of Clan Campbell, as is evident from the following from Là Inbhir Lochaidh (The Day of Inverlochy)

Sgrios oirbh mas truagh leam bhur càramh
G eisteachd anshocair bhur paisdean
Caoidh a’ phannail a bh’anns an araich
Donnalaich bhan Earra-Ghàidheal.

Translation:

Destruction on you if I feel pity for your plight
listening to the distress of your children
lamenting the company which was in the battlefield
The wailing of the Argyll women.

He was appointed poet laureate to King Charles II in Scotland.

Iain Lom was almost single-handedly responsible for bringing those responsible for the 1663 Keppoch murders to justice. When Dòmhnall Glas II (Grey Donald II) died, his heir Alasdair was too young to rule. The clan was governed by Alasdair Buidhe (yellow-haired Alexander), uncle to the heir, as regent until the young chief and his brother, Raghnall, returned from their education in Rome. A banquet was held in their honour at which both boys were murdered by 7 men (Alexander MacDonald, the Keppoch Tacksman of Inverlair, and his six sons) who then, with the support of other tacksmen, seized the chieftainship of Keppoch for themselves.

Even though Alexander MacDonald of Inverlair was married to his sister, Iain Lom appealed to Clan MacDonald of Glengarry for justice but was ignored and achieved nothing. He accordingly had to flee into exile and appealed to Sir James, of Clan MacDonald of Sleat for the authority to avenge the murder. Letters of fire and sword were finally granted to Iain Lom in 1665. The guilty parties were surprised at a house near Inverlair, where Iain Lom is said in the oral tradition to have personally decapitated all seven assassins with the very sword they had used to slay the Keppoch heirs. Iain Lom then showed all 7 heads to the chief of Glengarry, as a public rebuke for his earlier refusal to follow the code of conduct. On his way he stopped at Loch Oich side and washed the heads at Tobar nan Ceann (The Well of the Heads) where a monument was later erected. He versified the story in Murt na Ceapaich (The Keppoch murders)

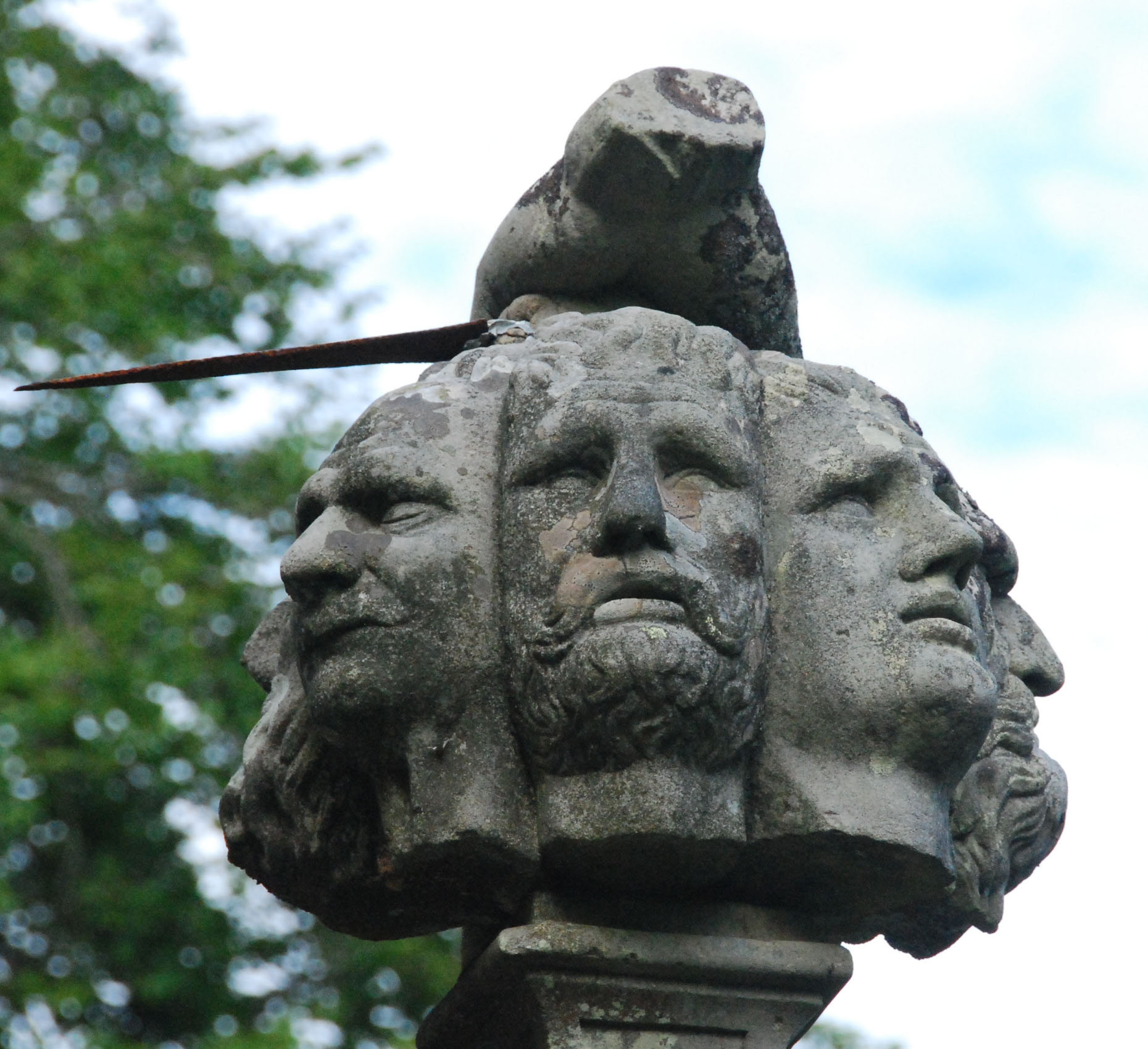
Detail of monument at Tobar nan Ceann

Iain Lom is also believed to have been present at the Battle of Killiecrankie in 1689, when he would have been in his mid-sixties. Two poems about the battle are attributed to him although it has been suggested that one of these may have been written by his son. Cath Raon Ruairidh, the Gaelic name for Killiecrankie, is cited as evidence that Viscount Dundee was shot just below his breast plate, and not, as later suggested by Professor Terry, through his left eye. Iain Lom dismissed William of Orange as "a borrowed king" and condemned Queen Mary for showing disloyalty to her father. The Massacre of Glencoe was also roundly condemned in Gaelic verse in Murt Ghlinne Comhann. Iain Lom's suggested punishment for the betrayal of the code of conduct represented by the murder of his MacDonald relatives by guests in their own household was that Clan Campbell in its entirety should be attainded, similarly to Clan MacGregor, and their lands granted to Clan Donald. In Òran an Aghaidh an Aonaidh (A Song Against the Union), he roundly condemned those members of the Scottish nobility who had voted for the Act of Union 1707. This is regarded as the last work that can be attributed to him and it is assumed that his death must have been soon afterwards.

== Work ==
Iain Lom is representative of a switch from the ancient, classical tradition of Gaelic poetry to the vernacular poetry of the 17th century and later. Classical bards wrote mainly praise poems to their clan chiefs in the Classical Gaelic literary language that Scotland had once shared with Gaelic Ireland. While Iain Lom's work continues many features of the classical tradition, including the syllabic metrical rules of Dán Díreach, he wrote in the everyday Gaelic vernacular of his time. A thoroughly political poet, he was a fierce opponent of the English Puritans and the Scottish Covenanters. Later he opposed the accession of William of Orange and later governments. He remained a loyal devotee of the House of Stuart, and thus was an early Jacobite. As a clan bard, he commented on the battles and engagements the Keppoch clan engaged in while campaigning for the Stuarts, especially under Great Montrose, as well as on contemporary matters. His known works include the following:

- The Battle of Inverlochy
- Alasdair MacColla
- Keppoch murders
- The Massacre of Glencoe (in which MacDonald kinsmen were killed)
- The Restoration
- The Hanoverian succession
- Act of Union 1707 which removed Scottish sovereignty.

== Family ==
Even though Iain Lom's sister who was married to Keppoch Murders mastermind Alexander MacDonald of Inverlair, the Bard seems to have remained on good terms with his sister even after widowing her. While W.T. Kilgour says that he never married others say that he had a son, a good poet in his own right, who was killed in a skirmish at High Bridge in Glen Spean by Dòmhnall Donn (Brown haired Donald) of Bohuntine, a bard with family ties to the Keppoch Murderers. This is reportedly why, when Dòmhnall Donn, who was a famous cattle raider, was awaiting execution in Inverness, Iain Lom, as a man of great influence, made no move to help him.

== Burial ==
Iain Lom is said in the local oral tradition to lie buried in the churchyard of Cille Choiril, just east of Roybridge and near his home at Allt a' Chaorainn. The exact location of his grave is unknown but Charles Fraser-Mackintosh erected a fine memorial stone there to him in the late 19th century.

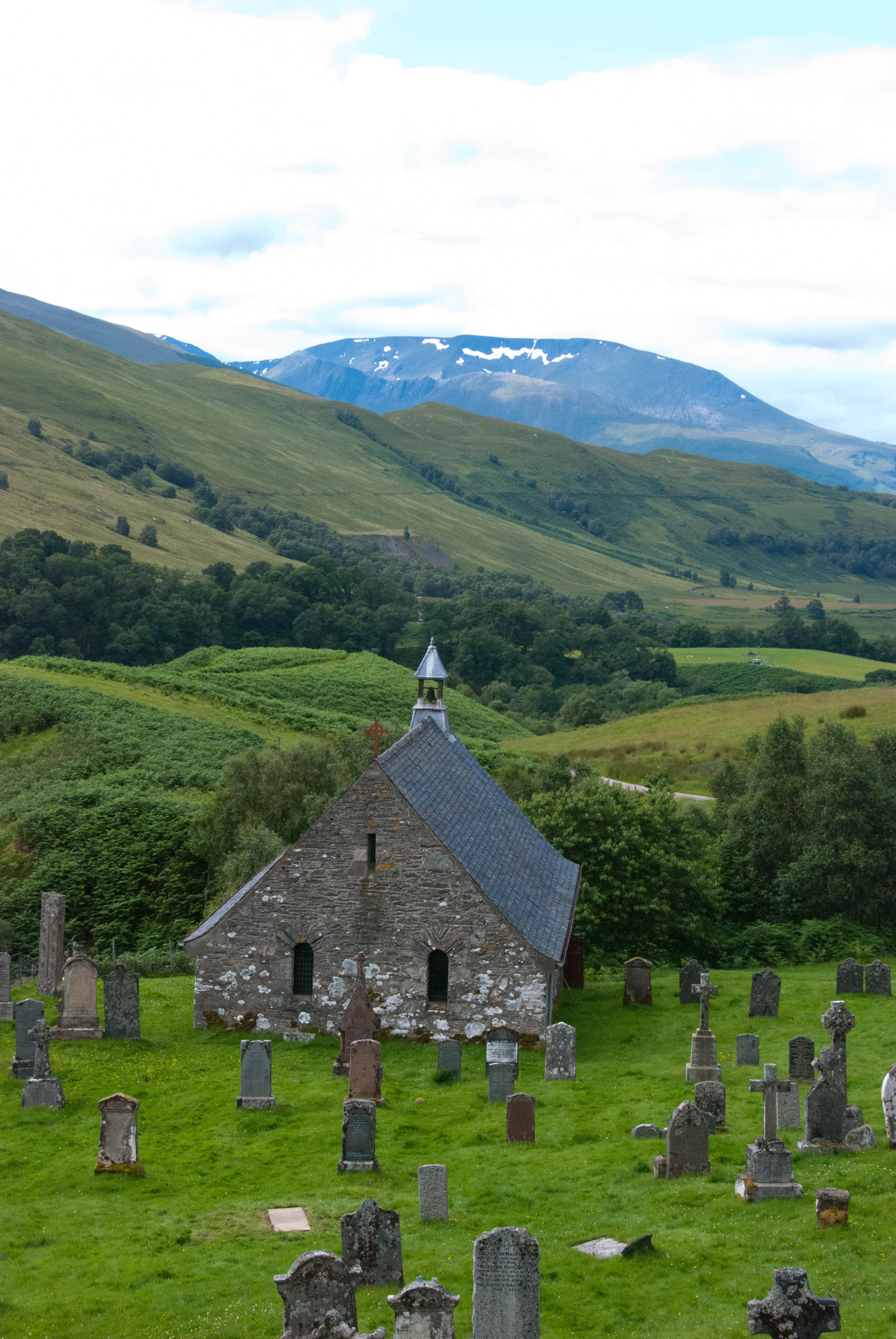
Cille Choiril churchyard where Iain Lom is said to be buried

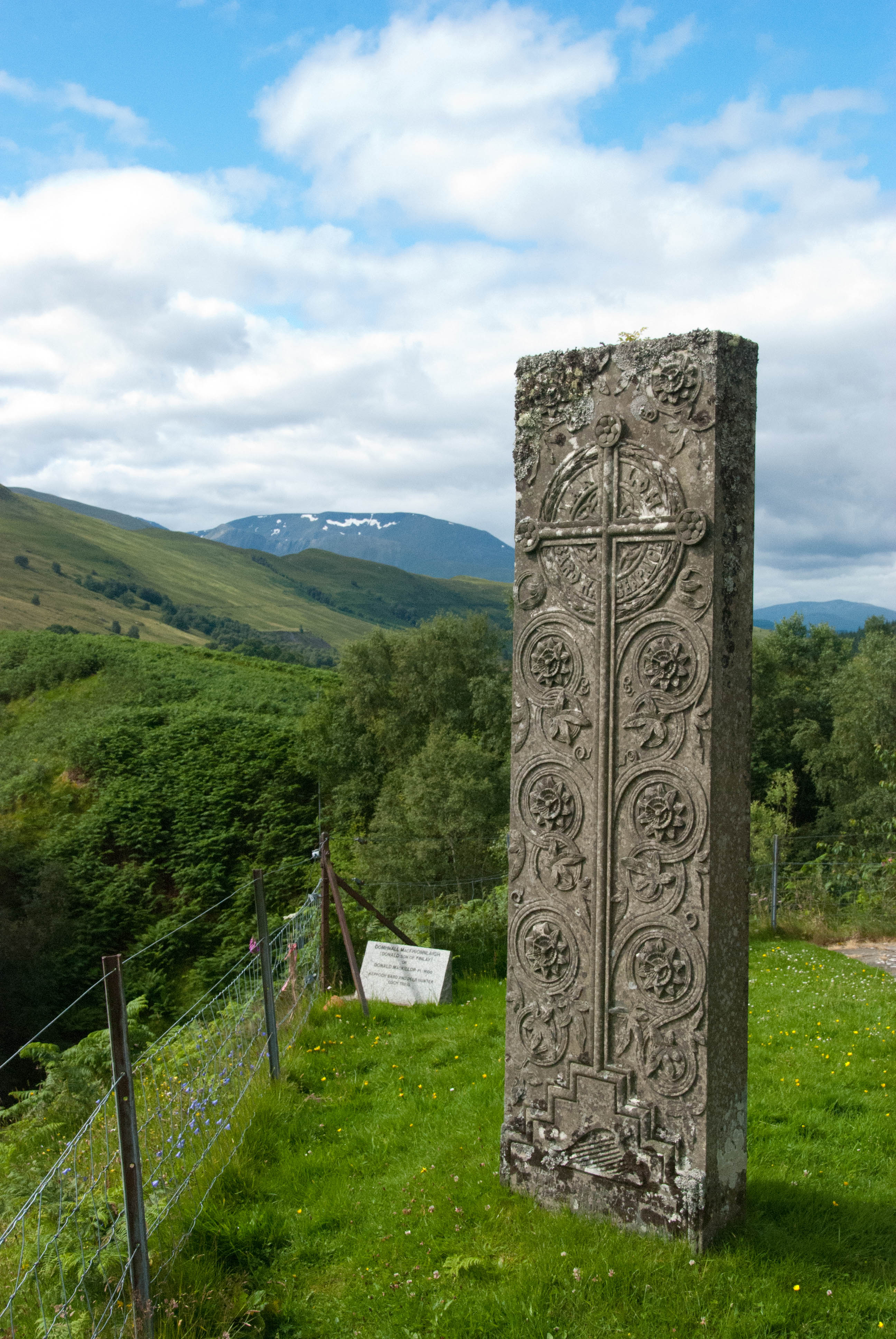
Monument to Iain Lom at Cille Choiril

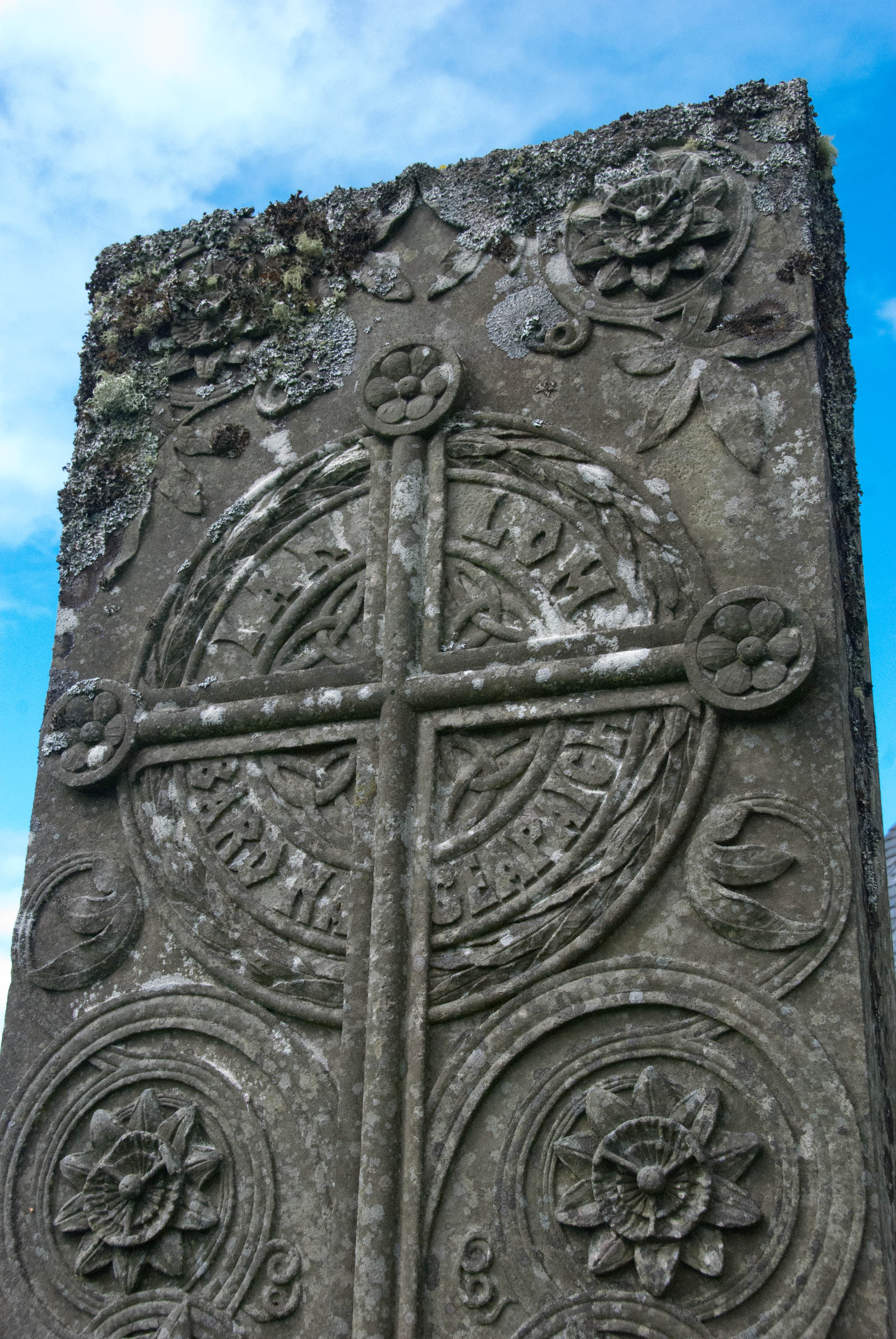
Detail of Ian Lom's monument

== In fiction ==
Iain Lom features as a character in Neil Munro's novel of the Little Wars of Lorn, John Splendid (1898).
