= Clan MacDonald of Keppoch =

Highland Scottish clan

- Clann Dòmhnaill na Ceapaich, Clann Mhic Raghnaill na Ceapaich
- Crest: An eagle displayed, Gules, crowned of a ducal coronet, Or
- Motto: Air Muir's Air Tir (By Sea and By Land)
- War cry: Dia 's Naomh Aindrea! (God and St Andrew!)

Profile
- Region: Scottish Highlands
- District: Lochaber
- Plant badge: Common Heath

Chief
- Kenneth Donald MacDonald
- The 23rd Chief of the Clan Ranald of Lochaber (Mac Mhic Raonuill)
- Seat: Keppoch House
- Historic seat: Keppoch Castle
Septs of Clan MacDonald of Keppoch
Burke, Boyle, Kelly, Kennedy, MacGillivantic, MacGilp, MacGlasrich, MacKerracher, MacKillop, MacPhilip, Philipson, Ronald, Ronaldson
Clan branches
MacDonalds of Bohuntine
MacDonalds of Tulloch
MacDonalds of Aberarder
MacDonalds of Achnancoichean
MacDonalds of Clianaig
MacDonalds of Cranachan
MacDonalds of Dalchosnie
MacDonalds of Fersit
MacDonalds of Gellovie
MacDonalds of Inch
MacDonalds of Inverroy
MacDonalds of Killiechonate
MacDonalds of Murlagan
MacDonalds of Tirnadris
MacDonalds of Tullochrom
Allied clans
Clan Cameron (17th-18th centuries)
Clan Stewart (17th-18th centuries)
Rival clans
Clan Campbell
Clan Mackintosh
Clan Cameron (16th-17th centuries)
Clan MacLaren
Clan Stewart of Appin

Clan MacDonald of Keppoch, also known as Clan MacDonell of Keppoch or Clan Ranald of Lochaber (Scottish Gaelic: Clann Dòmhnaill na Ceapaich [ˈkʰl̪ˠãũn̪ˠ ˈt̪õː.ɪʎ nə ˈkʲʰɛʰpɪç]), is a Highland Scottish clan and a branch of Clan Donald. The progenitor of the clan is Alistair Carrach MacDonald, 4th great-grandson of the warrior Somerled. The clan chief is traditionally designated as the "Son of Ranald's son" (Scottish Gaelic: Mac Mhic Raonuill).

Clan MacDonald of Keppoch has a chief that is recognized by the Court of the Lord Lyon, and the Lord Lyon King of Arms, who is the heraldic authority in Scotland.

== History of the MacDonalds of Keppoch ==
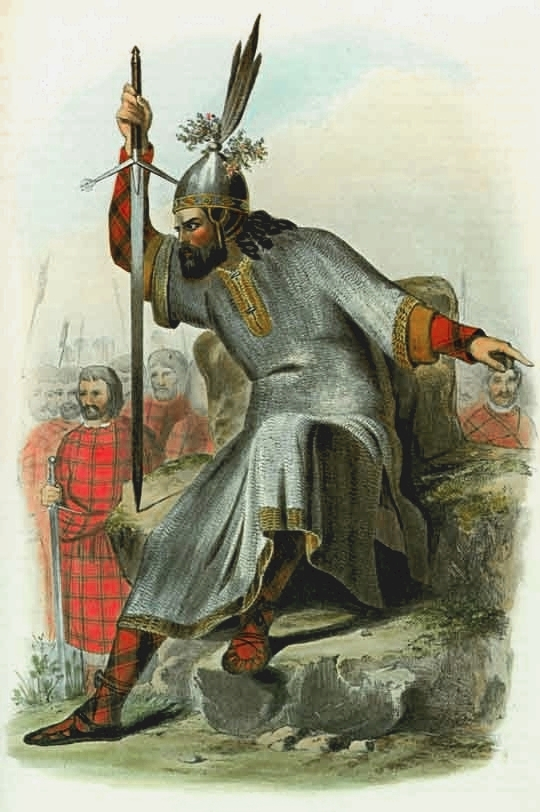
R.R. McIan's Victorian era romanticised depiction of a Macdonald, lord of the Isles.

=== Origins ===
The MacDonalds of Keppoch are one of the branch clans of Clan Donald—one of the largest Scottish clans. The eponymous ancestor of Clan Donald is Donald, son of Reginald, son of Somerled. Somerled, son of Gillebride was a 12th-century Norse–Gaelic leader and warrior who was called "King of the Isles" and "King of Argyll". Through marital alliance and ambitious military conquest, Somerled rose in prominence to create the Kingdom of Mann and the Isles. Traditional genealogies suggest Somerled is a descendant of various Irish legendary figures and may have had a Norse mother. Historians and scholars, however, are skeptical and dubious of Somerled's genealogical royal origins, nor the credibility of Somerled's eventual rise to power.

Lochaber was one of the many territories that Robert the Bruce gifted to his friend, Aonghus Óg of Islay, who fought alongside Bruce during the First War of Scottish Independence, including the successful Battle of Bannockburn in 1314. Aonghus Óg's loyalty to Bruce's claim for the Scottish crown and the extensive military services he provided would signify a lasting legacy, in which he and his descendants were known as the Lords of the Isles.

The MacDonalds of Keppoch are descended from Alistair Carrach MacDonald who was a younger son of Good John of Islay, Lord of the Isles, 6th chief of Clan Donald and his second wife Margaret Stewart, daughter of King Robert II of Scotland. John of Islay, Lord of the Isles, apportioned his estates between the children of his two marriages in accordance with the marriage settlement of his father-in-law Robert II of Scotland and the Lordship of Lochaber was given to Alistair Carrach MacDonald who was the third and youngest son from his second marriage. Alistair Carrach MacDonald was the first MacDonald of Keppoch and Garragach. The MacDonalds of Keppoch occupied the Keppoch and Lochaber territories between Loch Linnhe and Loch Leven and the mountains of Glen Roy and Glen Spean, which are located in Inverness-shire near Spean Bridge.

=== 15th century ===
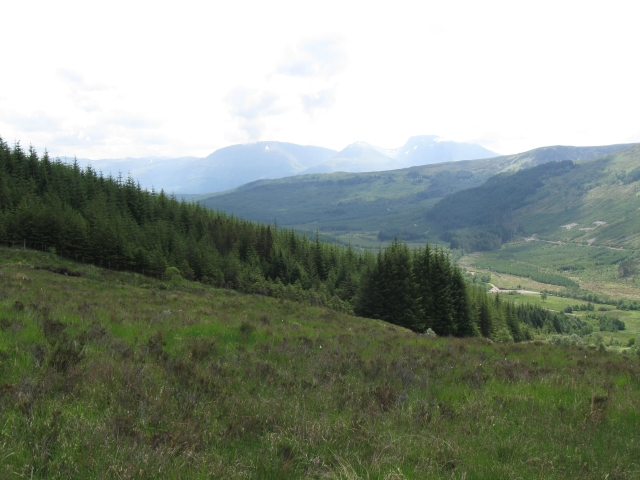
The MacDonalds of Keppoch resided in the lands of Lochaber in the Scottish Highlands.

Alistair Carrach MacDonald of Keppoch supported his brother, Domhnall of Islay, in his claim to the Earldom of Ross. After Domhnall’s death in 1425, the Lordship of Lochaber was forfeited to the Crown and briefly granted to the Earl of Mar’s natural son, then transferred to the Lord of the Isles. He granted Lochaber to Clan Mackintosh with royal approval, while retaining superiority and restoring it to Alistair, an arrangement never confirmed by the Crown. When the Lordship of the Isles was forfeited in 1493, the MacDonalds of Keppoch held Lochaber by force for the next 250 years, until their final defeat after Culloden in 1746, when Mackintosh became Lord of Lochaber.

Angus of Fersit, 4th of Laird of Keppoch succeeded as chief. During the mid-15th century, Angus and his followers supported John of Islay, Earl of Ross, in his 1451 rising alongside the House of Douglas. The Keppoch men joined in the capture of Urquhart Castle and Inverness Castle, and the demolition of Ruthven Castle. In 1455, Angus participated in a naval expedition to the Firth of Clyde led by Donald Balloch of Islay, in further support of the Lord of the Isles. In 1463, Angus witnessed a charter granted by John, Earl of Ross, at Dingwall, where he is styled “Angus Alexandri de Insulis.” He is believed to have died at Fersit on an unknown date.

In the early 1480s, Donald Angusson, 3rd Laird of Keppoch, fought beside Aonghas Óg MacDonald against John of Islay at the Battle of Bloody Bay, where Aonghas Óg was victorious. After the Lordship of the Isles was forfeited in 1493, Donald briefly submitted to James IV at Mingary Castle, but soon defied the Crown and lost his lands in 1497. That same year, Donald Angusson led Clan MacDonald of Keppoch to defeat the Clan Stewart of Appin and the Clan MacLaren at the Battle of Black Mount in which both the chiefs of Appin and Keppoch were killed.

Donald was succeeded by Iain Aluinn, 4th of Keppoch, whose short rule angered his clansmen when he surrendered a thief, Domhnull Ruadh Beag, to the Mackintosh chief—longtime enemies—leading to the thief’s execution. His authority collapsed, and the clan chose Alexander, grandson of Alistair Carrach, who was soon killed in an ambush. His son, Donald Glass, later restored stability and built the first Castle Keppoch in Lochaber.

=== 16th century ===
Ranald Mor, 7th Chief of Keppoch, supported John Moidartach in the Clan Ranald succession dispute and fought beside him at the Battle of the Shirts, where nearly all the MacDonalds and Frasers of Lovat were killed. In response to Lord Lovat’s death, the Earl of Huntly ravaged the lands of Keppoch and Lochiel but failed to capture Ranald Mor. In 1547, however, Ranald Mor, Lochiel, and their followers were seized by William Mackintosh and handed over to Huntly. Ranald Mor was tried and executed that same year for his role in Lovat’s death. His wife—sister of the Mackintosh chief—was said to have cursed her own family so that no Mackintosh son would ever succeed his father as chief.

After Ranald Mor’s death, Keppoch chiefs adopted the style “MacRanald,” later formalized as Mac Mhic Raonuill (“son of Ranald’s son”), which became the traditional designation for future chiefs of Clan Keppoch.

=== 17th century ===
Alexander nan Cleas, 8th Chief of Keppoch, briefly succeeded Ranald Mor and gained a reputation as a sorcerer and committed several violent crimes. He celebrated his accession with a raid, attacking lands of Urquhart, Glen Shee and Strathardle, later receiving a royal reprieve. Under Alexander’s leadership, a major clash occurred with the neighbouring Clan Cameron at the Battle of Boloinne in February 1554, where the Camerons’ leader was killed and Alexander was fatally wounded and later died. He was succeeded by his brother, Ranald Og.

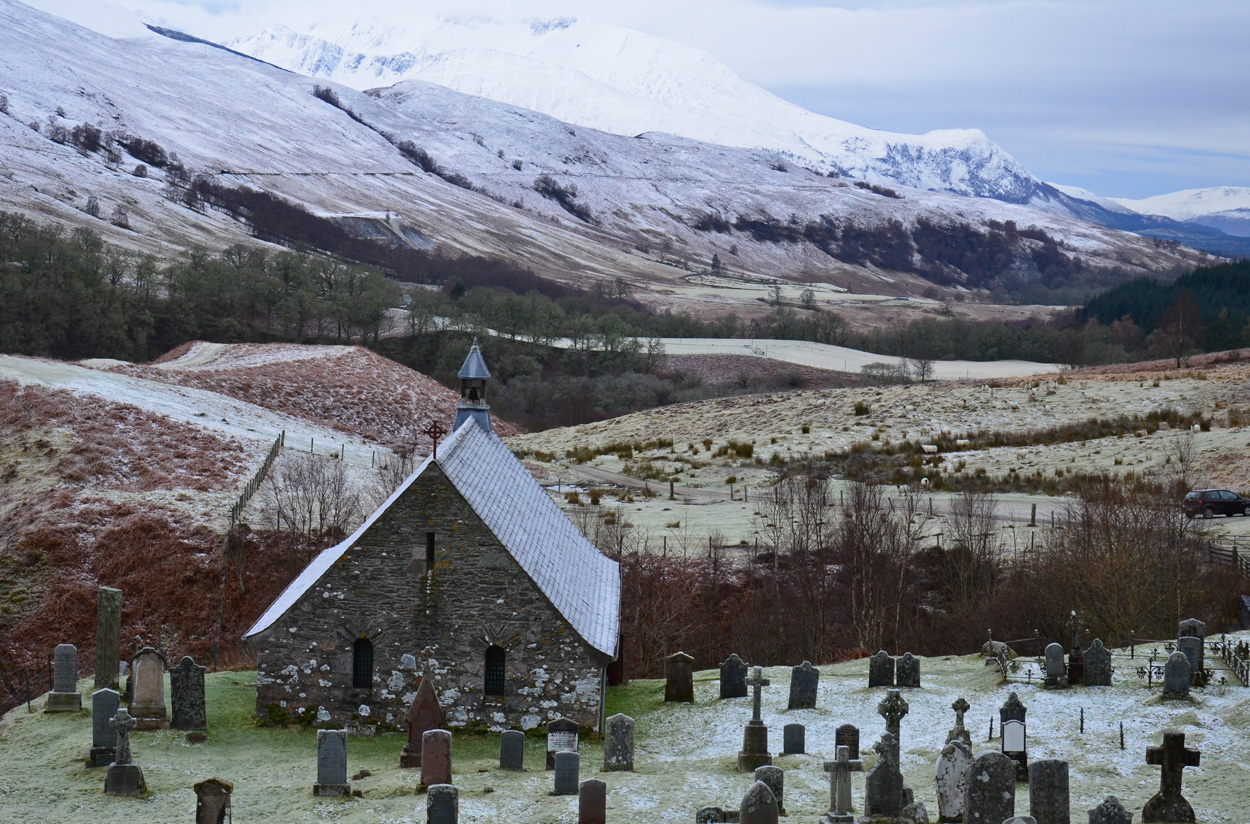
For centuries, Cille Choirill church has been the ancestral burial place of the MacDonells of Keppoch, many of whose monuments still survive. The famous warrior-bard Ian Lom Macdonald who died in 1709 is said to lie here, although the tall beautiful carved stone commemorating him does not mark the actual grave.

After helping Sir James MacDonald, 9th of Dunnyveg escape from Edinburgh Castle, Ranald Og fled to Spain, returning only when he supplied James VI and I with intelligence on a planned Spanish invasion. He was pardoned, granted a pension, and lived peacefully thereafter. Ranald Og proved loyal to the Crown and allied with Clan Campbell and the Earl of Moray, but this led to conflict with the Earl of Argyll, who destroyed Castle Keppoch. Ranald’s brother, Donald Glass, who eventually succeeded him in chieftainship, retaliated by raiding Argyll.

For centuries, the chiefs of Keppoch were buried at Cille Choirill, also associated with the Keppoch bard and poet Iain Lom. On 25 September 1663, seven men fell upon Alexander MacDonald, 12th of Keppoch and his brother Ranald and murdered them during a brawl in the mansion of Insch, just outside the village of Roybridge, Lochaber. The identity of the killers, Alexander MacDonald, Keppoch Tacksman of Inverlair, and his six sons, were well known. The cause of the murders were a manner of rival claimants to the chieftainship of Clan MacDonald of Keppoch. Iain Lom appealed for revenge before Lord Glengarry, but found apathy to the request. The seven killers were eventually hunted down and killed two years later by men sent by MacDonald of Sleat. Iain Lom brought the severed heads to Invergarry Castle in order to show them to Lord MacDonell of Glengarry, who had failed to bring the murderers to justice. This event became known as the Keppoch murders.

Noted in the Black-book of Taymouth that in 1681 a bond of manrent was given by Gilleasba, chief of Keppoch, to John Glas, first Earl of Breadalbane; "such as Ceppoch's predecessors gave to the Earl's predecessors." binding Keppoch "to restrain all the inhabitants of Brae-Lochaber, and all of the name of Macdonell, from committing robberies within the Earl's bounds." Coll MacDonald, 16th of Keppoch, later renewed the Keppoch feud with Clan Mackintosh, culminating in the Battle of Mulroy in 1688—the last private clan battle in Scotland—where the MacDonalds of Keppoch were victorious. Coll then joined the Jacobite rising, taking part in the siege of Inverness and the Battle of Killiecrankie. During the Jacobite rising of 1689 the MacDonalds of Keppoch laid siege to the town of Inverness. Shortly afterwards, the MacDonalds of Keppoch fought at the Battle of Killiecrankie, in which the Jacobites won victoriously, but remain ineffective in establishing a Sturart restoration.

=== 18th century ===
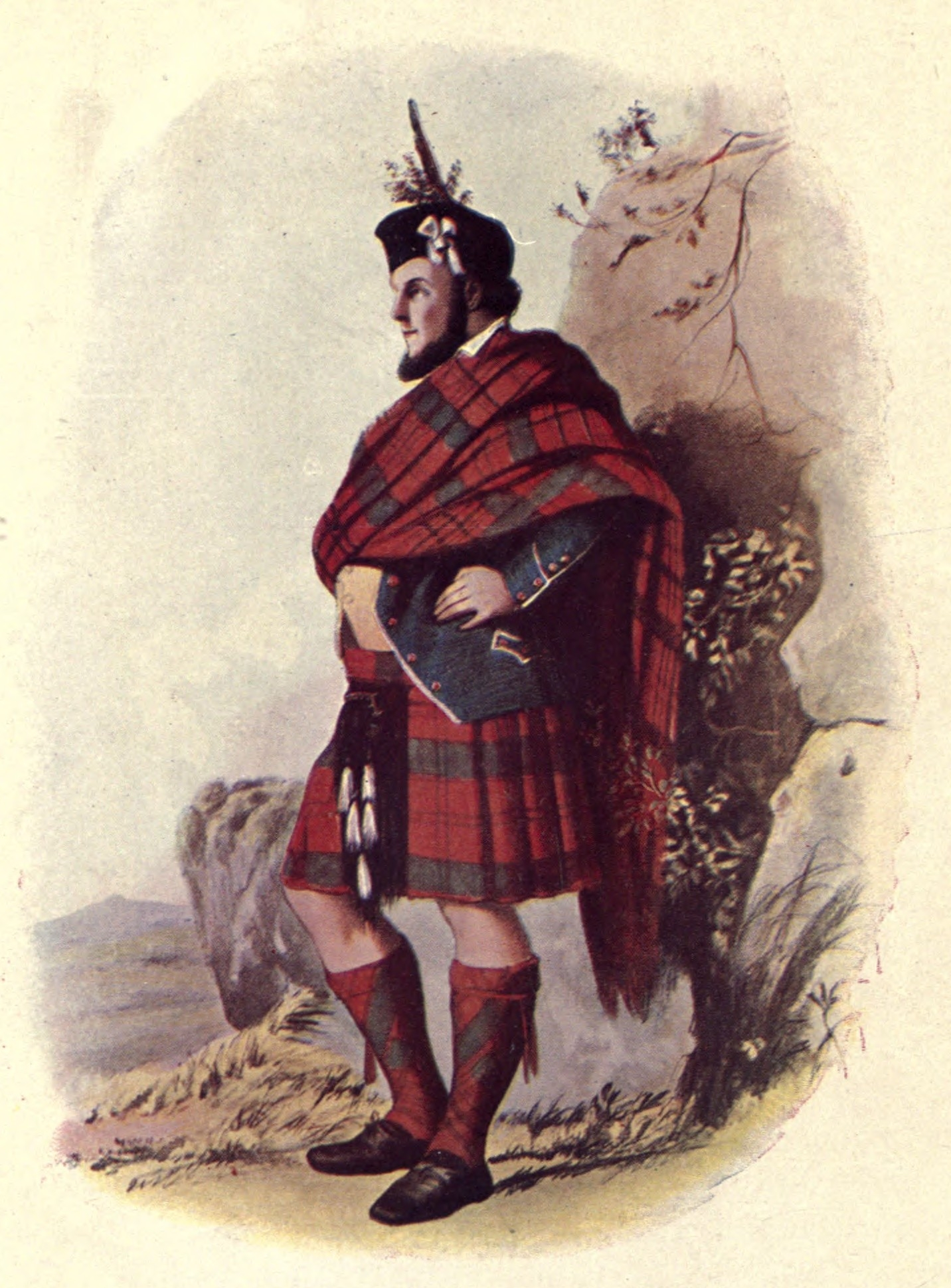
From The Highland clans of Scotland; their history and traditions (1923) by R.R. McIan. This illustration is titled "MacDonald of Keppoch".

During the Jacobite rising of 1715, Clan MacDonald of Keppoch were indirectly involved in the siege of Inverness (1715). General Wade's report on the Highlands in 1724, estimated the clan strength at 220 men. Coll MacDonald and his clansmen would eventually fight for the Jacobites at the Battle of Sheriffmuir. After the Jacobite Rising of 1715 failed, Coll MacDonald suffered exile in France for a time, but retained his power after the Rising, eventually dying in 1729.

During the Jacobite rising of 1745, the Chief, Alexander Macdonald, 17th of Keppoch, was among the men who attacked British Government soldiers who were preparing a surprise assault on the Glenfinnan gahering at what is now known as the Highbridge Skirmish. This was the first strike on the government during the 1745 rising. The MacDonalds of Keppoch were also involved in the siege of Fort William in March 1746. On the morning of 16 April 1746, Clan MacDonald of Keppoch were present at the Battle of Culloden. During the battle, the MacDonald regiments were located on the extreme left wing of the Jacobite army, instead of their preferred place on the right wing. According to legend, these regiments refused to charge when ordered to do so, due to the perceived insult of being placed on the left wing. According to tradition, Alexander of Keppoch, upon seeing that his men were reluctant to advance as ordered, he reproached them by shouting Mo Dhia, an do thrèig clann mo chinnidh mi? ("My God, have the children of my clan forsaken me?") before charging alone with pistol and sword drawn. More contemporary accounts, however, suggest that Keppoch led the attack surrounded by a small group of close kinsmen with the rest of his men following in support. During the advance Keppoch had his right arm shattered by a musket-ball: he was subsequently hit in the chest and died some time later while being carried off the field by his illegitimate son Aonghas Bàn. While his regiment appear to have partly rallied in an attempt to defend against government cavalry, they suffered heavy casualties and dispersed after the Jacobite defeat.

Among the Keppoch Jacobites to suffer the supreme penalty after the defeat of the Uprising was Major Donald MacDonald, the Tacksman of Tir na Dis near Spean Bridge, who was executed at Carlisle in October 1746. Before his death, however, the Major stated, "I die a member of the Holy Roman Catholic Church in the Communion of which I have lived... And I here declare, upon the faith of a dying man, that it was with no view to establishing that church or religion in this nation that I joined the Prince, but purely out of duty and allegiance to our only rightful, lawful, and native sovereign, due to him had he been a heathen, Mahomedan, or even a Quaker."

Alexander was succeeded by his son, Ranald, the 18th Chief, followed by his son, Richard, 19th Chief. The chiefship would become dormant in 1848 with the death of Chichester, the 21st Chief.

=== 19th century to present ===
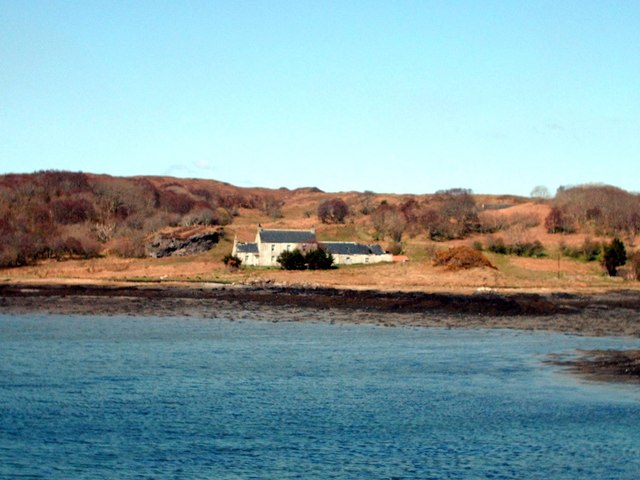
Keppoch House which replaced Keppoch Castle

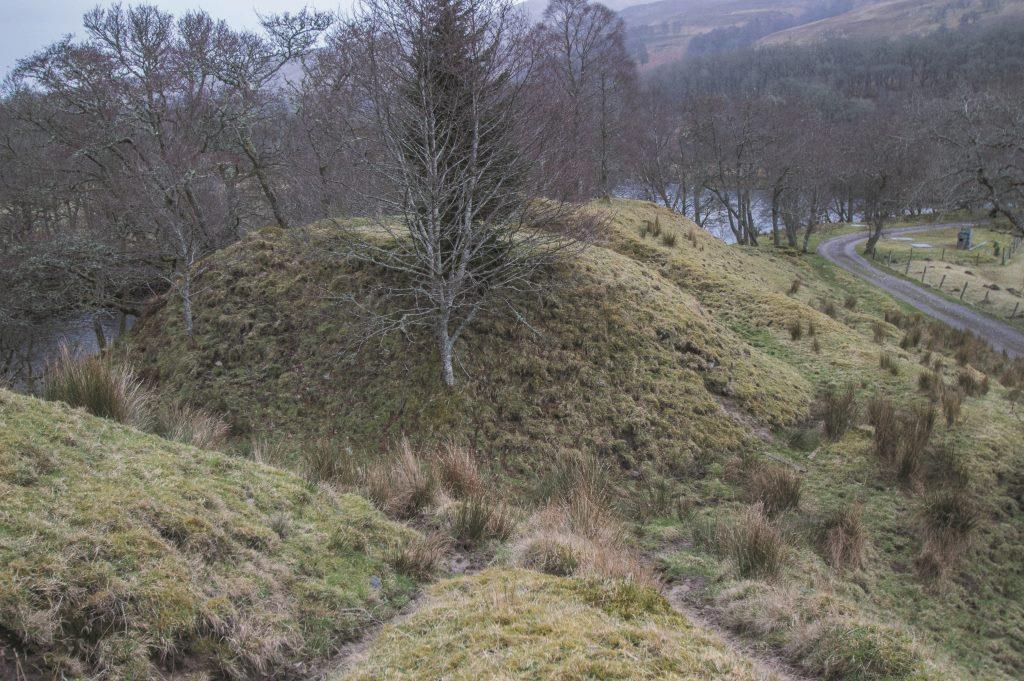
The remains of Castle Keppoch, the original seat of the chiefs of Clan MacDonald of Keppoch.

John de Lotbinière MacDonald (c. 1857 – 1935), paternal grandson of John MacDonald of Garth was the 21st clan chief. Maternally, his grandfather was Robert Unwin Harwood, and Michel-Eustache-Gaspard-Alain Chartier de Lotbinière was his great-grandfather. Shortly afterwards, there was little to no record of the clan, as the succession ended when the original line of Coll MacDonald, 16th of Keppoch ended upon the death of the 21st chief, John de Lotbinière. Thus, the clan was without a chief for the next couple of generations.

The next chief wasn't acknowledged until 13 September 2006 when Ranald Alasdair MacDonald of Keppoch was acknowledged as the lawful chief by the Lyon Court, following a 30-year fight for the right to use the ancient title of Mac Mhic Raonuill. His descent from Donald Gorm, younger brother of Archibald 15th Chief (c. 1680) was accepted by the Court. Ranald Alasdair died on the 11th of October, 2023 in Edinburgh, Scotland. The current chief is Kenneth Donald MacDonald, 23rd Chief of the Honorable Clan Ranald of Lochaber.

== Clan Castle ==
The seat of the chief of the Clan MacDonald of Keppoch was originally at Castle Keppoch which was near to Spean Bridge in Lochaber. In 1690 it passed to the MacKintoshes. The lands were then disputed with the MacKintoshes, with the last clan battle being fought here. The castle itself had been demolished in 1663 after the Keppoch murders. By 1690, the surrounding lands passed to Clan Mackintosh. These lands remained a source of contention between the two clans, culminating in the Battle of Mulroy in 1688.

Following the loss of Castle Keppoch, an early homestead known as Keppoch House was built nearby, likely during the latter half of the 17th century. This structure was burned by government troops after the Battle of Culloden in 1746 during the suppression of the Jacobite clans. The present Keppoch House, constructed around 1760 by the 18th Chief of Keppoch, was built on the same site and remains associated with the lineage of the MacDonells of Keppoch.

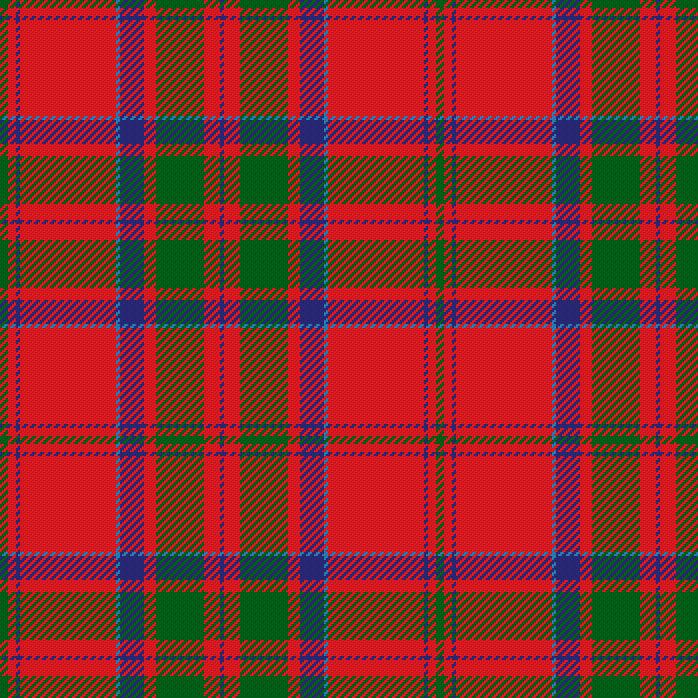
Registered tartan for Clan MacDonald of Keppoch, according to W & A K Johnston's 1906 publication. In their initial registry, Charles Edward Stuart is said to have been given a plaid of this tartan, which he left at Moy Hall in his hasty escape to the Isle of Skye.

== Clan profile ==
- Clan chief: Traditionally the chiefs of Clan MacDonald of Keppoch have been styled as "Mac Mhic Raonuill". The current chief of the clan is Kenneth Donald MacDonald, 23rd Chief of the Honorable Clan Ranald of Lochaber. The current chief's sloinneadh or pedigree is Kenneth Donald 'ic Ragnhaill Alasdair 'ic Aonghus 'ic Chichester 'ic Alasdair 'ic Richard 'ic Alasdair 'ic Ragnhaill 'ic Aonghus 'ic Raonall 'ic Donald "Glass" 'ic Raonall Ghlais 'ic Donald "Glass" 'ic Alastair Boloine 'ic Raonall Og 'ic 'ic Alastair nan Gleann 'ic Iain Aluinn 'ic Donald 'ic Aonghas na Fearste 'ic Alistair Carrach 'ic Eoin 'ic Aonghais Og 'ic Aonghais Mhor 'ic Domhnaill 'ic Ragnhaill 'ic Somhairle.
- Chiefly arms: The current chief's coat of arms is blazoned: Quarterly, 1st, argent, a lion rampant gules, armed and langued Or; 2nd; Argent, a hand in armour fessways holding a cross-crosslet fitchee Gules; 3rd, Argent, a lymphad sails furled and oars in action sable, Flagged gules; 4th, Azure, a salmon naiant in fess proper. According to author Norman H. MacDonald, another variation of the chief's arms was blazoned as: Or, a lion rampant Gules, a canton Argent, charged with a dexter hand couped fessways proper holding a cross-crosslet, fitchy of the second.
- Clan member's crest badge: The crest badge is suitable for members of the Keppoch MacDonald clan to wear, which consists of the heraldic crest and slogan. The crest is: a golden eagle with outspread wings wearing a crown. The slogan within the crest badge is AIR MUIR'S AIR TIR, which translates from Scottish Gaelic as "By Sea By Land".
- Clan badge: The clan badge or plant badge attributed to the clan is common heather. This plant is attributed to the other Macdonald clans and some other associated clans such as Clan MacIntyre and the Macqueens of Skye.
- Pipe music: The bagpipe tune Spaidsearachd Alasdair Charraich (translation from Scottish Gaelic: "Alasdair Carrach’s March") is attributed to the clan. Other pipe tunes Ceapach na fasaich ("Keppoch in the Wilderness"), Latha na Maoile Ruadh ("The Day of Mulroy"), and An tarbh breac dearg (The Red Speckled Bull) is also ascribed to the clan. Another pipe tune that is associated with the clan is "MacDonald took the Brae on them", which was used shortly after their victory at the Battle of Mulroy.
- Gaelic name: Clann Dòmhnaill na Ceapaich, Clann Mhic Raghnaill na Ceapaich

== See also ==
- Sìleas na Ceapaich
- Ailean a' Ridse MacDhòmhnaill
- Ranald MacDonald (bishop)
- Allan MacDonald (poet)
- Macdonald, things named Macdonald on Wikipedia
