= Siege of Inverness (1650) =

Scottish Civil War conflict

Coordinates: 57.476°N 4.225°W

- Part of Wars of the Three Kingdoms (Scottish Civil War)
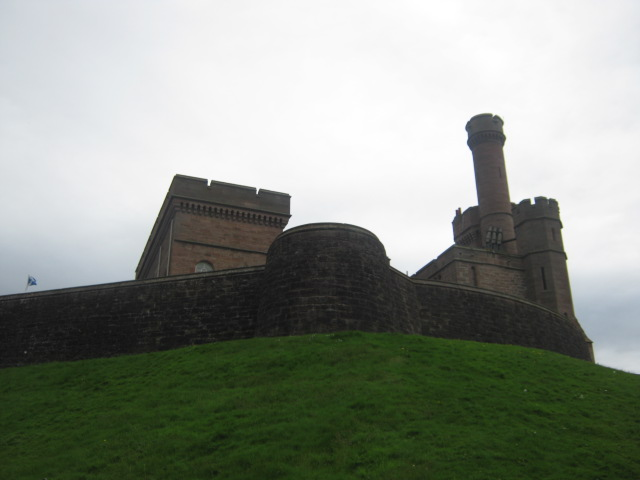
- Inverness Castle in modern times. Some of the old curtain wall can be seen in the foreground, while the castle building itself was rebuilt in 1836
Date	1650
Location	Inverness, Scotland
Result	Covenanters withstand the siege and Royalists are forced to retreat.

Belligerents
Royalists	Covenanters: Clan Fraser of Lovat

Commanders and leaders
James Graham, 1st Marquess of Montrose; Lewis Gordon, 3rd Marquess of Huntly	Sir James Fraser

Strength
Unknown	Unknown

Casualties and losses
Unknown	Unknown

The siege of Inverness of 1650 was part of the Scottish Civil War that formed part of the Wars of the Three Kingdoms. Lewis Gordon, 3rd Marquess of Huntly, who was operating under the leadership of the royalist James Graham, 1st Marquess of Montrose, unsuccessfully laid siege to Inverness Castle which was being held by Covenanters of the Clan Fraser of Lovat under Sir James Fraser of Brea.
