= Siege of Inverness (1562) =

Coordinates: 57.47631°N 4.22550°W

- Part of the Scottish clan wars
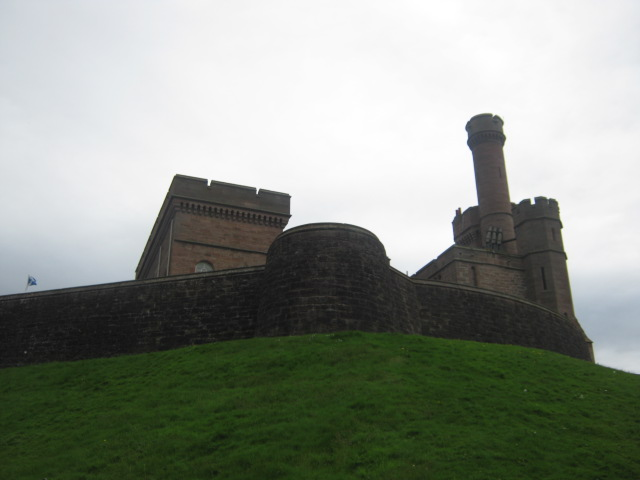
- Inverness Castle in modern times. Some of the old curtain wall can be seen in the foreground, while the castle building itself was rebuilt in 1836
| Date | 8–11 September 1562 |
| Location | Inverness, Scotland |
| Result | Fraser & Munro victory |

Belligerents
| Supporters of Mary, Queen of Scots: Clan Fraser of Lovat; Clan Munro | Supporters of George Gordon, 4th Earl of Huntly: Clan Gordon |

Commanders and leaders
| William Fraser; Robert Munro | Alexander Gordon |

Strength
| Unknown | Unknown |

Casualties and losses
| Unknown | Unknown |

The siege of Inverness Castle took place in 1562. When Mary, Queen of Scots, visited Inverness on 9 September 1562 the gates of the castle were shut in her face by Alexander Gordon upon the orders of George Gordon, 4th Earl of Huntly, who was chief of Clan Gordon and Sheriff of the county. The castle was subsequently besieged by supporters of the Queen.

The siege lasted for three days and, when the castle fell, Alexander Gordon was hanged for treason. His head was displayed on the castle. Some key members of the garrison, which consisted of only 12 or 14 "able persons", were imprisoned, the others allowed to go free. The Queen slept at Inverness Castle on the nights of 11, 12, 13, and 14 September 1562, then moved on to Spynie Palace. She bought gunpowder and 15 tartan plaids for her lackeys and members of her household in Inverness.

Alexander Mackenzie's later account of the siege includes the clans Mackenzie, Ross, Fraser, and Munro contributing to Queen Mary's rescue but only the Frasers and Munros are mentioned in the earliest account written by George Buchanan. Buchanan's account was originally written in Latin but was published in English by James Aikman in 1827, it reads:

Upon hearing of the danger of their princess, a great number of the ancient Scots, partly by persuasion, and partly of their own accord, flocked around her, particularly the Frasers and Monros, the bravest of these tribes. When the queen found herself sufficiently strong, she laid siege to the castle, which having neither a sufficient garrison, not being properly fortified for sustaining an attack, surrendered, when the commanders were executed, and the men dismissed.

The English diplomat Thomas Randolph recorded a remark made by Queen Mary at Inverness, who was in high spirits and undismayed in the conflict. When the night watch returned in the morning she regretted that she was "not a man to know what life it was to lie all night in the fields, or to walk upon the causeway with a jack and knapschall, a Glasgow buckler and a broad sword."

== See also ==
- Marian civil war
