= Siege of Inverness (1746) =

Jacobite victory in Scotland

Siege of Fort George (1746)
- Part of the Jacobite rising of 1745
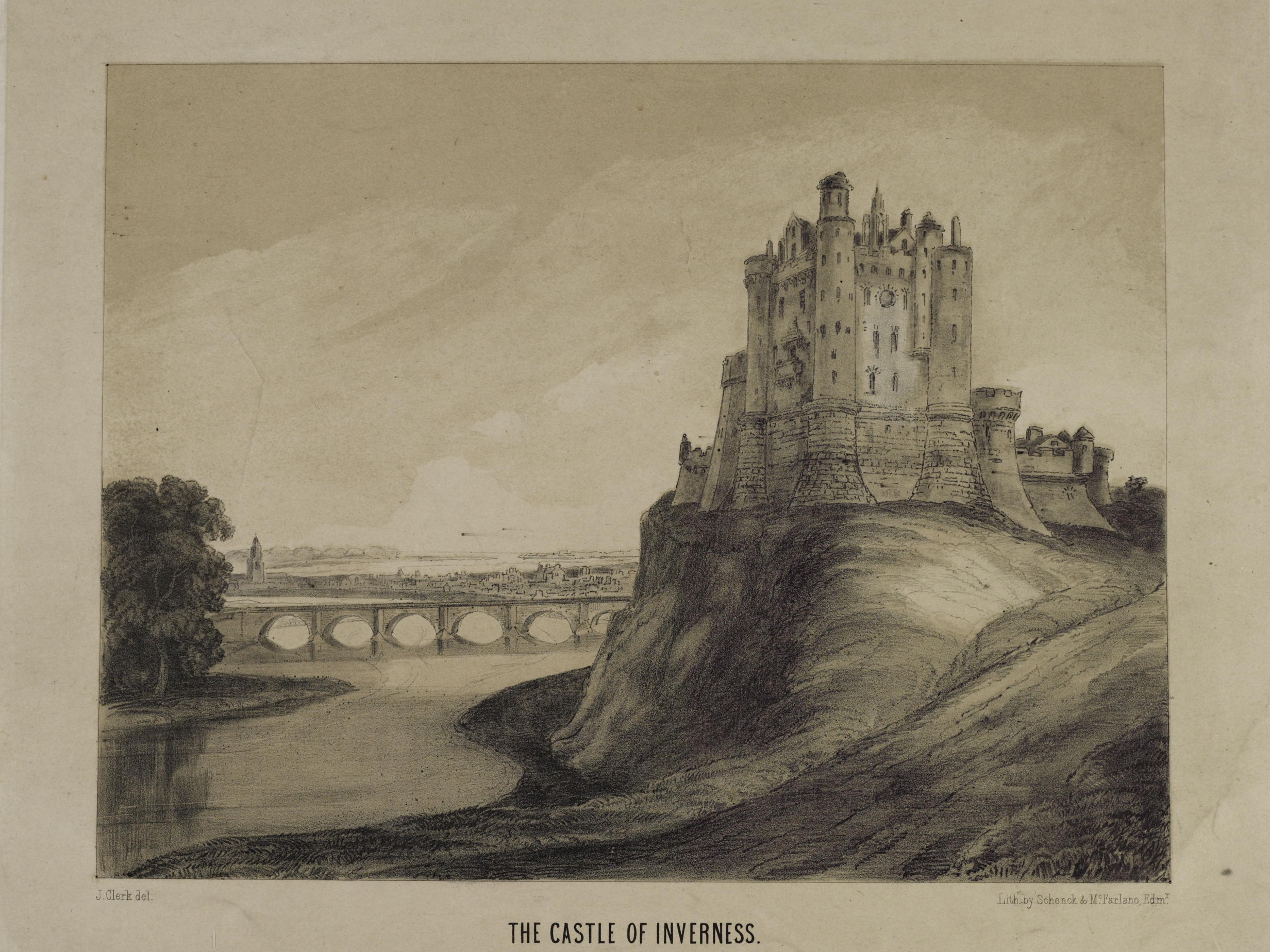
- The Castle of Inverness, J. Clack
Date	21 February 1746
Location	Inverness, Scotland, Great Britain 57°28′34″N 4°13′31″W
Result	Jacobite/French victory

Belligerents
British Jacobites France	(Kingdom of Great Britain) British Government

Commanders and leaders
James Drummond; John O'Sullivan	George Grant

Strength
3,000	266

Casualties and losses
Light	266 killed, wounded and captured
- Location within Inverness area

The siege of Inverness (also known as the siege of Fort George) (Note: The original Fort George in the Scottish Highlands was built on the site of Inverness Castle after the Jacobite rising of 1715 and is not to be confused with the later Fort George built north-east of Inverness after the Jacobite rising of 1745.) took place in February 1746 and was part of the Jacobite rising of 1745. Supporters of Prince Charles Edward Stuart laid siege to Old Fort George, a medieval castle that had been garrisoned by Crown forces. After three days of fighting, the fort was surrendered after the attackers threatened to blow up the old castle by tunnelling under its walls.

== Background ==
By early February 1746, John Campbell, 4th Earl of Loudoun, supporter of the British government, had nearly 2,000 men under his command, mostly from the Independent Highland Companies. He waited at Inverness for the Jacobites under Prince Charles Edward Stuart, however he was ordered by Duncan Forbes, Lord Culloden, to quit Inverness in view of the superior size of the Jacobite force. The Independent Companies were then transported over the Cromarty Firth, then over the Dornoch Firth and into Sutherland without loss. Loudon's retreat had left him and his force 28 miles (45 km) away from the Old Fort George in Inverness, which was now stranded beyond any possible hope of relief in the midst of the Jacobite force of 3,000 men.

== Siege ==
The Old Fort George had somewhat cramped lines of defence, with the tower of the original tower house still standing inside the newer bastioned rampart. The governor of the fort, Major George Grant, had at his disposal two Independent Highland Companies, those of the Laird of Grant and the Master of Ross, as well as eighty or so regular troops of Guise's 6th Regiment who were reckoned "some of Loudon's best men".

James Drummond, 3rd Duke of Perth, assumed overall command on the Jacobite side, to the annoyance of Sir John O'Sullivan who believed that he and the Marquis d'Eguilles were managing perfectly on their own. O'Sullivan carried out his reconnaissance on the morning of 19 February and saw that the fort's double layered defenses were too formidable for the Jacobites to escalade and also proof against the single cannon that was available to them. However, O'Sullivan noticed that the foundations were unstable and made the bastion facing the bridge vulnerable to mining. That evening O'Sullivan and Colonel James Grant set their men to work in opening the mine. They built an emplacement on the Bara Hill overnight, and on the morning of 20 February they opened fire with their cannon.

The defenders of the fort were powerless to stop the progress of the mining; their hand grenades had little effect and they could not depress the barrels of their cannon sufficiently to bring them to bear on their enemies. Major George Grant, with good reason, feared that the rampart would be blown up beneath him, and therefore surrendered the fort on 21 February 1746.

== Aftermath ==
When news of the surrender reached the Lord Justice Clerk in Edinburgh, he complained that Grant could have held the Jacobites at bay for a few more days, and the Duke of Cumberland exclaimed that he was "no way able to explain how, or by what it is so, but a silly affair it is". The Jacobites plundered the ample provisions from inside the fort and Prince Charles Edward Stuart ordered the curtain walls to be razed and the bastions blown up in order for the fort to be of no use if it fell back into the hands of the government. This however cost the life of one of his French sergeants who was inspecting a demolition charge that had hung fire. The two Government Independent Highland Companies that had been captured were later reformed after the Battle of Culloden and carried out useful service for the government.
