= Sìleas na Ceapaich =

Scottish poet

Sileas NicDhomhnaill
- Born: 1660
- Died: 1729 (aged 68–69)
- Occupation: Poet
- Spouse: Alexander Gòrdan
- Parent(s): Mary Macmartin of the Macmartin Camerons, Archibald (Gilleasbuig) Macdonald
- Relatives: Coll Macdonald, 16th of Keppoch (brother)

Sìleas na Ceapaich (also known as Cicely Macdonald of Keppoch, Silis of Keppoch, Sìleas MacDonnell or Sìleas Nic Dhòmhnail na Ceapaich) was a Scottish poet whose surviving verses remain a significant contribution to Scottish Gaelic literature. She lived between around 1660 and 1729. Her given name Sìleas is Anglicised variously as Cicely or Julia.

== Life ==
Sìleas was born into the Scottish nobility (Scottish Gaelic: flath) of the Gàidhealtachd of Scotland. She was the daughter of the 15th Chief of Clan MacDonald of Keppoch, Archibald (Gilleasbuig) Macdonald, and Mary Macmartin of the Macmartin branch of Clan Cameron. Her brother Coll was 16th Chief. Although the Clan had lost some of its status, they were still considered to be part of the upper levels of Gaelic society. She grew up in Lochaber.

In 1685, she married Alexander Gordon of Camdell, estate factor to the Duke of Gordon, and lived the rest of her adult life at Beldorney Castle, Banffshire. She is known to have had at least eight children, five sons and three daughters.

Scholar Colm Ó Baoill recalls what we know about her from the local oral tradition:

"[...] in her youth she was rather frivolous, frolicsome as it is written in English: and it is not known that there is no truth; there are people who believe that her eldest son was an illegitimate son. The mouth will not tell[,] tell us what effect Siléas's marriage (in 1685) had on this beadra [probably from Gàidhlig "beadarach" meaning "full of fun, playful"), but it is said that she had a 'meeting' with death. Later she changed her habits, became religious and began to compose hymns. It is not known what the truth is in this story, or if there is any truth at all"

== Work ==
She is most notable for the 23 poems she wrote in the Scottish Gaelic language. Many of her poems are political, having a strongly Jacobite theme. Others include anti-war laments for friends killed in the Jacobite risings of the period, humorous advice to unmarried women, and a handful of devotional Christian poetry. Among the Jacobite poems attributed to her is Tha mi am chadal, "I am sleeping", closely related to the Irish air Táimse im' chodladh. Her best known poem is her c. 1723 eulogy for Alasdair Dubh, 11th Chief of Clan MacDonald of Glengarry, which praises the deceased for following the code of conduct traditionally demanded of a Scottish clan chief and hearkens back to the Old Irish poetry attributed to the mythological bard Amergin Glúingel. Like her other work, the eulogy seems to have been aimed at a Jacobite audience mainly within the various branches of Clan Donald.

She was the main war poet in the first Jacobite rising of 1715 but is also known for her Christian poetry like the "Hymn On The Death Of Her Husband And Daughter".

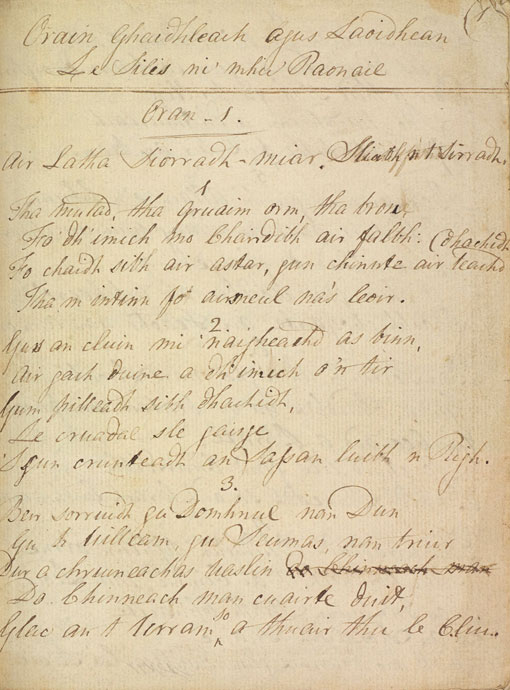
To The Army of the Earl of Mar or Song on the Battle of Sherriffmuir

Her surviving poems are in a mixture of classical Gaelic syllabic metres (Dán Díreach) and the newer stressed metres (Scottish Gaelic: Òran), and were clearly intended to be sung, with some being based on popular folk song tunes of the time.
