= Siege of Inverness (1429) =

Coordinates: 57.476°N 4.225°W

The siege of Inverness of 1429 was a conflict between Alexander of Islay, Earl of Ross (also 3rd Lord of the Isles and chief of Clan Donald) and the Scottish crown. Alexander of Islay besieged the royal Inverness Castle and burnt the town of Inverness to ashes.

== Background ==
When James I of Scotland returned to his kingdom from captivity in England he set about subduing those who threatened his royal authority including his own kinsmen, the Albany Stewarts, but also Alexander of Islay, Earl of Ross (Alexander MacDonald, Lord of the Isles) as well as some of the most powerful men in the northern territories such as Angus Mackay of Strathnaver - a leader of 4000 fighting men, Kenneth Mor, John Ross, William Leslie and Angus de Moray who were each leaders of 2000 men. They had all been imprisoned after arriving in good faith to meet James at Inverness Castle in 1428.

== The siege ==
James executed some of his prisoners but Alexander of Islay, Earl of Ross was set free after a few months. Alexander showed his gratitude by gathering his fighting men and razing most of Inverness to the ground in 1429.

== Aftermath ==
On 27 August 1429 Alexander of Islay surrendered himself to the king at Holyrood Abbey. Stripped to his underclothes and made to hand over his sword in front of the king, Alexander was led away into captivity in Tantallon Castle.
