= Letters of fire and sword =

Obsolete Scottish legal warrant

Letters of fire and sword were a Scottish legal instrument. If a criminal resisted the law and refused to answer his citation, it was considered treason in the Scottish courts; and “letters of fire and sword” were sent to the sheriff, authorising him to use either or both these instruments to apprehend the contumacious party.

== Well known letters issued ==
Letters of Fire and Sword were issued against the following clans:

- Clan Gregor under James the VI
- Clan Chattan under James the V
- Clan Cameron
