= Siege of Inverness (1689) =

The siege of Inverness that took place in 1689 was carried out by the Clan MacDonald of Keppoch, a Highland Scottish clan against the people of the city of Inverness. In 1665 the people of Inverness had rioted seriously injuring a number of men of the Clan MacDonald. Twenty four years later in 1689 the feud was re-ignited and the Clan MacDonald of Keppoch laid siege to the city with 800 to 900 men. They plundered the town and took hostages. Through the mediation of John Graham, 1st Viscount Dundee a ransom was paid for the release of the captives and the MacDonalds of Keppoch went home with their plunder, robbing and devastating all before them. The MacDonalds of Keppoch soon after supported John Graham, 1st Viscount Dundee at the Battle of Killiecrankie.
