= Victoria Borwick =

British politician

The Right Honourable The Lady Borwick
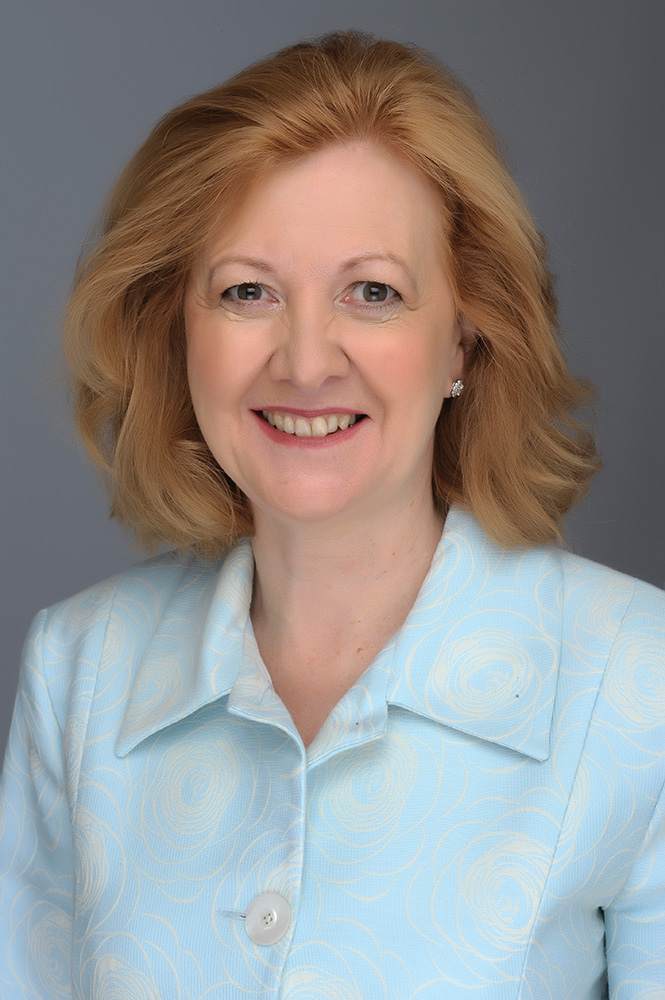
- Borwick in 2017

Member of Parliament for Kensington
- In office 7 May 2015 – 3 May 2017
- Preceded by: Malcolm Rifkind
- Succeeded by: Emma Dent Coad

5th Deputy Mayor of London
- In office 9 May 2012 – 13 May 2015
- Mayor: Boris Johnson
- Preceded by: Richard Barnes
- Succeeded by: Roger Evans

Member of the London Assembly as an additional member
- In office 1 May 2008 – 16 September 2015
- Preceded by: Graham Tope
- Succeeded by: Kemi Badenoch

Personal details
- Born: Victoria Lorne Peta Poore; 26 April 1956 (age 70) London, England
- Party: Conservative
- Spouse(s): Jamie Borwick (m. 1981) 5th Baron Borwick
- Children: 4
- Website: Mayoral website Parliament biography

Victoria Lorne Peta Borwick, Baroness Borwick (née Poore, 26 April 1956), is a British politician who served as the Member of Parliament for Kensington from 2015 to 2017 under the Conservative Party, becoming the first MP for Kensington to lose the seat to the Opposition.

Prior to entering politics, Borwick pursued a career in event management, working in senior management for P&O and DMG World Media. After joining Conservative Party HQ as fundraising director, she became a councillor in Kensington and Chelsea and a Member of the London Assembly (MLA) from 2008 to 2015, serving as Deputy Mayor of London from 2012 to 2015.

== Personal and business life ==
Born in London, the only child of Wing Cdr Dennis Poore (1916–1987), a kinsman of the Poore baronets, she was educated at Wispers School. She married Jamie Borwick on 20 March 1981, who succeeded his uncle in 2007 as the 5th Baron Borwick and entered the House of Lords in 2013 as one of the 92 elected hereditary peers. They have three sons and a daughter: 2nd son the Hon. Thomas Borwick is a digital media strategist for the Conservative Party.

Borwick was in the event management industry for most of her working life, including being group director of events of shipping company P&O. She organised the Olympia Fine Art and Antiques Fairs as director from 1990 to 2001, and in 2002 was recruited to assist International Fine Art Expositions' New International Fine Art Fair in New York City.

As President of the British Antique Dealers' Association, she became the subject of media speculation during the run-up to the 2017 general election for using her friendship with Theresa May to influence the Conservative Party into dropping a 2015 manifesto pledge for the total ban of selling ivory in the United Kingdom.

Admitted to the Freedom of the City of London, Lady Borwick is a member of the livery of the Clockmakers' Company.

== Earlier political career ==
In September 1999, Borwick was chosen as Conservative mayoral candidate Steve Norris' running mate and potential deputy mayor for the 2000 London Mayoral election. She was also given a place on the Conservative Party list for the London Assembly, although unsuccessful in getting elected.

Borwick was elected to Kensington and Chelsea London Borough Council in May 2002 as Councillor for the Abingdon Ward. She became Director of Income Generation and Marketing for the Conservative Party in October 2002, with the aim of increasing revenue from the party's supporter base.

In the run-up to the 2004 London Mayoral election, Borwick declared her intention to seek the Conservative mayoral candidacy. She made the shortlist but was not one of the final two in the selection, which included Steve Norris who received the nomination. She spoke subsequently at the 2003 Conservative Party Conference in support of Norris. In her speech she said of the incumbent Mayor Ken Livingstone that "you are the weakest link, goodbye", alluding to her supposed resemblance with the television presenter Anne Robinson.

Borwick assisted the think tank Open Europe from 2009 to 2015 as a member of its advisory board.

=== 2008 London mayoral contest ===
Borwick announced her candidacy for the nomination for the 2008 mayoral election in July 2006. During her initial campaign, she declared "London needs a redhead, not Red Ken" in allusion to her hair colour. The Conservative Party, however, would later announce that the candidates "did not satisfy the party's hope of attracting a national name" and postponed the planned open primaries. In 2007, she published a Centre for Policy Studies pamphlet entitled "The Cost of Ken" which itemised the Greater London Authority budget.

In the middle of the postponed mayoral selection, Borwick unsuccessfully ran for the selection as Conservative London Assembly candidate for West Central against Kit Malthouse. The Mayoral selection resumed in summer 2007, and Borwick was one of the final four candidates shortlisted. She finished second in the ballot, receiving 1,869 votes compared to the winner Boris Johnson's 15,661 ballots. She later acted as a consultant in Johnson's successful campaign.

=== Assembly Member and London Deputy Mayor ===
Borwick was elected to the London Assembly as one of three London-wide members for the Conservatives after the 2008 election. She had been placed second on the Conservative list for the election after unsuccessfully seeking to become a prospective parliamentary candidate.

Having been returned as a Member (AM) in the 2012 election, Boris Johnson, Mayor of London, appointed her Deputy Mayor of London in succession to Richard Barnes.

In an interview with the London Evening Standard in 2013, Borwick was described as "the person who would step up should Boris ever fall under a [proverbial] London bus" as Johnson's "First Deputy". On 16 September 2015, she resigned from the Assembly, Conservative Kemi Badenoch succeeding to her seat.

== Parliamentary career ==
=== 2015–17 Parliament ===
On 13 March 2015, Borwick was selected as the Conservative PPC for the Kensington constituency at the 2015 general election. The seat was previously held by Conservative MP Sir Malcolm Rifkind during the 2010–2015 Parliament.

On 7 May 2015, Borwick was elected as Member for Kensington with 18,199 votes (a majority of 7,361 over Labour). The Conservative vote increased by 2.2% compared with the previous election, though there was a 1.7% swing to Labour. She resigned as Deputy Mayor on 13 May 2015, being replaced by fellow Assembly Member, Roger Evans, and stood down from the Assembly on 16 September 2015, with Kemi Badenoch appointed to her seat.

The Sunday Telegraph revealed in June 2015 that Borwick was "topping up her Parliamentary salary with tens of thousands of pounds in public money from two additional elected roles", in contrast to the practice of other MPs who, despite also acting as London councillors, had given up their allowances to avoid taking multiple salaries on the public purse.

=== Views on the UK's EU membership ===
Borwick assisted the eurosceptic think tank Open Europe from 2009, being a Member of the advisory board until 2015.

Borwick publicly supported Brexit in the 2016 referendum and, with her son, Thomas Borwick, campaigned for Vote Leave. This is in spite of the fact that the Royal Borough of Kensington and Chelsea (in which the Kensington constituency is located) had a greater proportion of EU nationals than any other London borough in 2016. 69% of the borough, in contrast to Borwick, voted in favour of Britain's continued membership of the European Union.

The London Evening Standard reported that the discrepancy between Borwick's views on this matter and those of her constituents put her at risk of losing the Kensington seat in the 2017 general election.

Borwick was one of over 70 signatories to an open letter from Conservative Members of Parliament to the BBC in March 2017, criticising the broadcaster's coverage of Brexit and accusing it of being "unable to break out of pre-referendum pessimism" by ignoring "economic good news" since the referendum.

=== 2017 general election ===
The British press reported in the run-up to the election that Borwick, being acquainted with the incumbent Prime Minister Theresa May, was influential in the decision to remove from the Conservative manifesto the party's previous pledge of a total ban on ivory trading. Borwick, who also serves as President of the British Antique Dealers' Association, told the House of Commons in 2016 "any ban on antique ivory is cultural vandalism". She restated her mission to keep the ivory trade alive in 2019.

On 31 May 2017, Borwick participated alongside rival parliamentary candidates at a local hustings in Notting Hill, at which, according to the London Evening Standard, she was repeatedly heckled and booed by constituents. Borwick did not attend the subsequent constituency hustings on 5 June 2017 in Earl's Court, an absence that was mocked by the Evening Standard. On 7 June 2017, Borwick's campaign team was accused in the media of having deleted comments from residents of Kensington on her social media platforms.

Borwick lost by 20 votes to Labour, which won the Kensington seat for the first time. The Conservatives' loss of this once-safe seat surprised many and was widely reported in the British and international media as a consequence of Borwick's support of a hard Brexit.

In the final result, Borwick lost the seat to the Labour candidate Emma Dent Coad on a 10.6% swing. The winner was declared nearly 24 hours after polls closed because three recounts were necessary. In her speech conceding defeat, she stated her intention to "start the fight back for Kensington and the Conservatives". However, her bid to be re-stand for the seat was derailed in the summer of 2019 when executive members of the local Conservative party ruled her out of the contest.

== Arms ==
Coat of arms of Victoria Borwick

Notes
Lady Borwick's arms depict those of her husband marshalled with her paternal Poore arms on an escutcheon of pretence (as an heraldic heiress).
Adopted
1987
Crest
Not applicable for ladies
Escutcheon
On a lozenge (for Borwick), viz, Argent three Escarbuncles fesswise Sable between as many Bears' Heads erased of the Last muzzled Or and, in the centre an inescutcheon (for Poore), viz, Argent a Fess Azure between three Mullets Gules.
Previous versions
Arms of the Poore baronets

== See also ==
- Baron Borwick
- Poore baronets

Parliament of the United Kingdom
Preceded by Malcolm Rifkind	Member of Parliament for Kensington; 2015–2017	Succeeded by Emma Dent Coad
