= Simon Fraser, Master of Lovat =

Scottish nobleman (1939–1994)

Simon Augustine Fraser, Master of Lovat (28 August 1939 – 26 March 1994) was the son of 15th Lord Lovat and the former Rosamond Broughton. He predeceased his father, and his son Simon inherited the Lordship of Lovat in 1995. He died of a heart attack while hunting on his (then) estate at Beaufort Castle.

== Life ==
During his life, the Master of Lovat accumulated an estimated £7m in debts. As a result, upon his father's death in 1995, the family estate of Beaufort Castle was sold, for around £2m. His son, the 16th Lord Lovat, has voiced his determination to buy it back.

Fraser spent around three years as a lieutenant in the Scots Guards, mostly overseas. He had business interests in salmon aquaculture and smoking salmon in New Hampshire and Maine, USA and Scotland. He was an investor in vineyards in Australia. He had a small stake in oil in North Africa.

== Family ==
On 21 February 1972, Fraser married Virginia Grose, a daughter of David Grose and Diana Varè, a daughter of Daniele Varè, and together they had four children:

- The Hon. Violet Fraser, born 1972
- The Hon. Honor Fraser, born 1973
- Simon Fraser, 16th Lord Lovat, born 1977
- The Hon. John Fraser, born 1984
