= Robert Borwick, 1st Baron Borwick =

Justice of the Peace for the County of London

Robert Hudson Borwick, 1st Baron Borwick (21 January 1845 – 27 January 1936), known as Sir Robert Borwick from 1902 to 1916, and as Sir Robert Borwick, 1st Baronet from 1916 to 1922, was a British businessman and a Justice of the Peace for the County of London.

== Biography ==
Borwick was the son of George Borwick of Torquay, and his wife Jane (née Hudson), and was Chairman of the family firm George Borwick & Sons Ltd, manufacturer of baking and custard powders, which had been founded by his father.

Robert Borwick was made a Knight Bachelor in the 1902 Birthday Honours and knighted by King Edward VII at Buckingham Palace on 18 December 1902. He was created a Baronet (in the Baronetage of the United Kingdom), of Eden Lacy in the County of Lancaster, in 1916.

In 1922 he was further honoured when he was raised to the peerage as Baron Borwick, of Hawkshead in the County of Lancaster, for "providing hospital treatment for the sick and wounded Colonial officers throughout the war".

He was also a Knight of Grace of the Order of St. John of Jerusalem.

Lord Borwick married in 1872, Caroline (d. April 1936), daughter of the Reverend Richard Daniel Johnston of Kurnool, India. They had two sons and seven daughters. Latterly the family resided almost continually in Nice and Paris.

He died in January 1936, aged 91, and was succeeded in his titles by his eldest son George, 2nd Baron Borwick. He is buried in the Cimetière du Château in Nice.

Coat of arms of Robert Borwick, 1st Baron Borwick
Crest Upon a mount Proper in front of a staff raguly erect Azure a stag browsing Or attired Sable. Escutcheon Argent three escarbuncles fesswise Sable between as many bears’ heads erased of the last muzzled Or. Supporters On either side a bear Sable muzzled and charged on the shoulder with an escarbuncle Or. Motto Fugit

== Sources ==
- Whittaker's Peerage, Baronetage, Knightage, and Companionage, London, 1935, p. 154.
- Kidd, Charles, & Williamson, David, (editors), Debrett's Peerage and Baronetage, St. Martin's Press, New York City, 1990.

Baronetage of the United Kingdom
New creation	Baronet (of Eden Lacy); 1916–1936	Succeeded by George Borwick
Peerage of the United Kingdom
New creation	Baron Borwick; 1922–1936	Succeeded by George Borwick
