= Simon Fraser, 16th Lord Lovat =

British stockbroker, financial analyst and nobleman

The Right Honourable The Lord Lovat
- Coat of arms of Lord Lovat
- Predecessor: Simon Fraser, 15th Lord Lovat
- Born: Simon Fraser; 13 February 1977 (age 49)
- Residence: London
- Spouse: Petra Palumbo (m. 2016)
- Heir: Hon. John Fraser, Master of Lovat
- Parents: Simon Fraser, Master of Lovat; Virginia Grose

Simon Christopher Joseph Fraser, 16th Lord Lovat, 5th Baron Lovat (born 13 February 1977), has been the chief of Clan Fraser of Lovat since the death of his grandfather in 1995.

== Early life ==
Lord Lovat is the son of Simon Fraser, Master of Lovat, and his wife, Virginia (née Grose). He is the grandson of the 15th Lord Lovat. He has two older sisters, Violet (b. 1972) and Honor (b. 1973), and one younger brother, John (b. 1984). Honor Fraser is a former fashion model.

Lovat attended Harrow School, and graduated from the University of Edinburgh.

While still at Harrow, he assumed the title of Lord Lovat on the death of his grandfather in 1995. His father Simon Lovat (then Master of Lovat and heir to the title) had died the previous year whilst riding on a hunt at the family's Beaufort estate. Due to considerable debts, the family was forced to sell Beaufort Castle.

Lovat lost his seat in the House of Lords in 1999, when the law was changed to take away the automatic seats of most hereditary peers.

== Later life ==
Lovat became a stockbroker, and worked for a time in Geneva before moving to London. He currently works as a commodities analyst.

He married Petra Palumbo in May 2016, at St Stephen Walbrook, London. She is the daughter of Peter Palumbo, Baron Palumbo. They have two daughters.

== Ancestry ==
Ancestors of Simon Fraser, 16th Lord Lovat

16. Simon Fraser, 13th Lord Lovat
8. Simon Joseph Fraser, 14th Lord Lovat
17. Alice Mary Weld-Blundell
4. Simon Christopher Joseph Fraser, 15th Lord Lovat
18. Jonathan Thomas Jester II, 4th Baron Ribblesdale
9. Hon. Laura Lister
19. Charlotte Monkton Tennant
2. Simon Augustine Fraser, Master of Lovat
20. Sir Delves Louis Broughton, 10th Baronet
10. Sir Henry John Delves Broughton, 11th Baronet
21. Rosamond Broughton
5. Rosamond Delves Broughton
22. Boscawen Trevor Griffith-Boscawen
11. Vera Edyth Griffith-Boscawen
23. Agnes Lillian Bellers
1. Simon Fraser, 16th Lord Lovat
24. Grose
12. Grose
6. David Grose
3. Virginia Grose
28. Giovanni Battista Varè
14. Daniele Varè
29. Elizabeth Frances Chalmers
7. Diana Varè
15. Elizabeth Maryons Stansfeld

Honorary titles
Preceded by Simon Fraser	MacShimidh; 1995–present	Incumbent
Baronage of Scotland
Preceded by Simon Fraser	Baron of Castlehill; 1995–present	Incumbent
Peerage of Scotland
Preceded by Simon Fraser	Lord Lovat; 1995–present	Incumbent
Peerage of the United Kingdom
Preceded by Simon Fraser	Baron Lovat; 1995–present Member of the House of Lords (1995–1999)	Incumbent; Heir: Jack Fraser, Master of Lovat
