= Bill Millin =

Bagpiper during World War II

William Millin
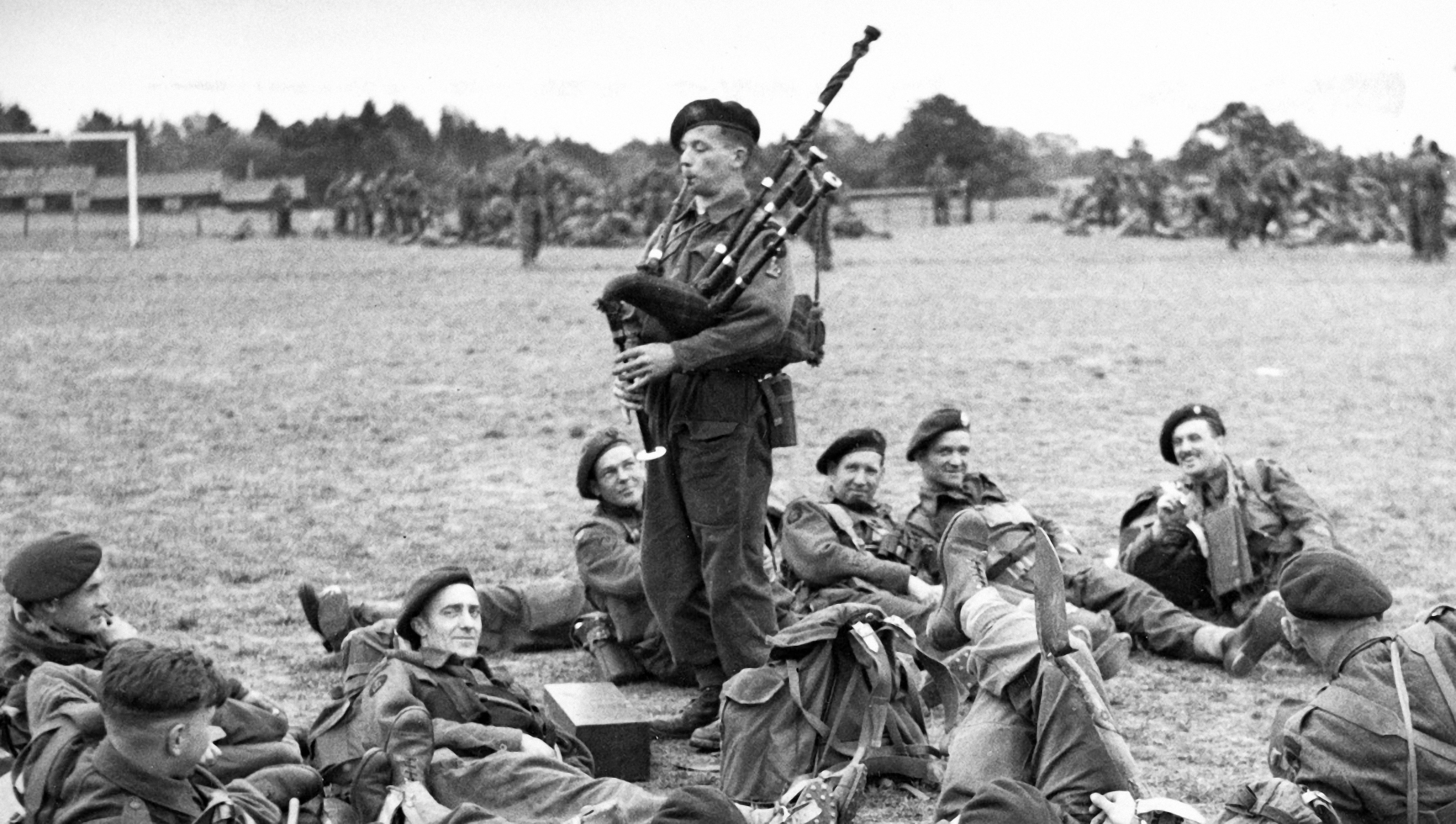
- Bill Millin plays his pipes for fellow soldiers in 1944
- Born: 14 July 1922; Regina, Saskatchewan, Canada
- Died: 18 August 2010 (aged 88); Torbay, England
- Military career
- Allegiance: United Kingdom
- Branch: British Army
- Rank: Private
- Nickname: Piper Bill
- Units: Highland Light Infantry; Queen's Own Cameron Highlanders; No. 4 Commando
- Conflicts: Second World War; Normandy landings
- Awards: Legion of Honour (France)
- Other work: Psychiatric nurse

William Millin (14 July 1922 – 18 August 2010), commonly known as Piper Bill, was a Canadian-born British soldier, and the personal piper to Simon Fraser, 15th Lord Lovat, commander of the British 1st Special Service Brigade at D-Day.

== Early life ==
Millin was born in Regina, Saskatchewan, on 14 July 1922 to Scottish parents. His father moved the family to the Prairies, but returned to Glasgow as a policeman when William was three. He grew up and went to school in the Shettleston area of the city. He joined the Territorial Army in Fort William, where his family had moved, and played in the pipe bands of the Highland Light Infantry and the Queen's Own Cameron Highlanders before volunteering as a commando and training with Lovat at Achnacarry along with French, Dutch, Belgian, Polish, Norwegian, and Czechoslovak troops.

== Second World War ==
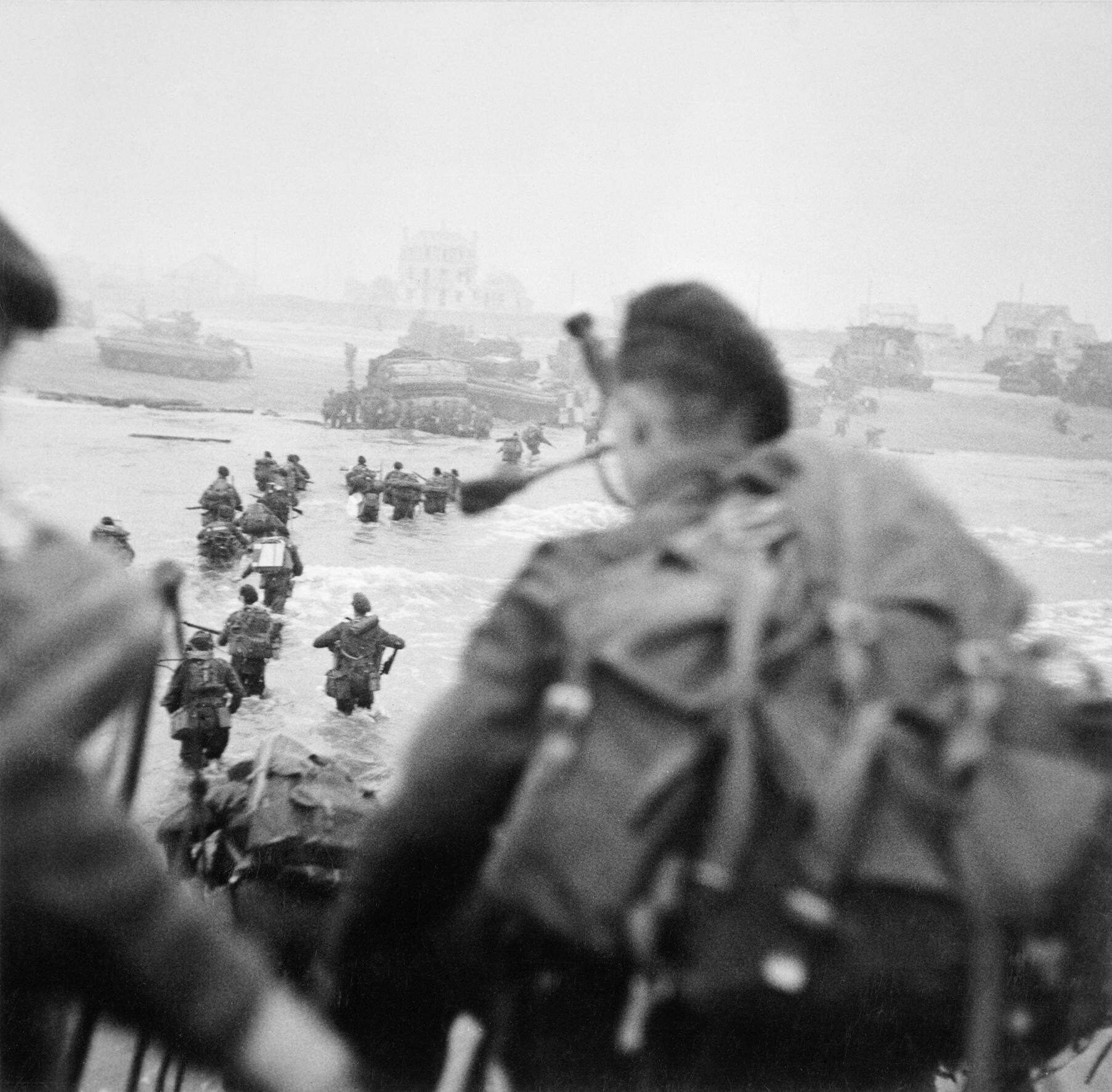
Landing on Queen Red Beach, Sword; Millin is in the foreground at the right; Lovat is wading through the water to the right of the column.

Millin is best remembered for playing the bagpipes whilst under fire during the D-Day landing in Normandy. The use of bagpipes was restricted to rear areas by the time of the Second World War by the British Army. Simon Fraser, 15th Lord Lovat, nevertheless, ignored these orders and ordered Millin, then aged 21, to play. When Private Millin demurred, citing the regulations, he recalled later, Lord Lovat replied: "Ah, but that's the English War Office. You and I are both Scottish, and that doesn't apply".

Millin played "Highland Laddie", "The Road to the Isles", and "All The Blue Bonnets Are Over the Border" as his comrades fell around him on Sword Beach. Millin stated that he later talked to captured German snipers who claimed they did not shoot at him because they thought he had gone mad.

Millin, whom Lovat had appointed his personal piper during commando training at Achnacarry, near Fort William in Scotland, was the only man during the landing who wore a kilt – it was the same Cameron tartan kilt his father had worn in Flanders during the First World War – and he was armed only with his pipes and the sgian-dubh, or "black knife", sheathed inside his kilt-hose on the right side.

Lovat and Millin advanced from Sword to Pegasus Bridge, which had been defiantly defended by men of the 2nd Battalion the Oxfordshire and Buckinghamshire Light Infantry (6th Airborne Division), which had landed in the early hours by glider. Lovat's commandos arrived at Pegasus Bridge a little past 1:00 PM, although the plan specified noon as the rendezvous time. To the sound of Millin's bagpipes, the commandos marched across Pegasus Bridge. During the march, twelve men died, most shot through their berets. Later detachments of the commandos rushed across in small groups with helmets on. Millin's D-Day bagpipes were later donated to Dawlish Museum. A set of pipes he used later in the campaign, after the originals became damaged, were donated to the now "Pegasus Bridge Museum".

== Later life ==
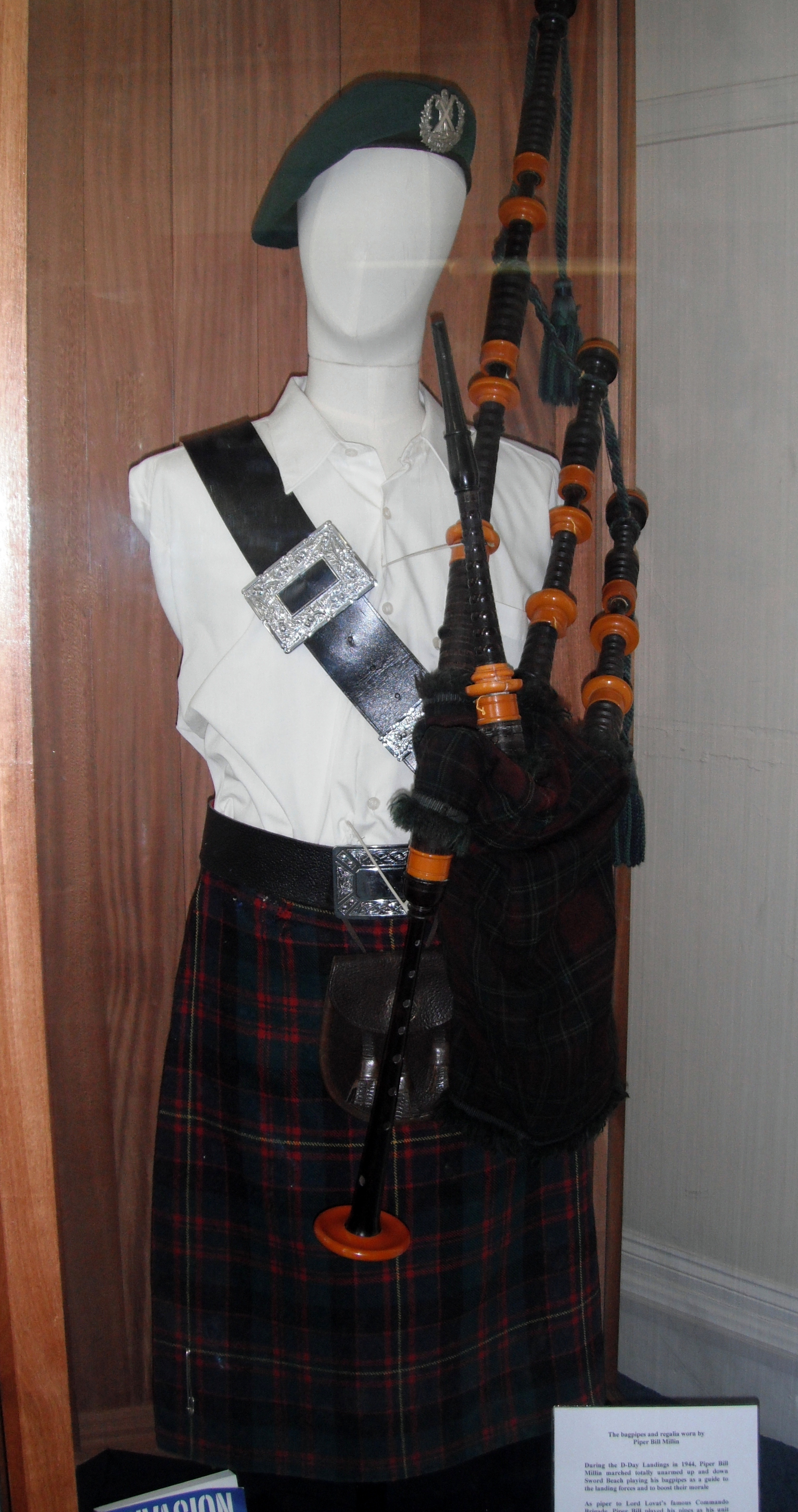
Piper Bill Millin's bagpipes played on Sword during the D-Day landings on display at Dawlish Museum along with his bonnet, 100-year-old kilt and dirk

Millin saw further action with 1st Special Service Brigade in the Netherlands and Germany before being demobilised in 1946 and going to work on Lord Lovat's highland estate. In the 1950s he became a registered psychiatric nurse in Glasgow, moving south to a hospital in Devon in the late 1960s until he retired in the Devon town of Dawlish in 1988. He made regular trips back to Normandy for commemoration ceremonies. France awarded him a Legion of Honour for gallantry in June 2009. In 2006, a Devon folk singer, Sheelagh Allen, wrote a song about him, "The Highland Piper".

Millin played the pipes at Lord Lovat's funeral in 1995. Millin, who suffered a stroke in 2003, died in hospital in Torbay on 17 August 2010, aged 88. His wife Margaret (née Dowdel, from Edinburgh) died in 2000. They were survived by their son John.

== Popular culture and legacy ==
Millin's action on D-Day was portrayed in the 1962 film The Longest Day. Millin was played by Pipe Major Leslie de Laspee, the official piper to the Queen Mother in 1961.

One set of Millin's bagpipes are exhibited at the Memorial Museum of Pegasus Bridge in Ranville, France. Another set of his bagpipes are now displayed at Dawlish Museum. Millin presented his pipes to Dawlish Museum prior to the 60th anniversary of the D-Day Landings in 2004, along with his kilt, bonnet and dirk. These items are still shown at the museum library with photographic archives and looped video telling of Millin's exploits.

Dawlish Museum officials have written testimony from Millin that the set on display in Dawlish is the genuine set which he played during the D-Day landings at Sword. The ones on show at the Pegasus Bridge Museum are a second set that were used by him later in the campaign, after the capture of Pegasus Bridge. Pegasus Museum says that it lays no claim to its set being the originals. Andrew Wright, vice chairman of Dawlish Museum, said:

The genuine pipes are here in Dawlish and not at Pegasus Bridge Museum in France, as everyone always seems to believe. I have tried to correct this many times but the myth continues and is always quoted in the media. The confusion arose many years ago when Millin's pipes were damaged a few days after D-Day and he had a spare set sent in which he called his campaign pipes. Those were given to Benouville Museum in 1974 and people assumed these were the original pipes.

With the help of son John Millin and the Dawlish Royal British Legion, a bronze life-size statue of Piper Bill Millin was unveiled on 8 June 2013 at Colleville-Montgomery, near Sword, in France.

On 7 August 2013, BBC's The One Show featured a film about Bill's son John Millin and his playing of the bagpipes in memory of his father at the unveiling of the statue to Piper Bill at Colleville-Montgomery in Normandy. Broadcast live, from Weston-super-Mare, Larry Lamb explained that Bill Millin's pipes and uniform are on display at Dawlish Museum in Devon. The film also showed scenes of more than 500 pipers from 21 countries taking part in the unveiling of the £50,000 statue by French sculptor Gaetan Ader which took more than four years of fund raising by the D-Day Piper Bill Millin Association to complete.

Canadian Celtic-punk band The Real McKenzies recorded a song about Bill Millin ("My Head Is Filled with Music") on their 2012 album Westwinds. British folk band Police Dog Hogan refer to him in their song "Fraserburgh Train", from the 2012 album "From the Land of Miracles".

== See also ==
- Jack Churchill, another British Army bagpiper serving during the Second World War
