= Simon Fraser, 15th Lord Lovat =

British commando (1911–1995)

Brigadier The Right Honourable The Lord Lovat DSO MC TD JP DL
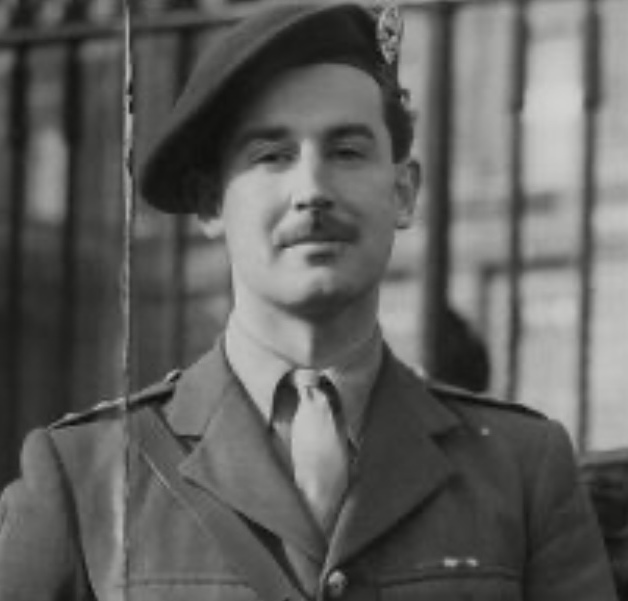
- Lord Lovat in 1942
- Born: 9 July 1911; Beauly, Inverness-shire, Scotland
- Died: 16 March 1995 (aged 83); Beauly, Inverness-shire, Scotland
- Education: Magdalen College, Oxford
- Spouse: Rosamond Broughton (m. 1938)
- Children: 6, including Simon and Tessa
- Military career
- Allegiance: United Kingdom
- Branch: British Army
- Service years: 1930–1962
- Rank: Brigadier
- Service number: 44718
- Units: Commandos; Lovat Scouts; Scots Guards
- Commands: No. 4 Commando; 1st Special Service Brigade
- Conflicts: Second World War; Operation Claymore; Operation Abercrombie; Operation Jubilee; Operation Overlord; Sword Beach; Pegasus Bridge; Battle of Ranville; Battle of Bréville (WIA)
- Awards: Companion of the Distinguished Service Order; Military Cross; Territorial Decoration; Legion of Honour (France); Croix de Guerre (France)

Brigadier Simon Christopher Joseph Fraser, 15th Lord Lovat and 4th Baron Lovat, DSO, MC, TD, JP, DL (9 July 1911 – 16 March 1995) was a prominent British Commando during the Second World War and the 24th Chief of the Clan Fraser of Lovat. Known familiarly as Shimi Lovat, an anglicised version of his name in Scottish Gaelic; his clan referred to him as MacShimidh, his Gaelic patronym. During Operation Overlord, he led the Special Service Brigade at Sword Beach and to capture Pegasus Bridge, accompanied by his piper Bill Millin.

== Early life ==
Fraser was born at his ancestral home of Beaufort Castle near Beauly, Inverness-shire, the son of Simon Fraser, 14th Lord Lovat (commonly known as the 16th Lord), and Laura, daughter of Thomas Lister, 4th Baron Ribblesdale. After being educated at Ampleforth College (where he was a member of the Officer Training Corps) and Magdalen College, Oxford, where he joined the university's Cavalry Squadron, Fraser was commissioned as a second lieutenant in the Lovat Scouts (a Territorial Army unit) in 1930. On 3 September 1932, he transferred to the Scots Guards, British Army, with seniority in the rank of second lieutenant from 27 August 1931. In both units, he served alongside his cousin Bill Stirling. The following year, Fraser succeeded his father to become the 15th Lord Lovat (referred to as the 17th Lord Lovat) and 24th Chief of the Clan Fraser. He was promoted lieutenant in August 1934. Lovat resigned his regular commission as a lieutenant in 1937, transferring to the Supplementary Reserve of Officers.

He married Rosamond Broughton, the daughter of Sir Henry John Delves Broughton, on 10 October 1938, with whom he had six children. Lord and Lady Lovat lived at Beaufort Castle.

== Second World War ==
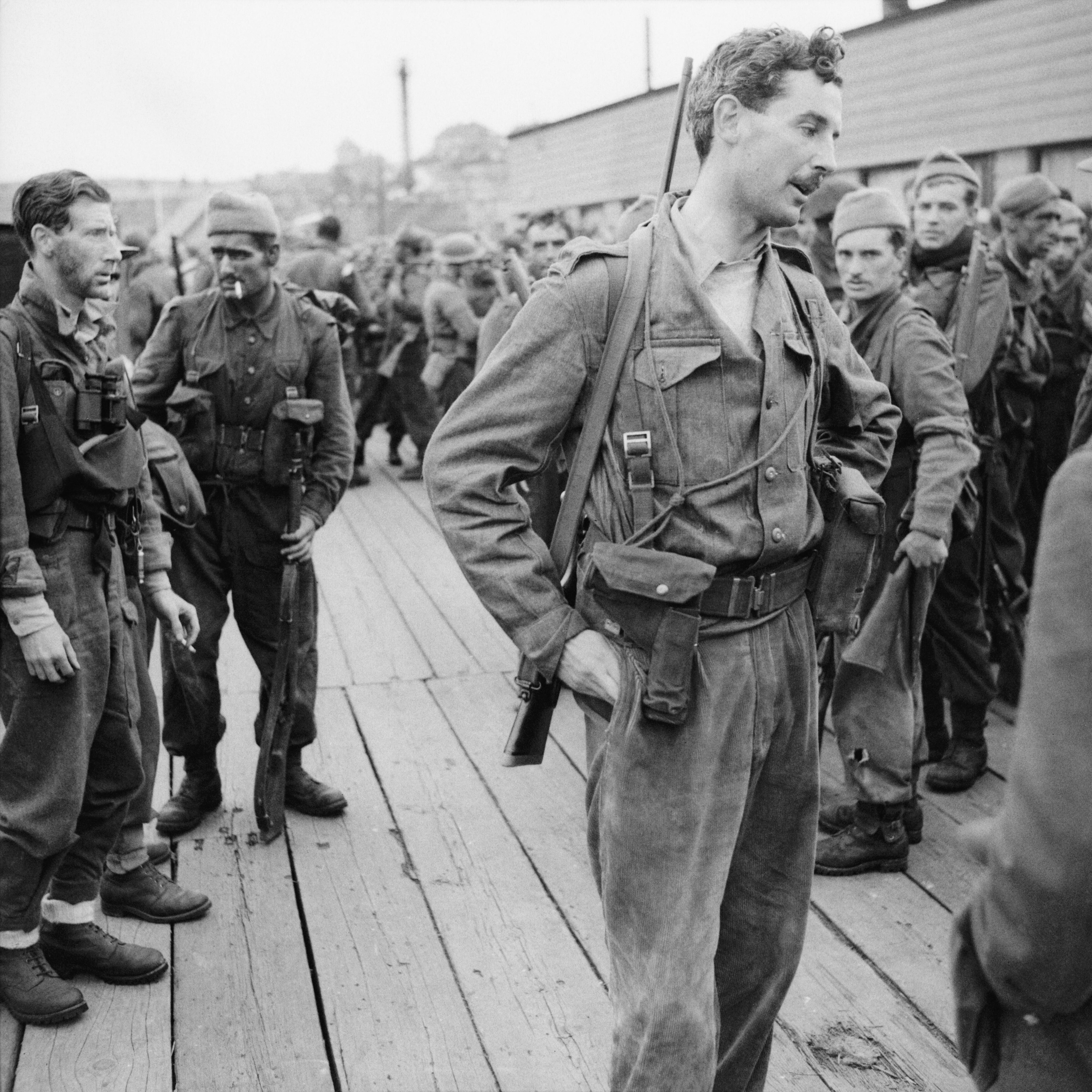
Lord Lovat at Newhaven after returning from the Dieppe Raid, August 1942.

In June 1939, just months before the Second World War, Lord Lovat also resigned his reserve commission. In July, however, as war approached, he was mobilized as a captain in the Lovat Scouts. In 1940 together with his Stirling cousins (Bill and David) and friends, including Donald Cameron of Lochiel, Lovat planned to create a new unorthodox group of shock fighters (Commandos) who would combine sea, air and land attacks using surprise as a key component. It was essential to use volunteers only. Crucial to the plan was the personal blessing of Winston Churchill, which they duly obtained. Lovat was personally involved in the training of the Commando troops on the West coast of Scotland. He was eventually attached to and led No. 4 Commando. On 3 March 1941, Nos 3 and 4 Commando launched Operation Claymore, a raid on the German-occupied Lofoten Islands. In the successful raid, the commandos destroyed fish-oil factories, petrol dumps, and 11 ships. They also seized encryption equipment and codebooks. As well, the commandos captured 216 German troops; 315 Norwegians chose to accompany the commandos back to Britain.

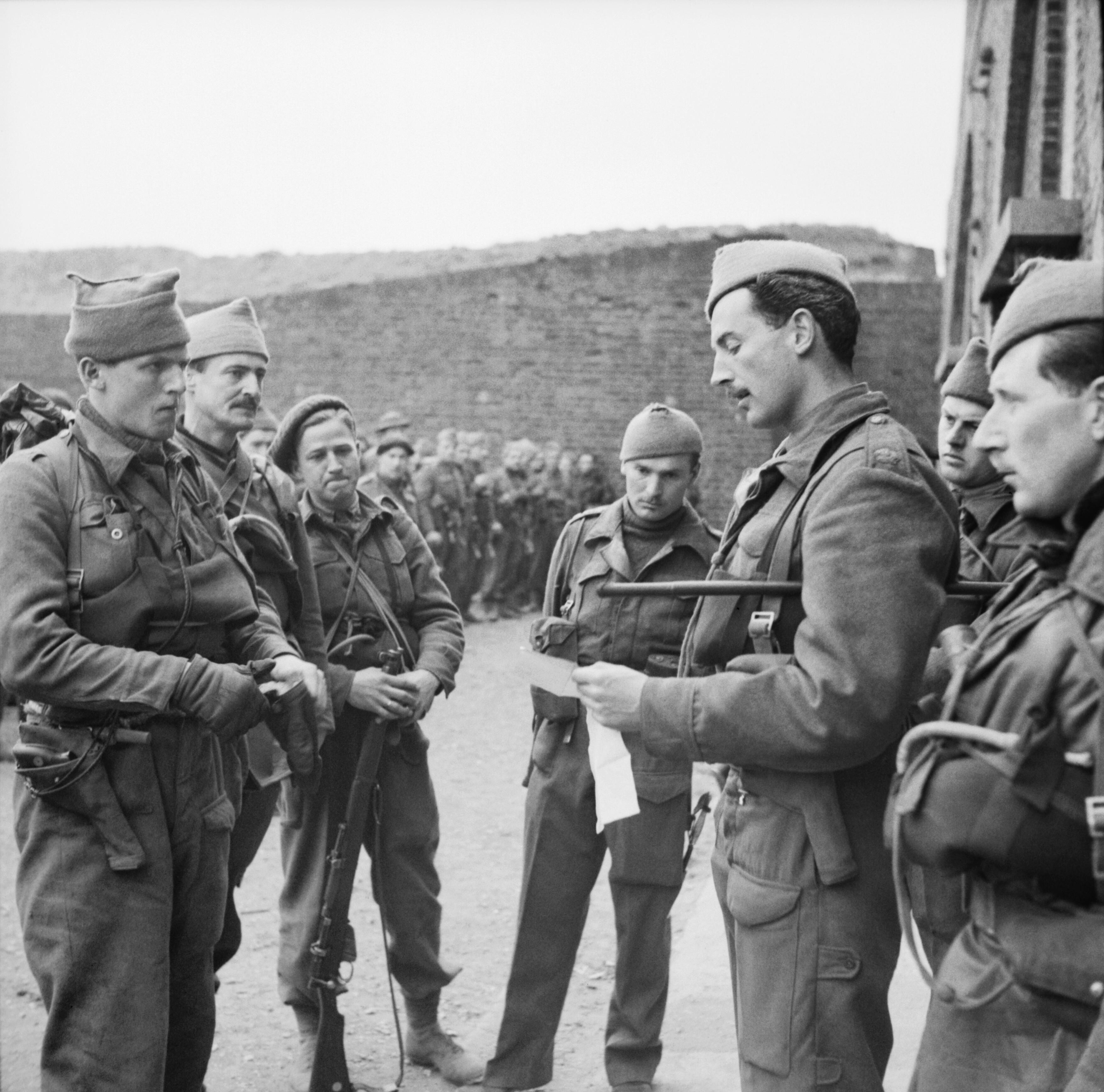
4 Commando before the Hardelot raid

As a temporary major, Lord Lovat commanded 100 men of No. 4 Commando and a 50-man detachment from the Canadian Carleton and York Regiment in a raid on the French coastal village of Hardelot in April. For this action he was awarded the Military Cross on 7 July 1942. Lord Lovat became an acting lieutenant-colonel in 1942 and was appointed the commanding officer of No. 4 Commando, leading them in a successful component of the abortive Dieppe Raid (Operation Jubilee) on 19 August. His commando attacked and destroyed a battery of six 150 mm guns. Lovat was appointed a Companion of the Distinguished Service Order (DSO).

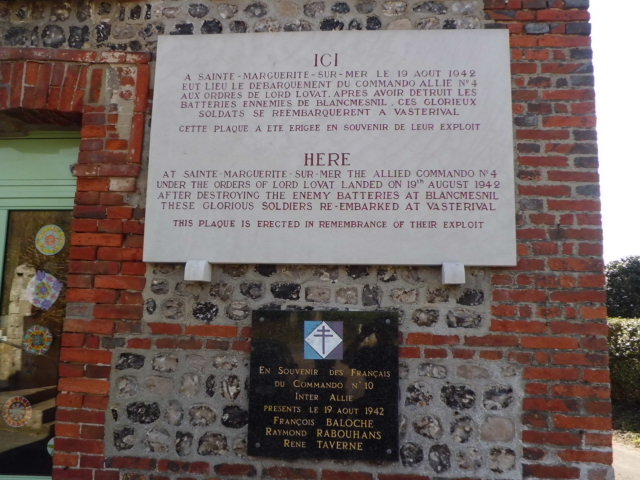
Dieppe Raid 1942, plaque at Sainte-Marguerite-sur-Mer.

The raid as a whole was a disastrous failure with over 4,000 casualties sustained, predominantly Canadian. Yet No. 4 Commando captured its objectives, the only successful part of the operation, and most of Lovat's men returned safely to Britain.

According to Hilary Saunders, the official biographer of the Commandos the men "were to arouse such a passion of hate and fear in the hearts of their enemies that first Von Runstedt and then Hitler in 1942 ordered their slaughter when captured down to the last man. Lovat had 100,000 Reich marks placed on his head, dead or alive under the infamous "Commando Order".

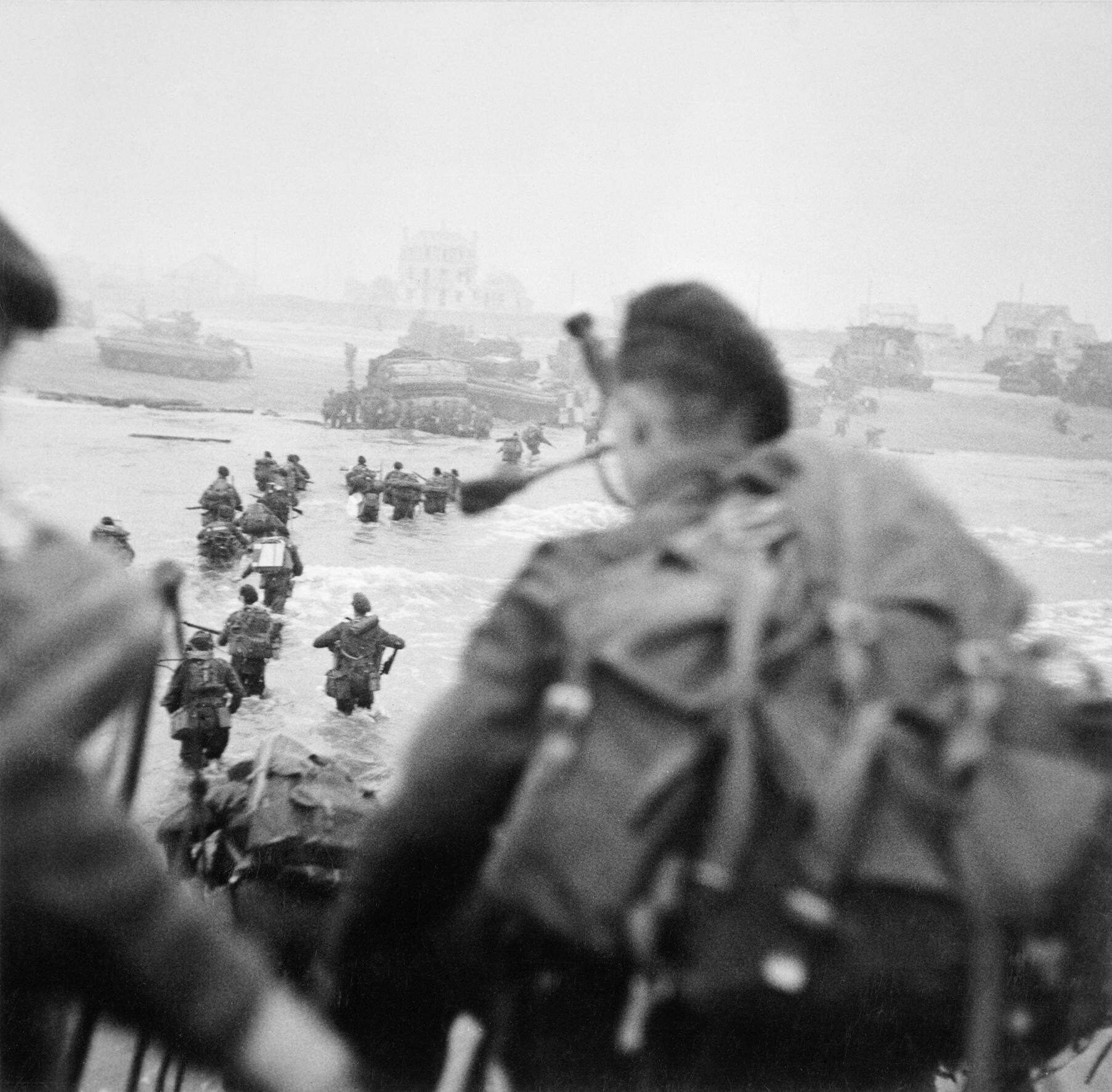
Queen Red Beach, Sword Area. Lord Lovat, on the right of the column, wades through the water. The figure in the foreground is Piper Bill Millin.

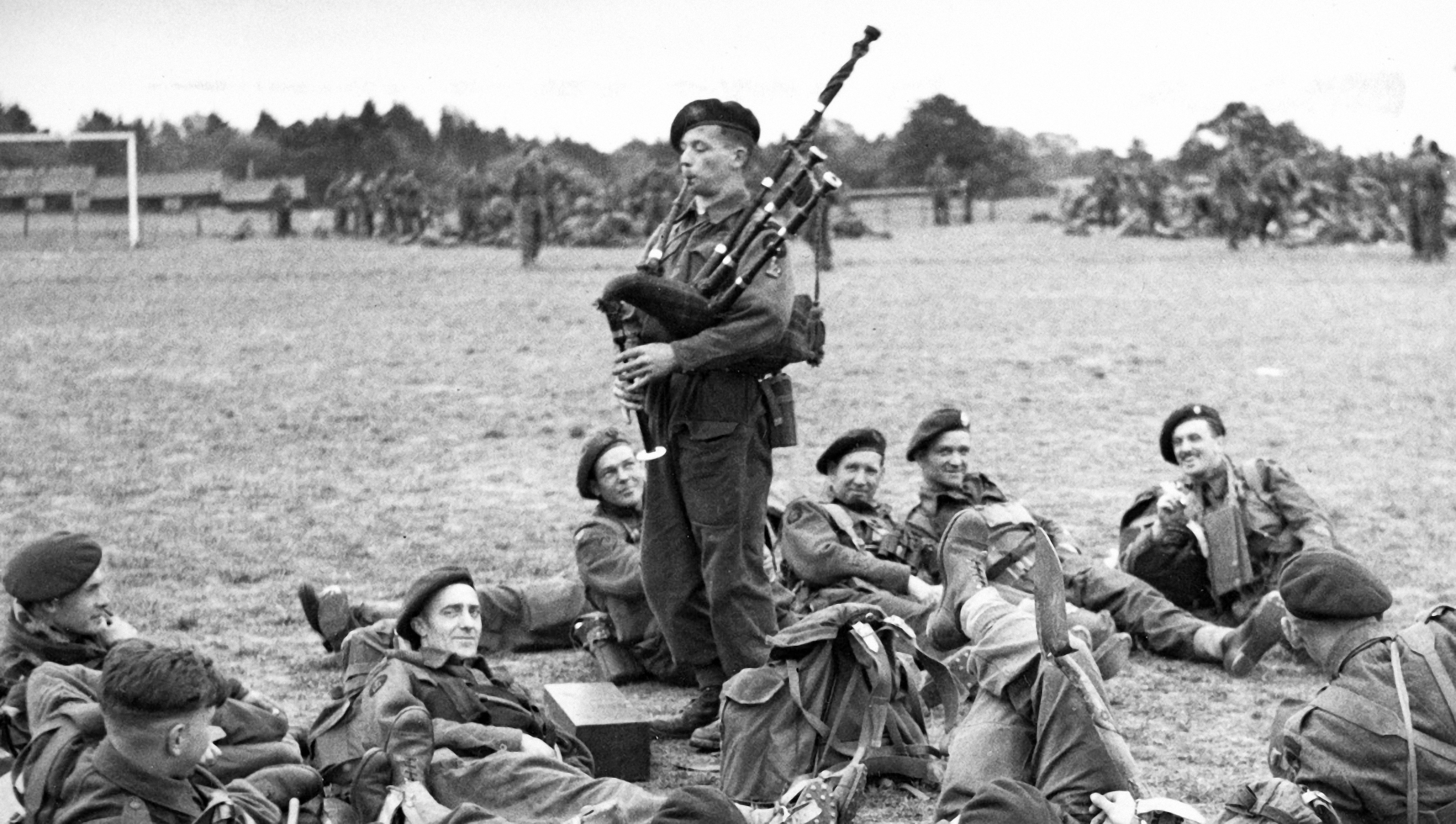
Piper Bill Millin, 1944

During the planning of Operation Overlord, in 1944, Lord Lovat was made a brigadier and appointed the Commander of the newly formed 1st Special Service Brigade. Lord Lovat's brigade was landed at Sword during the invasion of Normandy on 6 June 1944. Lovat probably waded ashore in battle dress; which is contrary to the depiction in the film The Longest Day which had him wearing a white jumper under his battledress, with "Lovat" inscribed on the collar while armed with a full stocked Mannlicher-Schoenauer stutzen rifle. This probably harks back to the Dieppe raid where Lovat was armed with a Model 1893 Steyr-Mannlicher. The latter claim is disputed; however, in some earlier pictures he is seen with a bolt-action .30-06 Winchester Model 70 sporting rifle. However in his memoirs, March Past, Lovat states that he was armed with a "short barrelled U.S. Army carbine" (presumably an M1 carbine) on D-Day.

Lord Lovat instructed his personal piper, Bill Millin, to pipe the commandos and himself ashore, in defiance of orders specifically forbidding such actions in battle. When Private Millin demurred, citing the regulations, he recalled later, Lord Lovat replied: "Ah, but that's the English War Office. You and I are both Scottish, and that doesn't apply".

Lovat's forces swiftly pressed on, Lovat himself advancing with parts of his brigade from Sword to Pegasus Bridge, which had been defiantly defended by men of the 2nd Bn the Ox & Bucks Light Infantry (6th Airborne Division) who had landed in the early hours by glider. Lord Lovat's commandos arrived at a little past 1 p.m. at Pegasus Bridge though the rendezvous time stipulated in the plan was noon. (A common misconception holds that they arrived almost exactly on time, late by only two and a half minutes.) Upon reaching the rendezvous, Lord Lovat apologised for his unit's lateness to Lieutenant-Colonel Geoffrey Pine-Coffin, of 7th Parachute Battalion. He went on to establish defensive positions around Ranville, east of the River Orne. The bridges were relieved later in the day by elements of the British 3rd Infantry Division.

For the Frasers, whose origins trace back to Normandy, it was considered a historic "full circle" moment for their clan chief to lead men back to those shores. Simon Fraser, the 15th Lord Lovat, leading his commandos in battle on D-Day in 1944 was the last time a Scottish clan chief is known to have commanded their troops in war. Although clan chiefs have continued to hold military and political positions, Lovat's actions have marked the end of an era. It was the last moment that a clan chief and his personal piper would lead forces under such circumstances. Simon Fraser, Lord Lovat, remains the most prominent examples of a clan chief in WWII whose actions deliberately recalled the ancient tradition of clan warfare. His leadership of the Commandos, particularly his use of a piper on D-Day, made his a uniquely public and symbolic demonstration of that history. Other chiefs held high command, but Lovat's actions were arguably the most theatrical and deliberate invocation of his heritage on the battlefield.

During the Battle of Breville on 12 June, Lord Lovat was seriously wounded whilst observing an artillery bombardment by the 51st Highland Division. A stray shell fell short of its target and landed amongst the officers, killing Lieutenant-Colonel A. P. Johnson, commanding officer of the 12th Parachute Battalion, and seriously wounding Brigadier Hugh Kindersley of the 6th Airlanding Brigade.

Lovat was awarded the Legion of Honour and the Croix de Guerre by the French Fourth Republic.

== Later life ==
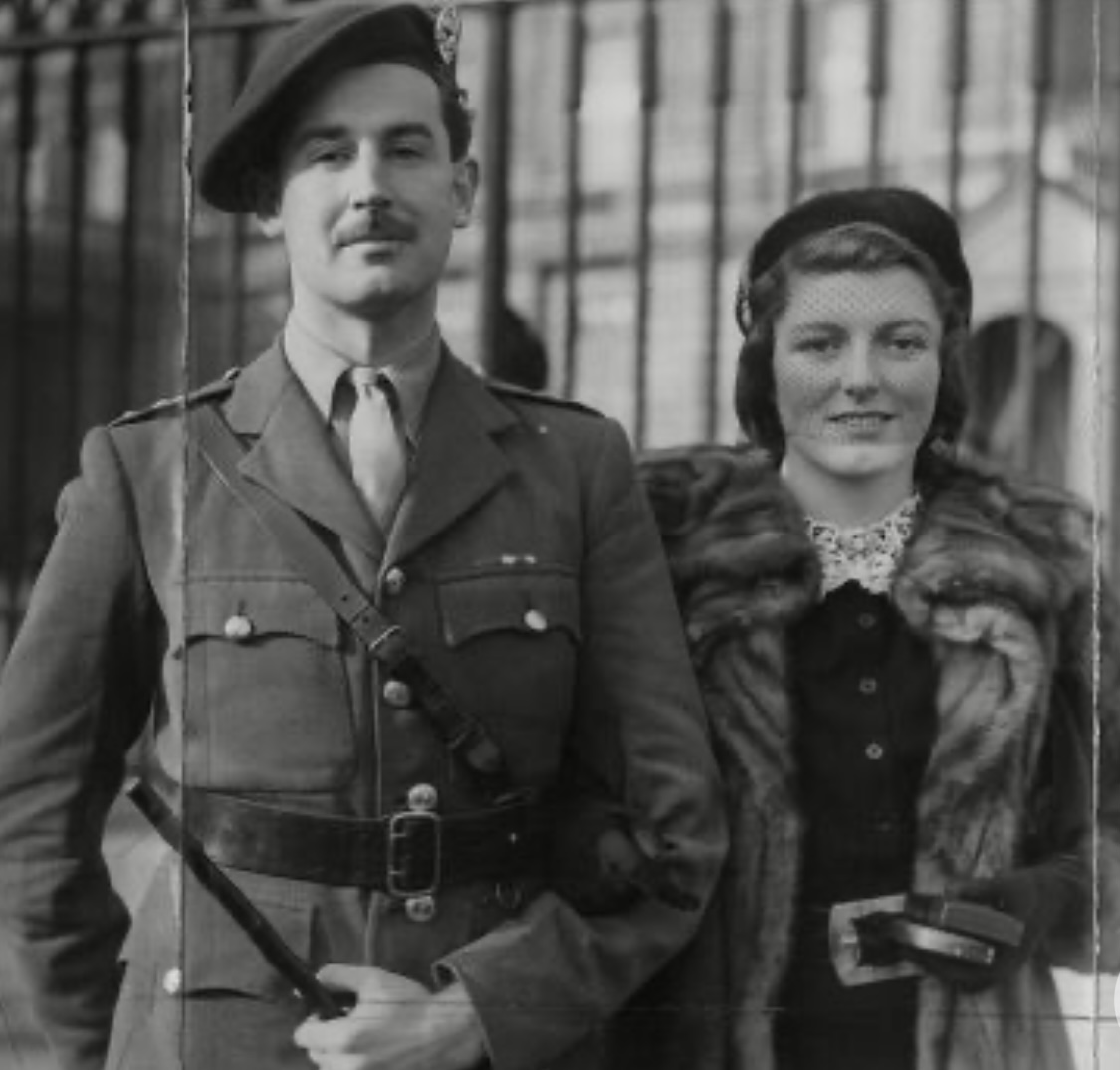
Lord and Lady Lovat at Buckingham Palace, 1942

Lord Lovat was a stalwart of the Inverness Highland aristocracy. In 1942 he was appointed a Deputy Lieutenant (post-nominal "DL") of the county, and two years later a Justice of the Peace. Lord Lovat made a full recovery from the severe wounds he had received in France but was unable to return to the army (he transferred to the reserve in 1949). In early 1945 Churchill sent him to Moscow as his envoy in a Parliamentary delegation to pay his respect to Stalin and the Presidium. Churchill notes in the final volume of his biography of the Second World War that at the crucial meeting with Stalin and President Roosevelt at Yalta in 1945 when the boundaries of Europe were being discussed Stalin kept coming back again and again, in conversation, to military questions: Stalin said he had acquired a new interest in life, says Churchill, an interest in military affairs. "He liked young military fighters like Lord Lovat". Winston Churchill requested that he become Captain of the Honourable Corps of Gentlemen-at-Arms in the House of Lords; however, Lord Lovat declined the offer and in 1945 joined the Government as Parliamentary Under-Secretary of State for Foreign Affairs, "becoming responsible for the functions of the Ministry of Economic Warfare when these were taken over by the Foreign Office", resigning upon Winston Churchill's election defeat. In 1946 he was made a Commander of the Venerable Order of Saint John. His formal retirement from the army came on 16 June 1962, he retained the honorary rank of brigadier.

Lord Lovat's involvement in politics continued throughout his life, in the House of Lords where he spoke on Scottish Affairs and served in the Inverness County Council for the next forty-two years where he pressed for modernising improvements. He also devoted much of his time to the family estates of 250,000 acres in the Highlands and to Fraser Clan affairs. He bred a pedigree herd of shorthorn cattle and was an international judge of cattle travelling widely to Canada, America, Latin America and Australia in that regard. He lectured on agronomy and loved racing. He was chieftain of Lovat Shinty Club, the local shinty team which bears his family name. Lord Lovat experienced a great deal of sadness in his final years; two of his sons predeceased him in accidents within days of each other. In 1994, a year before his death, the family's traditional residence, Beaufort Castle, was sold by his eldest son, Simon Fraser, to pay inheritance taxes.

Lord Lovat's second son, Kim, played the pipes at Lord Lovat's funeral.

== Media ==
The Longest Day, a 1962 film based on the book of the same name, features "Lord Lovat", played by Peter Lawford.

There is some suggestion that the charlatan commando character "Trimmer" in Evelyn Waugh's Sword of Honour trilogy of novels is based on Lovat. Lovat was closely associated with Waugh's forced resignation from the Commandos, which is the subject of an exchange of correspondence between them which Waugh pasted into his war diaries. In an article in Standpoint magazine, Paul Johnson wrote:

...by vindictive cunning of a high order, [Waugh] manages to foist the ultra-plebeian Trimmer on the exquisite person of Brigadier Lord Lovat, head of the clan Fraser, who had his own family regiment and was known from his looks as "the upper-class Erroll Flynn". "Shimi" Lovat committed the unforgivable sin of ejecting Waugh from the Commandos since, he told me, "he had made himself so hated by his men they would have shot him in the back as soon as they went into action." So Waugh made Lovat into Trimmer. Once, when I happened to say a word in praise of Waugh, "Shimi" let forth a scream of rage and pain: "Do you realise, thanks to that monster, I am Trimmer?"

Lovat's memoir March Past, covering his war experiences, was published by Weidenfeld & Nicolson in 1978.

== Family ==
Simon Christopher Joseph Fraser, Master of Lovat and 15th Lord Lovat (9 July 1911 – 16 March 1995), was the son and eldest child of Simon Joseph Fraser, 14th Baron Lovat (25 November 1871 – 18 February 1933), and the Hon. Laura Lister (12 January 1892 – 24 March 1965). His younger brother was the Hon. Sir Hugh Charles Patrick Joseph Fraser (23 January 1918 – 6 March 1984).

He married Rosamond Delves Broughton on 10 October 1938. They had six children:

- Simon Augustine Fraser, Master of Lovat (28 August 1939 – 26 March 1994) married Virginia Grose in 1972. They had four children: the Hon. Violet Fraser (b. 1972), the Hon. Honor Fraser (b. 1973), Simon Christopher Joseph Fraser, 16th Lord Lovat (b. 1977), and the Hon. John Fraser (b. 1984). Died at the age of 54 of a heart attack while hunting on the family estate at Beaufort Castle.
- Hon. Fiona Mary Fraser (born 6 July 1941) married Robin Richard Allen in 1982 and have no issue.
- Hon. Annabel Thérèse Fraser (15 October 1942 – 13 September 2022). She married Hugh William Mackay, 14th Baron Reay on 14 September 1964 and divorced in 1978. They had three children including Æneas Simon Mackay, 15th Baron Reay.
- Hon. Kimball Ian Maurice Fraser (4 January 1946 – 30 May 2020). He married Joanna North on 18 October 1975 and had three sons.
- Hon. Alastair Hugh Joseph Fraser (14 November 1947 – 20 February 2011) married Drusilla Montgomerie on 1 May 1976 and had four children. Died of cancer at the age of 63.
- Hon. Andrew Matthew Roy Fraser (24 February 1952 – 15 March 1994) married Lady Charlotte Greville, daughter of David Greville, 8th Earl of Warwick, and had two daughters: Daisy Rosamond Fraser (b. 1985) and Laura Alfreda Fraser (b. 1987). Died after being attacked by buffalo in Tanzania.

The 15th Lord Lovat's first son and heir Simon Augustine Fraser, Master of Lovat, and his fourth son Andrew predeceased him in 1994 within days of each other. The 15th Lord Lovat then died a year later in 1995. The title then passed to his grandson Simon Christopher Fraser, who became the 16th Lord Lovat.

Political offices
Preceded by George Hall	Parliamentary Under-Secretary of State for Foreign Affairs; 1945; With: Lord Dunglass	Succeeded by Hector McNeil
Preceded by Lord Selborne	Minister of Economic Warfare; 1945	Office abolished
Honorary titles
Preceded by Simon Joseph Fraser	MacShimidh; 1933–1995	Succeeded by Simon Fraser
Peerage of Scotland
Preceded by Simon Joseph Fraser	Lord Lovat; 1933–1995	Succeeded by Simon Fraser
Peerage of the United Kingdom
Preceded by Simon Joseph Fraser	Baron Lovat; 1933–1995	Succeeded by Simon Fraser
