= Daniele Varè =

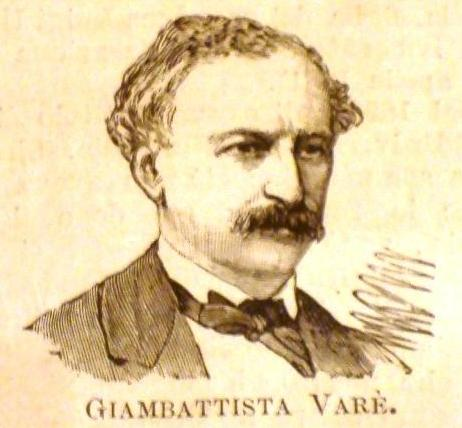
Varè's father, Giambattista.

Daniele Varè (12 January 1880 – 27 February 1956) was an Italian expatriate diplomat and author, most famous for the China-set novel The Maker of Heavenly Trousers (republished in 2012 by Penguin Modern Classics). He is also remembered for Laughing Diplomat (John Murray, 1938), his autobiography as Italian diplomat.

== Biography ==
Varè's father, Giovanni Battista Varè (1817–1884), was a lawyer, of the L'Indipendente newspaper and an associate of Daniele Manin: hence as an Italian nationalist he was exiled from northern Italy by the then Austrian authorities ruling his native Venice. Daniele Varè's mother, Elizabeth Frances Chalmers, was a daughter of a Scotsman, John Inglis Chalmers, of Aldbar Castle near Brechin.

Varè spent his early years in Britain, travelling to Italy with his mother at the age of eleven. His mother had met Giambattista Varè in Rome in 1872 and married him in July 1874 at St George's, Hanover Square. Young Daniele entered the Italian Diplomatic Service in 1907 and was first assigned to China in 1912. He served as Italian Minister (Ambassador) to the Republican Government in China between 1927 and 1931. In Beijing he had as a subordinate Galeazzo Ciano, later to become Benito Mussolini's Minister of Foreign Affairs. He also served in Geneva, Copenhagen, and Luxembourg.

In 1932, while serving as Ambassador to Denmark, Varè was forced to resign by Mussolini, as were many other Italian diplomats. Hence, he first published his books in English and only later in Italian.

== Personal life ==
In 1909, in Knightsbridge, Varè married Elizabeth Maryons Stansfeld. Their daughter Marguerite was born in 1911 in Italy. Another daughter, Diana, was born in 1915 in China, and in 1946 married David Grose, an English stockbroker. They had three daughters, Benedetta, Virginia, and Talia. In 1972, their grand-daughter Virginia Grose married Simon Fraser, Master of Lovat, and with him had four children, including Simon Fraser, 16th Lord Lovat.

== Works ==
His novels include: The Maker of Heavenly Trousers (Der Schneider himmlischer Hosen) (1926), was followed by The Gate of Happy Sparrows (1937) and The Temple of Costly Experience (Der Tempel der kostbaren Weisheit) (1939), set in the early twentieth century in the Chinese capital of Peking, where the author spent two lengthy periods serving as a diplomat in the Italian Legation as a First Secretary (1912–1920) and later, Minister (1927–1931).

Other works were: Laughing Diplomat (1938) Princess in Tartary: a Play for Marionettes in Two Acts and an Epilogue (1940); Gaia Melodia. Romanzo (1944); The Last of the Empresses and the Passing from the Old China to the New (1947); Twilight of the Kings (1948) - memoir/reminiscences; The Two Imposters (1949) - essays/journals/memoir; The Doge's Ring (1949); Ghosts of the Spanish Steps (1955) - essays/pen portraits; Ghosts of the Rialto - essays/pen portraits (1956); Palma (1957).

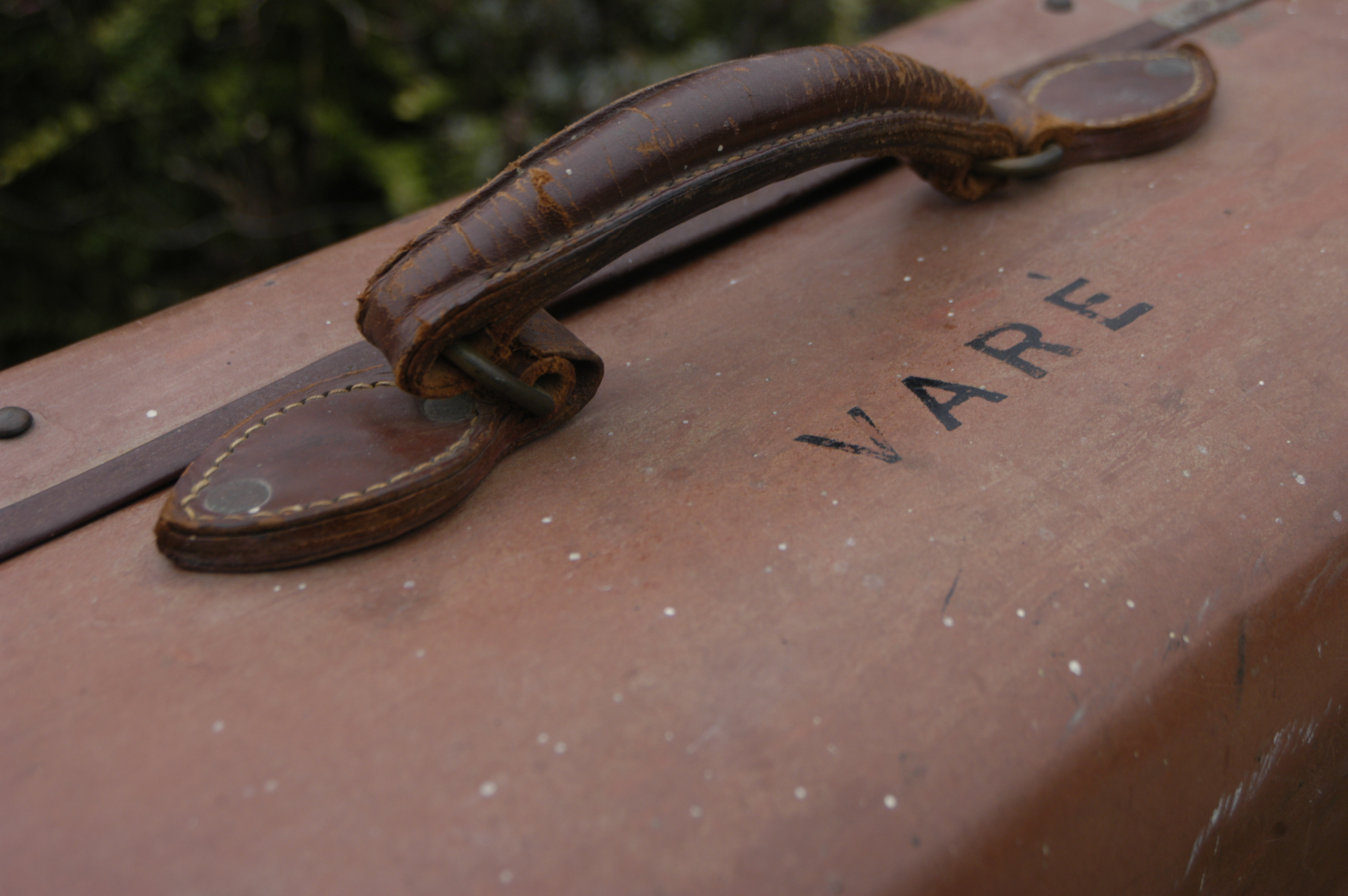
Suitcase that belonged to Daniele Varè, or his wife, and then to his daughter.
