= Tessa Keswick =

British journalist and political policy adviser (1942–2022)

The Honourable Tessa Keswick
- In her garden in Wiltshire
- Born: Annabel Thérèse Fraser; 15 October 1942; Beaufort Castle, Scotland
- Died: 13 September 2022 (aged 79); Marylebone, London, England
- Education: Woldingham School
- Spouse(s): Hugh Mackay, 14th Lord Reay (div.) Sir Henry Keswick (m. 1985)
- Children: 3, including Aeneas
- Father: Simon Fraser, 15th Lord Lovat

Annabel Thérèse Keswick, Lady Keswick (née Fraser; 15 October 1942 – 13 September 2022), was a Scottish lady from the Fraser family who married Lord Reay and then Sir Henry Keswick. She was influential in British politics as the special advisor to Kenneth Clarke and then as director of the Centre for Policy Studies. She was Chancellor of the University of Buckingham from 2014 to 2020.

== Professional career ==
Keswick served as a special policy advisor to Kenneth Clarke from 1989 to 1995. During that time she worked at the Department of State for Health, the Department of Education and Science, the Home Office and HM Treasury.

After resigning from this position in 1995, she became executive director of the Centre for Policy Studies, eventually becoming its deputy chairman from January 2004 until April 2017. In this role she contributed to, commissioned and published over 100 public policy pamphlets on the European Union, the Constitution, law and order, education, health, tax and regulatory affairs and women's issues. She wrote on these subjects for most of the national newspapers, and appeared on radio and on television.

== Journalism ==
Keswick has contributed articles for The Daily Telegraph, The New Statesman, Financial Times, and The Spectator, among other publications.

== Books ==
On 9 January 2020, Keswick published The Colour of the Sky After Rain, about her impression of the Chinese people and their culture after decades of travel to China and the Far East.

== Other positions ==
In September 2013, Keswick was appointed a director of Daily Mail and General Trust. In the same month, she was elected chancellor of the University of Buckingham, a position she held until 2020.

She was a patron of the British Museum, the National Gallery and the Victoria and Albert Museum. In July 2007 she became a Fellow of King's College London.

== Personal life and death ==
Keswick was born at Beaufort Castle, near Kiltarlity, Inverness-shire on 15 October 1942, the daughter of Simon Fraser, 15th Lord Lovat and Rosamond Delves (née Broughton). She was married firstly to Hugh Mackay, 14th Lord Reay, and then to businessman Sir Henry Keswick from 1985.

Keswick died of ovarian cancer in Marylebone, London, on 13 September 2022, aged 79.
