= Jamie Borwick, 5th Baron Borwick =

British businessman (born 1955)

The Right Honourable The Lord Borwick
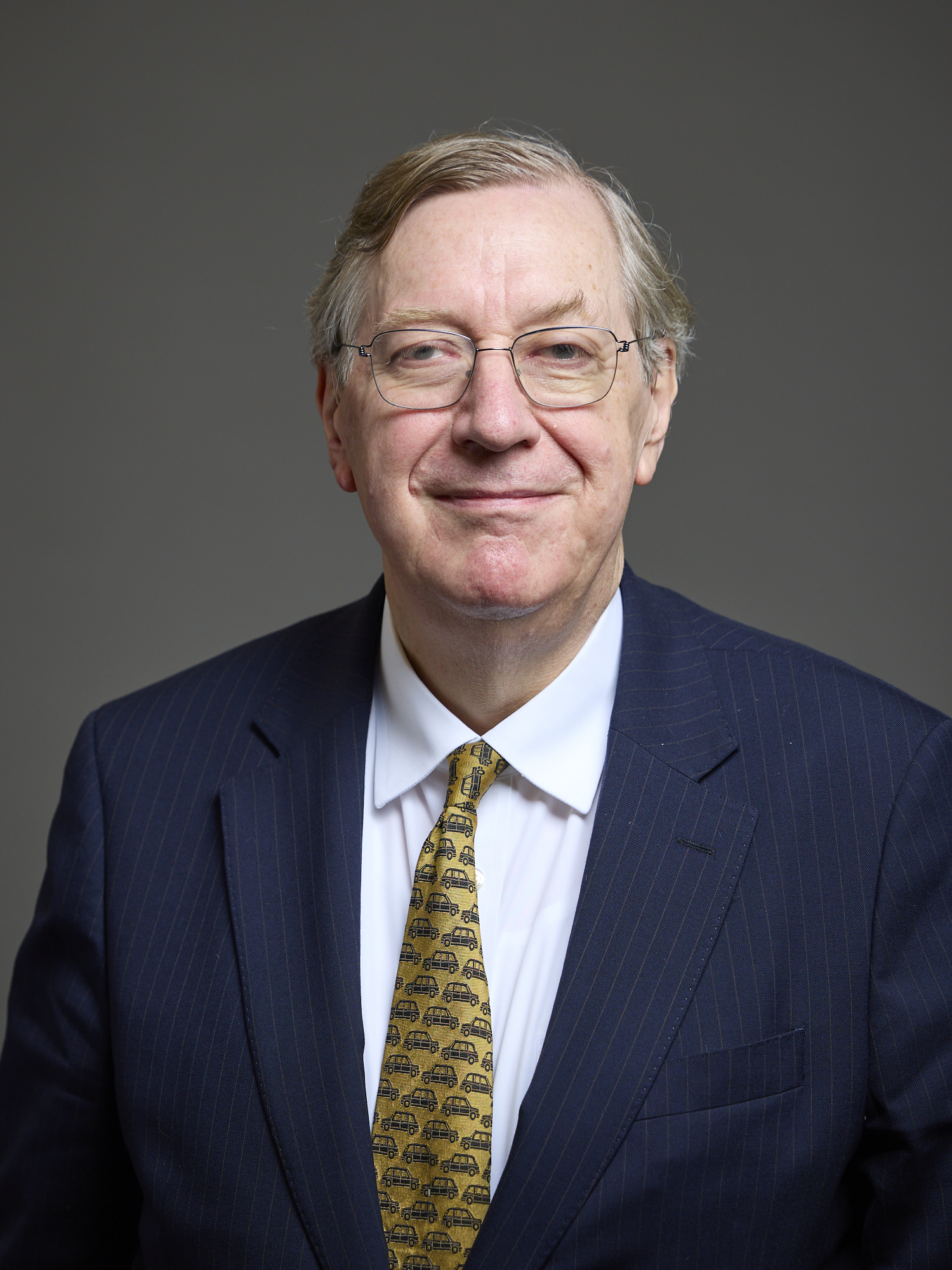
- Official portrait, 2026

Member of the House of Lords
- Lord Temporal
- Elected Hereditary Peer; 26 July 2013 – 29 April 2026
- By-election: 2013
- Preceded by: The 14th Lord Reay

Personal details
- Born: Geoffrey Robert James Borwick; 7 March 1955 (age 71)
- Party: Conservative
- Spouse: Victoria Poore (m. 1981)
- Children: 4, including Thomas
- Parent(s): The Hon. Robin Borwick; The Hon. Patricia McAlpine
- Education: Sandroyd School; Eton College
- Occupation: Businessman

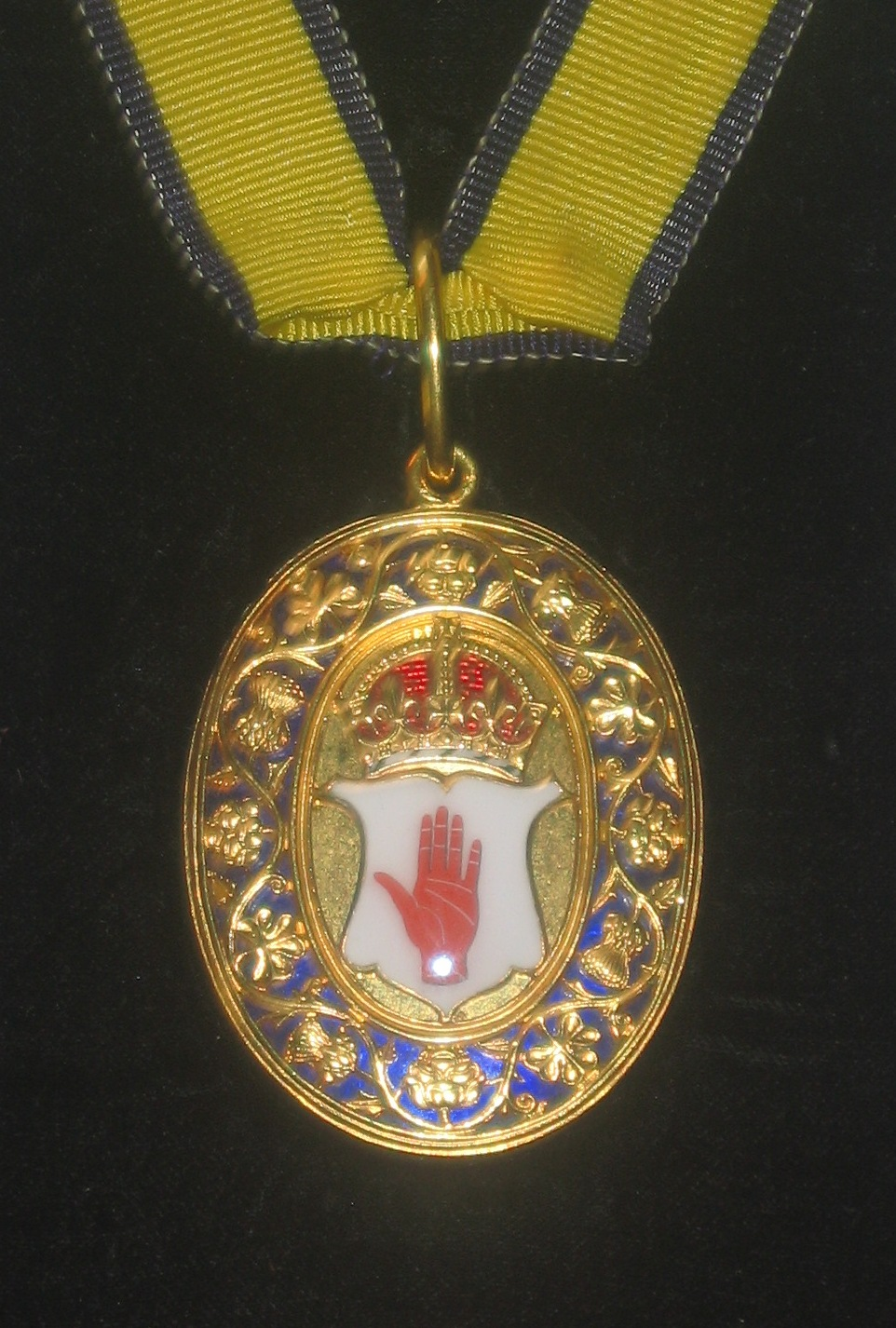
Baronet's badge

Geoffrey Robert James Borwick, 5th Baron Borwick (born 7 March 1955), is a British businessman, hereditary peer and former member of the House of Lords.

== Early life ==
Borwick was born on 7 March 1955 as the elder son of the Hon. Robin Borwick (1927–2003) and the Hon. Patricia née McAlpine (1927–2009) (only daughter of Lord McAlpine of Moffatt). He was educated at Sandroyd School then Eton College.

He succeeded to the family barony and baronetcy in 2007, upon the death of his uncle, the 4th Baron Borwick, MC.

== Career ==
Borwick became Chief Executive (from 1987 to 2001) of Manganese Bronze Holdings plc, best known for making London Taxis, and then chairman until 2003.

Borwick was founder and owner of electric truck producer Modec in Coventry in 2004. The company entered administration in March 2011 with debts of over £40m. He was Chairman of Route2Mobility Ltd, funding wheelchairs and scooters for disabled people as part of the UK's Motability scheme, until October 2010. He was also a deputy chairman of the board of British Low Carbon Vehicle Partnership.

Lord Borwick's other business appointments include as Chairman of Countryside Properties (Bicester) Ltd, and Chairman of Federated Trust Corporation Ltd. He was a non-executive Director of Hansa Trust plc from 1984 until 2012.

Elected in the hereditary peers by-election of July 2013, replacing the late Lord Reay, Lord Borwick sat on the Conservative benches in the House of Lords.

== Philanthropy ==
Lord Borwick is a Trustee of the Royal Brompton and Harefield Hospitals Charity, having retired from the British Lung Foundation after 2 terms of 6 years as Trustee.

== Personal life ==
In 1981, Borwick married Victoria Poore, later a Conservative member of parliament, London Assembly Member, and Deputy Mayor of London. They have three sons and a daughter:
Their eldest son, the Hon. Edwin Borwick, is heir apparent to the family titles and their second son, the Hon. Thomas Borwick, is the Conservative Party digital media strategist, who previously worked for Vote Leave.

=== Arms ===
Coat of arms of Jamie Borwick, 5th Baron Borwick
| Crest Upon a Mount Proper in front of a Staff raguly erect Azure a Stag browsing Or attired Sable. Escutcheon Argent three Escarbuncles fesswise Sable between as many Bears’ Heads erased of the last muzzled Or. Supporters On either side a Bear Sable muzzled and charged on the shoulder with an Escarbuncle Or. Motto Fugit |

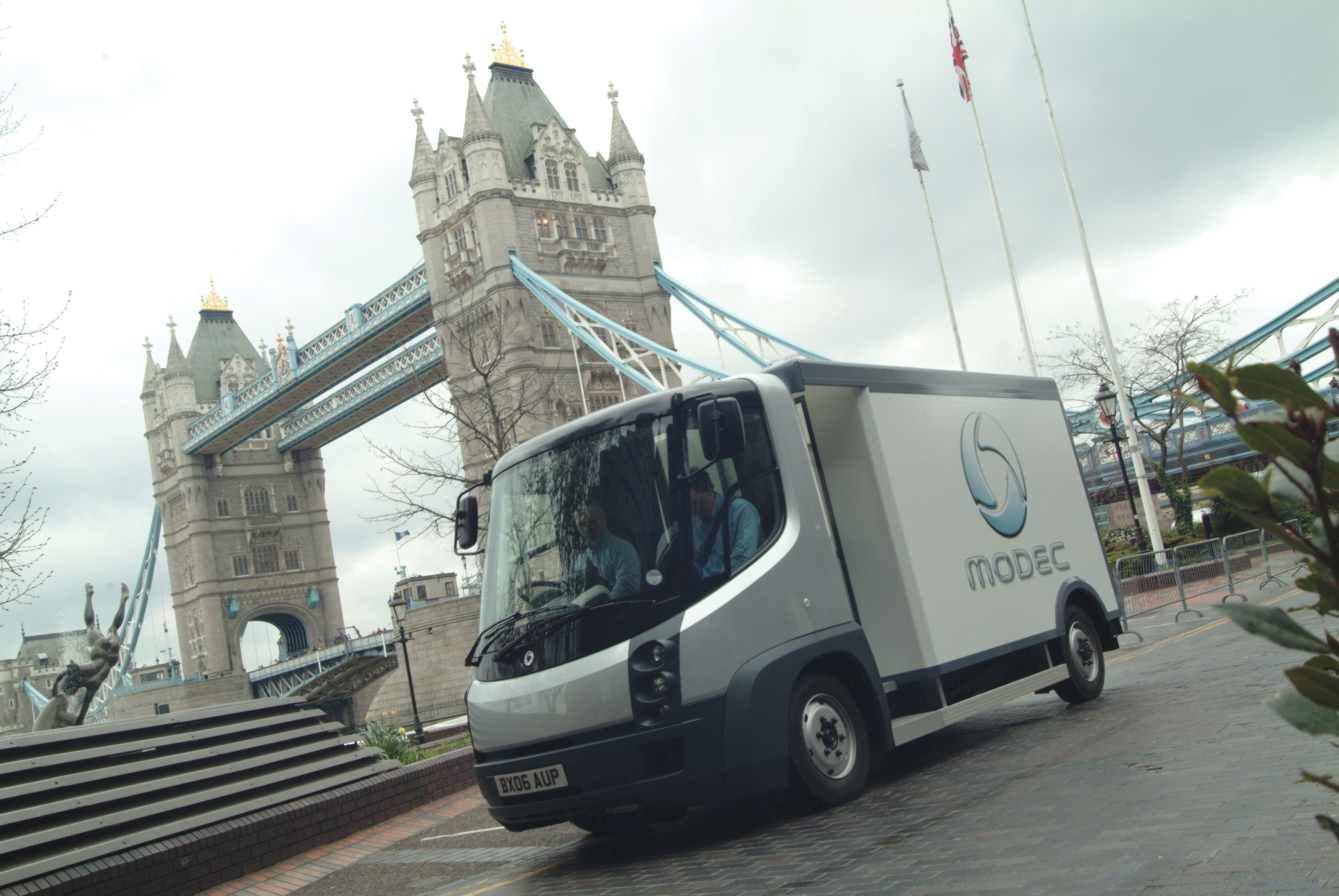
Electric Modec van near Tower Bridge

== See also ==
Peerage of the United Kingdom
| Preceded by James Borwick (4th Baron) | Baron Borwick; 2007–present | Incumbent; Heir apparent: Hon. Edwin Borwick |
Parliament of the United Kingdom
| Preceded by The Lord Reay | Elected hereditary peer to the House of Lords under the House of Lords Act 1999; 2013–2026 | Position abolished under the House of Lords (Hereditary Peers) Act 2026 |
Baronetage of the United Kingdom
| Preceded by James Borwick (4th Baronet) | Baronet (of Eden Lacy); 2007–present | Incumbent; Heir apparent: Hon. Edwin Borwick |
