= Hugh Mackay, 14th Lord Reay =

British politician (1937–2013)

The Right Honourable The Lord Reay
- Reay in 2011

Parliamentary Under-Secretary of State for Trade and Industry
- In office 22 May 1991 – 14 April 1992
- Prime Minister: John Major
- Preceded by: Post vacant
- Succeeded by: The Baroness Denton of Wakefield

Lord-in-waiting Government Whip
- In office 24 July 1989 – 21 May 1991
- Prime Minister: Margaret Thatcher
- Preceded by: The Earl of Arran
- Succeeded by: The Earl Howe

Member of the European Parliament
- In office 1 January 1973 – 16 July 1979
- Constituency: Appointed by Parliament

Member of the House of Lords
- Lord Temporal
- Hereditary peerage 9 October 1964 – 11 November 1999
- Preceded by: The 13th Lord Reay
- Succeeded by: Seat abolished
- Elected Hereditary Peer; 11 November 1999 – 10 May 2013
- Election: 1999
- Preceded by: Seat established
- Succeeded by: The 5th Baron Borwick

Personal details
- Born: Hugh William Mackay; 19 July 1937
- Died: 10 May 2013 (aged 75)
- Party: Crossbencher (1964–1966); Liberal (1966–1971); Crossbencher (1971–1972); Conservative (1972–2013)
- Spouse(s): Tessa Fraser (div.); Victoria Warrender
- Children: 5
- Relatives: See Clan Mackay
- Education: Eton College; Christ Church, Oxford

Hugh William Mackay, 14th Lord Reay, Baron Mackay (19 July 1937 – 10 May 2013), was a British politician and Conservative member of the House of Lords. He was the only male Lord of Parliament to sit in the House of Lords following the abolition of the automatic right of all British hereditary peers to sit in the House of Lords in 1999, the only female being The Lady Saltoun.

== Biography ==
Lord Reay was the only son of Aeneas Alexander Mackay, 13th Lord Reay. He was educated at Eton College and Christ Church, Oxford.

He succeeded to the title upon his father's death in 1963, sitting in the House of Lords first as a cross-bencher, then as a Liberal, and finally, from 1972, as a Conservative. He championed causes from the abolition of capital punishment to restrictions on onshore wind farms.

He sat as an appointed Member of the European Parliament from 1973 until the first elections in 1979. He also served as a delegate to the Council of Europe, living at the family's Dutch estates in Ophemert.

He subsequently was appointed as a House of Lords whip in 1989 by Margaret Thatcher. In 1991, he was moved by her successor, John Major, to the Department of Trade and Industry as a Parliamentary Under Secretary of State, but he left the government at the 1992 general election.

With the passage of the House of Lords Act 1999, Lord Reay along with almost all other hereditary peers lost his automatic right to sit in the House of Lords, however, he was one of the 92 elected hereditary peers to remain in the House of Lords pending completion of House of Lords reform.

Lord Reay was the hereditary Clan Chief of Clan Mackay, and Lord of Ophemert and Zennewijnen in the Netherlands.

== Family ==
Lord Reay was married twice. With his first wife, the Honourable Tessa Fraser, a daughter of Lord Lovat (she then became wife of Henry Keswick), he had two sons and one daughter. With his second wife, Victoria Isabella Warrender, youngest daughter of the late 1st Baron Bruntisfield, he had two daughters Antonia and Isabelle.

He was succeeded by his elder son, Aeneas Mackay, Master of Reay (born 20 March 1965), a banker, who married, on 14 January 2010, Mia Ruulio, elder daughter of Markus Ruulio of Helsinki. His heir is his son, the Honourable Alexander Shimi Markus Mackay (born 21 April 2010).

== Links ==
- Profile, mapsstatsandpolitics.talktalk.net; accessed 26 March 2016.

== Notes ==
Peerage of Scotland
Preceded by Aeneas Mackay	Lord Reay; 1963–2013; Member of the House of Lords (1964–1999)	Succeeded by Aeneas Mackay
Parliament of the United Kingdom
New office created by the House of Lords Act 1999	Elected hereditary peer to the House of Lords under the House of Lords Act 1999; 1999–2013	Succeeded by The Lord Borwick
Dutch nobility
Preceded by Aeneas Mackay	Baron Mackay; 1963–2013	Succeeded by Aeneas Mackay
