= Aeneas Mackay, 15th Lord Reay =

Scottish peer and corporate financer

The Right Honourable The Lord Reay
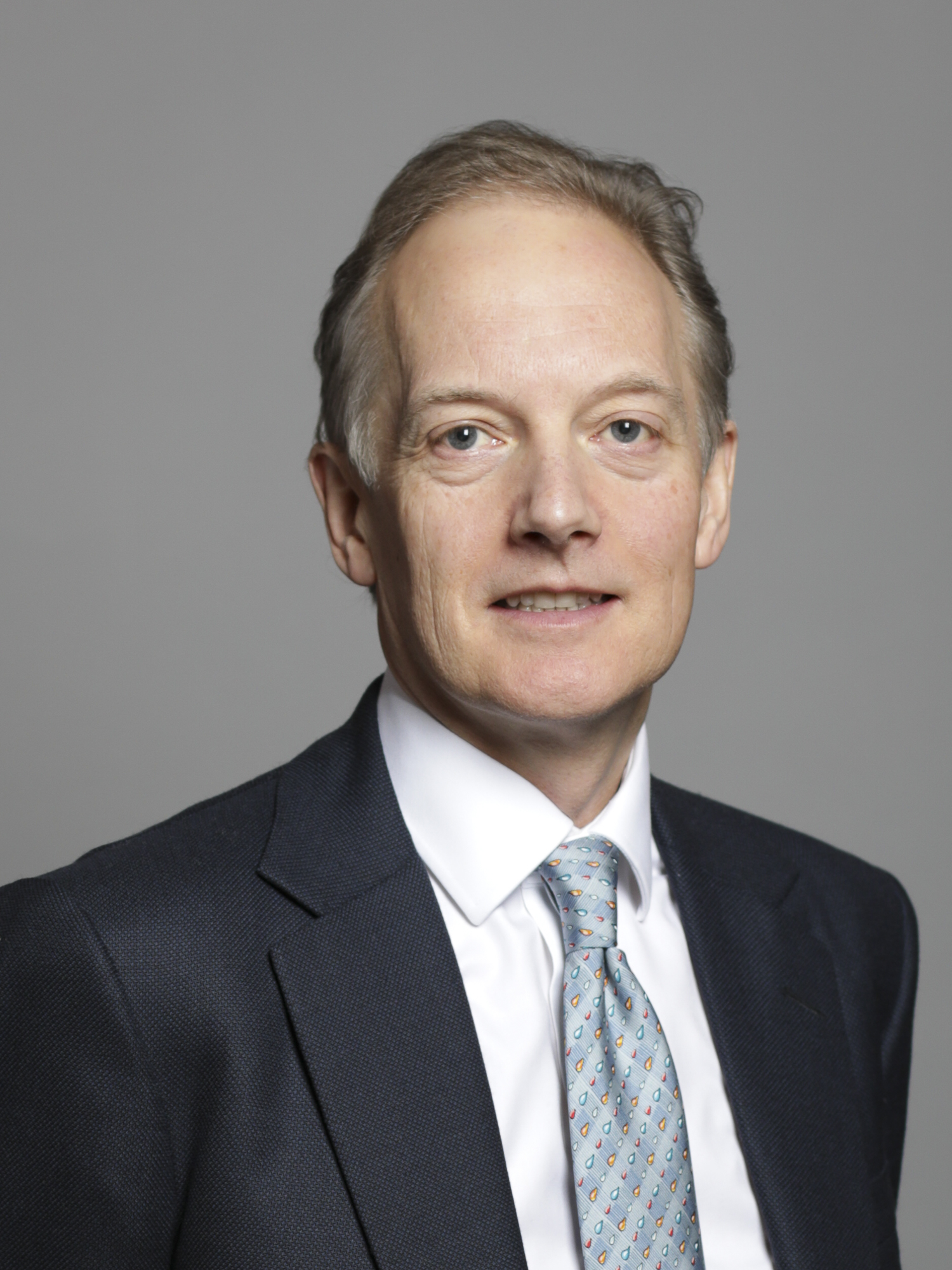
- Official portrait, 2020

Member of the House of Lords Lord Temporal
- Incumbent
- Life peerage 15 June 2026
- Elected Hereditary Peer; 28 January 2019 – 29 April 2026
- By-election: 2019
- Preceded by: The 7th Baron Skelmersdale
- Succeeded by: Seat abolished

Personal details
- Born: Aeneas Simon Mackay; 20 March 1965 (age 61) London, England
- Party: Conservative
- Education: Westminster School
- Alma mater: Brown University

Aeneas Simon Mackay, 15th Lord Reay, Baron Reay of Reay (pronounced "Ray"; Born 20 March 1965) is a British corporate financier who is also hereditary Clan Chief of Clan Mackay. He is a Scottish lord and baronet.

In May 2026, it was announced that Reay was to be given one of 26 new life peerages, returning him to the House of Lords after the coming into force of the House of Lords (Hereditary Peers) Act 2026.

Reay is also a Dutch nobleman as Baron Mackay van Ophemert and Zennewijnen, of Castle Ophemert.

== Early life and education ==
Reay was born in London, the eldest son of Hugh Mackay, 14th Lord Reay, and Hon. Annabel Thérèse Fraser, daughter of Simon Fraser, 15th Lord Lovat. He has a younger brother and a younger sister. His parents divorced in 1978; his father remarried to Hon. Victoria Isabella Warrender, daughter of Victor Warrender, 1st Baron Bruntisfield, and his mother remarried to Sir Henry Keswick. He has two half sisters from his father's second marriage.

He was educated at Westminster School and Brown University in Rhode Island.

== Career ==
Lord Reay was a founding partner of the corporate finance firm Montrose Partners.

Lord Reay was admitted to the House of Lords in January 2019, after winning a hereditary peers' by-election. He sat as a Conservative member of the House, and is a member of Lloyd's.

In 2023 the Clan Mackay inaugurated Aeneas Mackay as their chief at a ceremony at the Farr Stone, in north Sutherland, and in the presence of representatives from Clan-Mackay societies from Canada, the U.S.A, Germany and Scotland. The ceremony involved a religious blessing; readings of poetry and ancient documents; a recitation of the chief’s lineage; and the presentation to the chief of a dirk, staff and seal. The chief's seanchaidh led the ceremony, which included the participation of the Lord-Lieutenant of Sutherland and the High Chief of Clan Donald.

== Family ==
The then Master of Reay married to Mia Ruulio from Finland, elder daughter of Markus Ruulio, in 2010. Lord and Lady Reay live in Chelsea SW3 and Whittington Hall, and have three children:

- Alexander Mackay (b. 2010), styled Master of Reay;
- The Hon Iona Mackay (b. 2011);
- The Hon Harry Mackay (b. 2014).

== See also ==
- Clan Mackay
- Lords of Parliament

=== Further reading ===
- Burke's Peerage & Baronetage

Parliament of the United Kingdom
Preceded by The Lord Skelmersdale	Elected hereditary peer to the House of Lords under the House of Lords Act 1999; 2019–2026	Position abolished under the House of Lords (Hereditary Peers) Act 2026
Peerage of Scotland
Preceded by Hugh Mackay	Lord Reay; 2013–present	Incumbent; Heir apparent: Alexander Mackay; Master of Reay
Dutch nobility
Preceded by Hugh Mackay	Baron Mackay van Ophemert and Zennewijnen; 2013–present	Incumbent; Heir apparent: Alexander Mackay; Master of Reay
