= Baron Borwick =

Barony in the Peerage of the United Kingdom

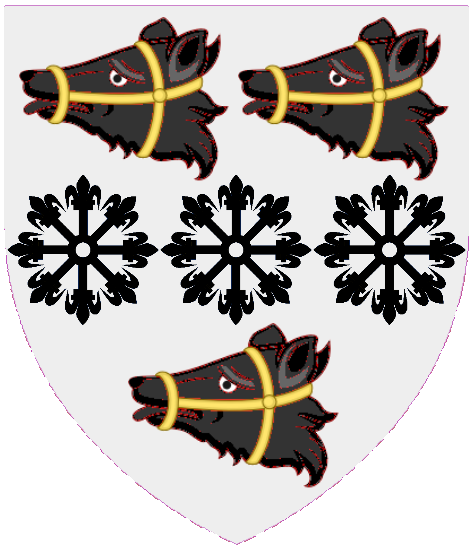
- Crest: Upon a mount Proper in front of a staff raguly erect Azure a stag browsing Or attired Sable.
- Shield: Argent three escarbuncles fesswise Sable between as many bears’ heads erased of the last muzzled Or.
- Supporters: On either side a bear Sable muzzled and charged on the shoulder with an escarbuncle Or.
- Motto: Fugit

Baron Borwick, of Hawkshead in the County of Lancaster, is a title in the Peerage of the United Kingdom. It was created on 20 July 1922 for the businessman Sir Robert Borwick, 1st Baronet. He was chairman of George Borwick & Sons Ltd, manufacturers of baking and custard powders. The company had been founded by his father George Borwick. Before his elevation to the peerage, Borwick had been created a baronet, of Eden Lacy in the Parish of Lazonby in the County of Cumberland, on 1 July 1916. His eldest son, the second Baron, was succeeded by his younger brother, the third Baron. The latter was succeeded by his son, the fourth Baron (who had four daughters). As of 2014 the titles are held by his nephew, the fifth Baron, who succeeded in 2007. Lord Borwick is the eldest son of Robin Borwick, third son of the third Baron. The family tomb is maintained at the Cimetières du Château in Nice.

== Barons Borwick (1922) ==
- Robert Hudson Borwick, 1st Baron Borwick (1845–1936)
- George Borwick, 2nd Baron Borwick (1880–1941)
- Robert Geoffrey Borwick, 3rd Baron Borwick (1886–1961)
- James Hugh Myles Borwick, 4th Baron Borwick (1917–2007)
- (Geoffrey Robert) James Borwick, 5th Baron Borwick (b. 1955)

The heir apparent is the present holder's son Edwin Dennis William Borwick (b. 1984).

=== Line of Succession ===
- Robert Hudson Borwick, 1st Baron Borwick (1845—1936)
  - George Borwick, 2nd Baron Borwick (1880—1941)
  - Robert Geoffrey Borwick, 3rd Baron Borwick (1886—1961)
    - James Hugh Myles Borwick, 4th Baron Borwick (1917—2007)
    - Robin Sandbach Borwick (1927—2003)
      - Geoffrey Robert James Borwick, 5th Baron Borwick (born 1955)
        - (1) Edwin Dennis William Borwick (b. 1984)
        - (2) Thomas James Robert Borwick (b. 1987)
        - (3) William Borwick (b. 1997)
      - (4) Richard David Borwick (b. 1960)
        - (5) Christian Richard Sandbach Borwick (b. 1985)
        - (6) Fraser James Montgomery Borwick (b. 1992)
        - (7) Sebastian Steven Brockton Borwick (b. 2001)
