= Poore baronets =

Title in the Baronetage of Great Britain

- Poore baronets of Rushall
- Creation date: 1795
- Status: dormant
- Former seat: Until 1838, the family seat was the manor of Rushall, Wiltshire.
- Motto: Pauper, non in spe, Poor, but not in hope
- Arms: Argent a fess azure between three mullets gules

The Poore baronetcy, of Rushall in the County of Wiltshire, is a dormant title in the Baronetage of Great Britain. It was created on 8 July 1795 for John Methuen Poore, younger son of the judge and Member of Parliament Edward Poore, who had married Barbara Methuen, heiress of Paul Methuen of Bradford-on-Avon. There was a special remainder, failing heirs male of his own, to his elder brother Edward Poore and the heirs male of his body.

== Poore baronets, of Rushall (1795) ==
- Sir John Methuen Poore, 1st Baronet (1745–1820)
- Sir Edward Poore, 2nd Baronet (1795–1838)
- Sir Edward Poore, 3rd Baronet (1826–1893)
- Sir Richard Poore, 4th Baronet (1853–1930)
- Sir Edward Poore, 5th Baronet (1894–1938). He settled in Argentina.
- Sir Herbert Edward Poore, 6th Baronet (1930–2004)
- Sir Roger Ricardo Poore, 7th Baronet (1930–2005). His name did not appear on the Official Roll of the Baronetage.
- Sir Fernando Nasionceno Poore, presumed 8th Baronet (born 1964), nephew and heir of the 7th Baronet.

Baronetage of Great Britain
Preceded by Hamlyn baronets	Poore baronets of Rushall; 8 July 1795	Succeeded by Burges baronets
