= Honor Fraser =

Scottish fashion model

- Born: 1973 (age 52–53); UK
- Spouse: Stavros Merjos (m. 2004)

Honor Fraser (born 1973) is a Scottish art dealer and former fashion model. She is the sister of Simon Fraser, 16th Lord Lovat and chief of Clan Fraser of Lovat, and the granddaughter of British Commando Simon Fraser, 15th Lord Lovat. She was brought up at the family seat Beaufort Castle in Scotland.

She left St. Mary's School, Calne with three A Levels. After school she began an internship at British Vogue, where it was suggested that she try modelling. Fraser was the cover girl on the Bryan Ferry & Roxy Music compilation album More Than This, released in 1995.

Her first magazine cover was for French Elle (11 March 1996). From 1997 to 2002, she wrote a column for the Scottish magazine Spectrum.

Fraser married Stavros Merjos in 2004. She lives in Marina del Rey, California, and owns an art gallery, Honor Fraser Inc., in Los Angeles.

== Sources ==
- Honor Fraser's London Fashion Week, Andrew Barron, 1998, archived from the original on 31 January 2009
