= William St. Clair, 6th Baron of Roslin =

Thirteenth-century Scottish noble

William St. Clair
- Baron of Roslin
- Sinclair, Baron of Roslin coat of arms
- Successor: Henry St Clair
- Died: 1297
- Noble family: Clan Sinclair
- Spouse: Agnes Dunbar (maybe)
- Father: Robert de Saint-Clair or William St. Clair
- Mother: Eleanor of Dreux or unknown

William St. Clair (died 1297), 6th Baron of Roslin, was a Scottish nobleman of the late 13th century.

== Origins ==
According to Roland Saint-Clair, writing in the late 19th century, the "best" theory as to the origin of William St. Clair, is that found in the Genealogie of the Sainteclaires of Rosslyn manuscript which was written in 1690 by Father Richard Augustine Hay (1661 – c. 1736). According to this manuscript, William St. Clair was the second son of Robert de Saint-Clair in Normandy, who had married Eleanor who, in turn, was the relict of Hugh IV, Lord of Châteauneuf, and daughter of Robert II, Count of Dreux in France, by second wife Yolande de Coucy. Roland Saint-Clair also stated that Van Bassan's History of the St. Clairs is "considerably at variance with contemporary annals". The Oxford Dictionary of National Biography and People of Medieval Scotland do not support the parentage of William, stating that William was the son of another William, and the previous holders of Roslin were unrelated to the St. Clairs.

== Sheriffdoms ==
According to Bernard Burke, William St. Clair, was made sheriff of the County of Edinburgh for life in 1271, and this date was also given by historian Will Grant. However, according to Alexander Nisbet's Memorial of the ancient family of St Clair of Roslin, he became sheriff of the shire of Edinburgh in 1278 which was the 30th year of Alexander III of Scotland. The Exchequer Rolls of Scotland also show William St. Clair as being sheriff of various shires from 1264 to 1290, including: Haddington (1264–66), Linlithgow (1264), Edinburgh (1266), Dumfries (1288), Edinburgh (1288–90) and Linlithgow (1290).

== Other offices ==
Early in 1279 Alexander III, King of Scots appointed William St. Clair as guardian of Alexander, Prince of Scotland who, in turn, was the nephew of Edward I of England. A charter of 1280 is the first evidence of the St. Clairs' connection with Roslin, and it is not clear if the people who held the property before then were of the same surname. Around the same time William St. Clair acquired the Knights Templar lands of Gourton from Walter fitz Stephen de Meliville. William St. Clair sat in the Scots Parliament at Scone on 5 February 1283–84. In 1285, William St. Clair was one of the members of the Scottish embassy to France that was tasked with escorting back the queen-elect, Yolande of Dreux, daughter of Robert IV, Count of Dreux and Beatrix, only daughter of John, Count of Monfort. William is also known to have been, in 1290, acting as justiciar of Galloway.

== Wars of Scottish Independence ==
In 1291, William St. Clair was appointed to take fealties in Galloway and in 1292, he was ordered by Edward I of England to take the fealty of the Bishop of Whithorn and Galloway. Later in 1292, William St. Clair appears as the witness to a charter by John, Abbot of Newbattle in favor of William Bisset. He was also a supporter of John Balliol as competitor for the Scottish Crown and was present at Newcastle upon Tyne when Balliol swore fealty to King Edward. However, according to Patrick Fraser Tytler, William St. Clair was among the Scots who defeated the English at the Siege of Dunbar in 1296, but also that the Scots were soon after defeated by the English at the Battle of Dunbar in 1296 where many of them were taken prisoner. They were later permitted to support Edward I of England in his wars in France, as hostages, but Rotuli Scotiae shows that Sir William de St. Clair was among those who were sent as prisoners to the Tower of London. The History of the St. Clairs states that he was also one of the victorious leaders at the Battle of Roslin in 1302 or 1303 where the English were defeated.

== Family ==
William St. Clair, may have been "the Seemly St. Clair" who married Agnes Dunbar, daughter of Patrick Dunbar, Earl of March. On 7 April 1299, Edward I of England issued two years' protection for Amicia, widow of William de St. Clair, dwelling by the king's leave in the county of Edinburgh. William St. Clair is known to have left the following children:

1. Sir Henry Sinclair, 7th Baron of Roslin (heir and successor)
2. William Sinclair, who was the Bishop of Dunkeld and the King's Bishop
3. Gregory Sinclair, ancestor of the Sinclairs of Longformacus
4. Annabel Sinclair, who married, firstly, Robert Bisset and, secondly, Sir David Wemyss

== See also ==
- Lord Sinclair
- Earl of Caithness
- Clan Sinclair
- Lord Herdmanston

Peerage of Scotland
Preceded by Unrecorded by contemporary records	Barony of Roslin; 1270–1297	Succeeded by Henry St Clair
