= Robert de Saint-Clair =

13th century French noble

Robert de Saint-Clair (Note: Also known as Robert de Chaumont) (d. c. 1269), Lord of Saint-Clair, Châteauneuf and Sorel, was a French nobleman.

== Life ==
Robert married Eleanor of Dreux, the widow of Hugues IV de Châteauneuf and daughter of Robert II, Count of Dreux, and second wife Yolande de Coucy. They had a son, Robert. Eleanor died in 1248.

He remarried Isabelle de Maillebois, Lady of Courville. Robert became Lord of Châteauneuf and Sorel in 1253, after the death of Jean de Châteauneuf, Eleanor's son from her previous marriage.

Robert died around 1269. Isabelle remarried in 1270 Geoffroy de Rochefort.

Robert's son, known as Robert the Younger, died in 1260 without issue.

According to Roland Saint-Clair, writing in the late 19th century, the "best" theory as to the origin of William St. Clair, 6th Baron of Roslin, is that found in the Genealogie of the Sainteclaires of Rosslyn manuscript which was written in 1690 by Father Richard Augustine Hay (1661 – c. 1736). According to this manuscript, William St. Clair was the second son of Robert de Saint-Clair in Normandy, who had married Eleanor who, in turn, was the relict of Hugh IV, Lord of Châteauneuf, and daughter of Robert II, Count of Dreux in France, by second wife Yolande de Coucy. Roland Saint-Clair also stated that Van Bassan's History of the St. Clairs is "considerably at variance with contemporary annals". The Oxford Dictionary of National Biography and People of Medieval Scotland do not support the parentage of William, stating that William was the son of another William, and the previous holders of Roslin were unrelated to the St. Clairs.
