= Morton, Edinburgh =

Locality in Edinburgh, Scotland

Coordinates: 55°53′50″N 3°11′38″W

Morton (Note: Previously spelt as Mortoun) is a locality and former barony, in Edinburgh, Scotland.

King Robert I of Scotland rewarded Henry St Clair for his bravery with the gift of Pentland, Pentland Moor, Morton and Mortonhall. The St Clair family disposed of the Morton estate in the late 16th century. In 1630, Morton came into the ownership of William Rigg, whose son sold it to the Porterfield family of Comiston; it was later bought back by another son, and in 1789 it was sold to the Trotter family. Morton House was constructed in the 17th century incorporating parts of an earlier structure.
