= Penicuik–Dalkeith Walkway =

Route in Midlothian in the east of Scotland

The Penicuik - Dalkeith Walkway, situated in the county of Midlothian in the east of Scotland, stretches for 9.5 miles along the former Edinburgh to Peebles railway. The route passes through many of Midlothian's historic towns and villages. The gentle gradient and nature of the route allow easy access for walkers, cyclists and horse riders to explore and enjoy the spectacular landscapes and visitor attractions of the county.

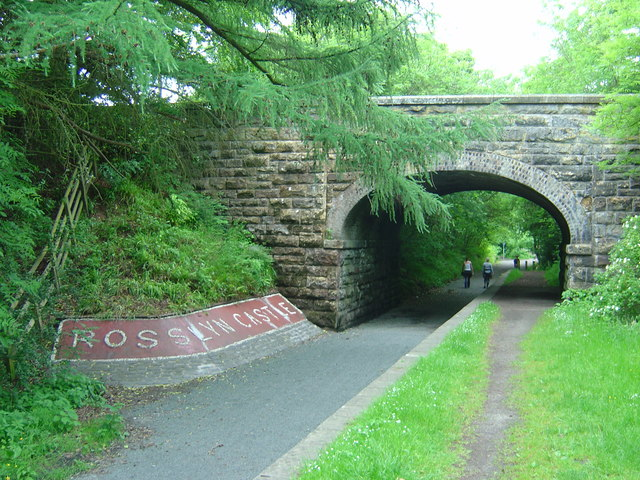
Former Rosslyn Castle station

== Route ==
From the car park in Penicuik follow the signage crossing the Bowstring Bridge through Beeslack Wood then cross the Firth viaduct. This bridge has 10 arches, is 66 feet high and each arch spans 35 feet. Roslin Glen Country Park will soon be reached followed by the disused Rosslyn Castle station. Shortly after this the route passes the small town of Rosewell then after a mile or so Bonnyrigg is reached. A few miles further on, after crossing over the A7 road, the outskirts of Eskbank are reached and the route continues past Eskbank Railway Station towards Dalkeith. It is, of course, possible to do the walk in the opposite direction.

The route used to go through Eskbank, and over the Glenesk viaduct and finish close to the A720 City of Edinburgh bypass. This section followed the trackbed of the old Waverley Line, which forms part of the Borders Railway which opened in September 2015.

== Nearby attractions ==
Many of Midlothian's places of interest can easily be reached from this walkway. These include: Rosslyn Chapel, The National Mining Museum, Dalhousie Castle, Newbattle Abbey, Ironmills Park and Dalkeith Country Park.

== Flora and fauna ==
Following the closure of the railway in 1967, nature has created an intricate wildlife corridor with a diverse range of habitats. A carpet of ferns, rushes and mosses dominates the embankments, while open verges are ideal for grasses and wildflowers. Buddleia, a butterfly favourite, readily colonises vacant spaces on walls and old platforms. The River North Esk meanders through the Esk Valley, flowing into the Firth of Forth at Musselburgh. At one time polluted by Midlothian's industrial past, the river now is home to a rich variety of wildlife, including the shy otter and the exotic-looking kingfisher. Pioneer species, birch and willow are the first to colonise open areas such as railway embankments. Both can live up to 100 years. At Beeslack Woods, 200-year-old oaks dominate the tree canopy. Oak and ash have been the most successful species within the river valley at Roslin Glen for over 400 years. At one time, this ancient seminatural woodland covered most of Midlothian. All these woodland habitats create a haven for wildlife.
