= William St Clair, 15th Baron of Roslin =

Scottish nobleman

William St Clair
- Baron of Roslin
- Baron of Roslin coat of arms
- Predecessor: William St Clair, 14th Baron of Roslin
- Successor: William St Clair, 16th Baron of Roslin
- Died: 1610
- Noble family: Clan Sinclair
- Father: William St Clair
- Mother: Lindeasy, daughter of the Laird of Egle

William St Clair (died 1610) was a Scottish nobleman and the 15th Baron of Roslin.

== Early life ==
He was the second son of William St Clair, 14th Baron of Roslin, who according to Alexander Nisbet's a System of Heraldry, had married Isabel, daughter of Ker of Cessford, but who according to Father Richard Augustine Hay's manuscript of 1690, had married Lindeasy, daughter of the Laird of Egle, brother of the Earl of Crawford, with whom he had William.

== Baron of Roslin ==
William St Clair, 15th Baron of Roslin was the first Hereditary Grandmaster of the Scottish Order of Freemasons which was constituted to him by charter. His elder brother, Edward, had conveyed to him the baronies of Roslin and Herbertshire in 1582. He built the great vaults and turnpikes of Roslin Castle. He also built one of the arches of the drawbridge and the tower of the dungeon. His initials appear in a stone dated 1596 which was when the work to the castle was finished.

In 1601, he received a charter from Henry Saintcler the Provost of Roslin for the church lands. In 1612, he resigned his lands lying within the earldom of Caithness.

== Family ==
He married Jean or Janet Edmonstone, daughter of the Laird Of that Ilk, with whom he had a son, William St Clair, 16th Baron of Roslin.

== See also ==
- Lord Sinclair
- Earl of Caithness
- Lord Herdmanston
