= Rosewell, Midlothian =

Village in Midlothian, Scotland

Coordinates: 55.8530°N 3.1356°W

Rosewell
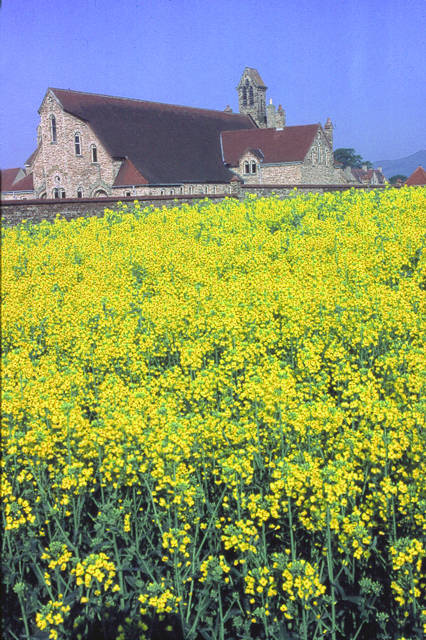
- St Matthew's Catholic Church

- Location within Midlothian
- Population: 2,020 (2020)
- OS grid reference: NT289627
- Council area: Midlothian
- Lieutenancy area: Midlothian
- Country: Scotland
- Sovereign state: United Kingdom
- Post town: ROSEWELL
- Postcode district: EH24
- Dialling code: 0131
- Police: Scotland
- Fire: Scottish
- Ambulance: Scottish
- UK Parliament: Midlothian
- Scottish Parliament: Midlothian North and Musselburgh

Rosewell is a former mining village in Midlothian, Scotland, east of Roslin and south-west of Bonnyrigg. The village is in the civil parish of Lasswade and was previously a separate ecclesiastical parish, but has its own Community Council, namely Rosewell and District.

The population of the village was 1,566 according to the 2011 Census but is significantly greater since the number of houses has doubled in the last 20 years.

== History ==
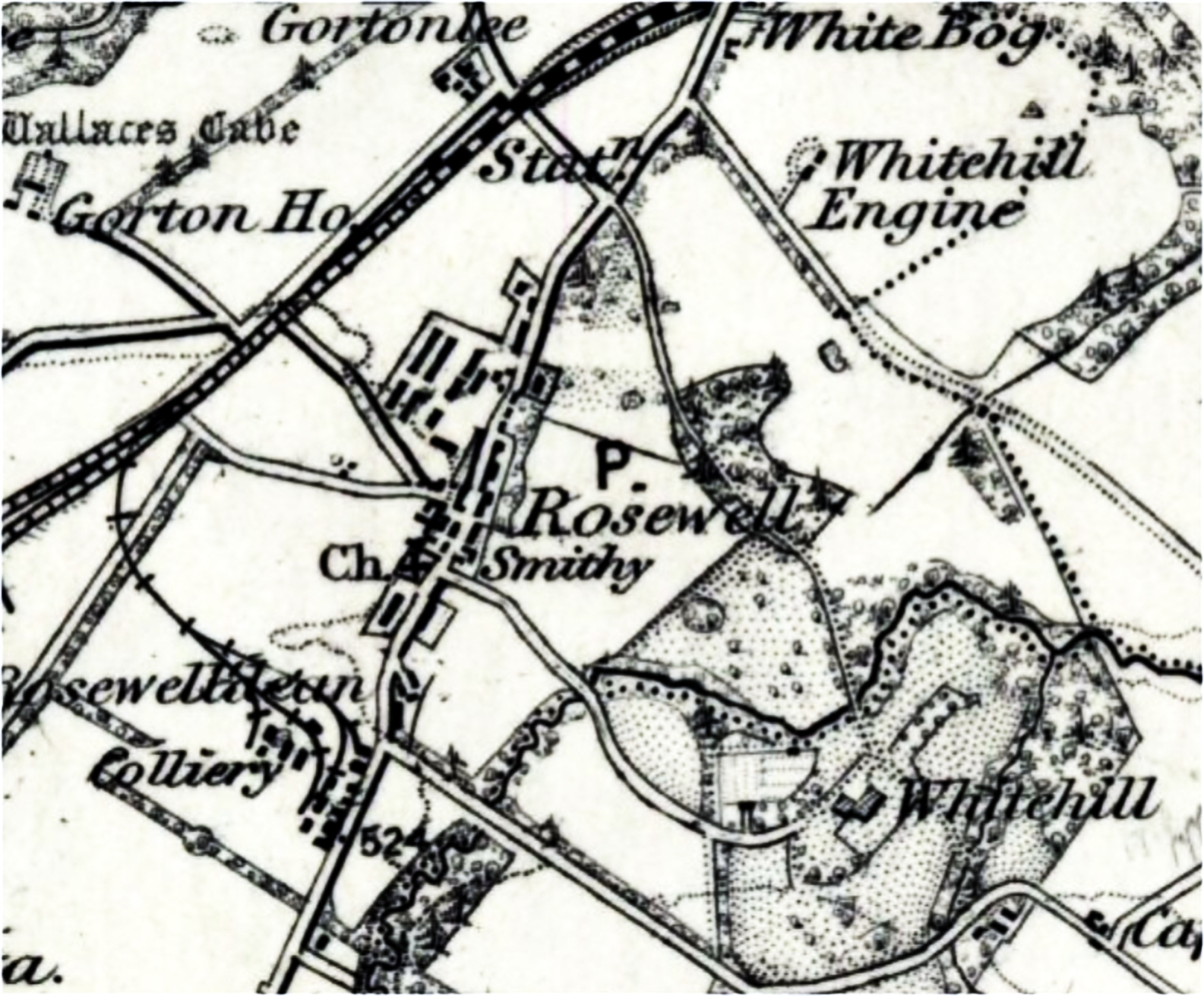
Rosewell, 1898

The colliery village was established by Archibald Hood, mining engineer and entrepreneur, who developed the Whitehill Colliery from 1856, which was located on the south-western edge of the village. He began a new shaft at the colliery in 1878, built railways for the mines (branching from the Peebles Railway) and erected well-designed houses for the miners, and also encouraged the establishment of a Co-operative Retail Society.

In 1890 he amalgamated his company with the mining interests of the Marquess of Lothian to form the Lothian Coal Company. The colliery was named after Whitehill House to the east and was also known as Rosewell. On 1 January 1947 the National Coal Board took over the colliery from the Lothian Coal Company, when mines in Britain were nationalised. The colliery had 3 deep shafts and one surface mine. It reached peak production in 1950, but closed in 1961.

Archibald Hood lived at Rosedale in the south of the village, which is now a category C listed building. This is a mid 19th century two storey gabled house which was later used by the Lothian Coal Company as a house for its managers, in particular his son James Archibald Hood.

The Rosewell Institute, in Carnethie Street, was built for the Lothian Coal Company as a miners' institute in 1917. The institute was built on an impressive scale with finely detailed sandstone features.

Rosewell was served by a railway station lying between Rosewell and Hawthornden. The station opened in 1855 under the name Hawthornden, but was renamed Rosewell and Hawthornden in 1928. It was served by the Peebles Railway, a branch line of the Waverley Line. Services ran from Peebles to Waverley Station in Edinburgh. The station was closed in 1962 but the line remained in use for goods traffic until 1967, although the colliery had already closed by then.

Rosewell Food Market (The Steading Rosewell Farmers Market) was first opened in Rosewell, Midlothian, in May 2025. This marked the launch of the village's first ever regular farmers’ and food market at The Steading

Since then, the market has taken place on the first Sunday of each month, except in January. Occasionally, events may be cancelled due to weather conditions. A warning is issued at least four days in advance.

== Schools ==
Rosewell has two primary schools, namely Rosewell Primary School and St Matthew's (Catholic) Primary School. The village is in the catchment area for Lasswade High School, and St David's Catholic High School.

== Transport ==
Rosewell is served by Lothian Buses. Service 31 runs every 30 minutes (every 40 minutes on Sundays) and serves Bonnyrigg and Edinburgh. The X31 serves Rosewell early mornings (to Edinburgh) and evenings (from Edinburgh).

For walkers and cyclists the Penicuik–Dalkeith Walkway passes close by.

== Churches ==
The village has two churches, Rosewell Parish Church (Church of Scotland) and St Matthew's Roman Catholic Church.

Rosewell Parish Church was built 1871-72 and opened for worship in 1874, when Rosewell became a separate ecclesiastical parish. The population of this new quoad sacra parish was recorded as 1,394 in 1881. In 2008 Rosewell Parish Church was formally re-united with Lasswade Church, forming Lasswade and Rosewell Parish Church (with a single minister and Kirk Session, although retaining both places of worship).

== Whitehill House ==
Situated half a mile south-east of the village, the category A-listed Whitehill House is a large Tudor-Jacobean revival house designed by David Bryce and William Burn, built 1844 as a home for Wardlaw Ramsay, proprietor of the nearby Whitehill Colliery. The house was later acquired by the engineer Archibald Hood. In World War I it was used as a Red Cross hospital. The Scottish nurse, suffragist and writer Flora Masson worked there. Until the late 1990s, Whitehill House was run by nuns of the Daughters of Charity of Saint Vincent de Paul as St. Joseph's Hospital for children with learning disabilities. St. Joseph's also provided care for adults with learning disabilities. It was visited by Pope John Paul II when he visited Scotland in 1982. Since the hospital closed, the charity St Joseph's Services continues to support people with learning disabilities in houses across Midlothian. They have their headquarters in Carnethie Street, Rosewell. Whitehill House is now privately owned and has a 20-hole (18 holes plus 2 bonus holes) golf course in its grounds. A number of exclusive houses have also been built in the grounds.

== Football ==
Whitehill Welfare play their home matches at Ferguson Park, Rosewell. They currently play in the East of Scotland First Division. Heart of Midlothian B played their Lowland League matches at Ferguson Park for the 2022–23 season.

Born in Rosewell, Tom Wilson played for Whitehill in the 1950s before joining Falkirk and then having a successful career in English professional football.

== Sources ==
General Reference

- Scotland National Tourist Board entry

Citations
