= John St Clair, 17th Baron of Roslin =

Scottisn nobleman and 17th Baron of Roslin

William St Clair
- Baron of Roslin
- Baron of Roslin coat of arms
- Predecessor: William St Clair, 16th Baron of Roslin
- Successor: James St Clair, 18th Baron of Roslin
- Died: 1690
- Noble family: Clan Sinclair
- Father: William St Clair
- Mother: Dame Anna Spotswood

John St Clair (died 1690) was a Scottish nobleman and the 17th Baron of Roslin.

== Early life ==
He was the second son of William St Clair, 16th Baron of Roslin and his wife Dame Anna Spotswood, daughter of John Spottiswoode who was the Archbishop of Glasgow and later the Archbishop of St Andrews and Chancellor of Scotland. His elder brother, William, had predeceased their father and so John succeeded to the estates of Roslin.

== Baron of Roslin ==
His estate being overburdened was passed to Sir John Saintclair of Herdamnston who in 1663, with the consent of his son John disposed of the lands of Cattune to John, Lord Borthwick. In November, 1666, John St Clair of Roslin raised letters of law against Herdmanston, inhibited him in 1667 and in 1668 received back the lands of Roslin from Robert Sinclair of Longformacus who had acquired Herdmanston's interest for 10,000 merks.

During the Civil War, John St Clair, 17th Baron of Roslin defended Roslin Castle against Oliver Cromwell's commander General Monk who had with him 600 soldiers and artillery, after the Battle of Dunbar. He only surrendered the castle after one side of it had been battered down by Monk's superior force. He was sent as a prisoner to Tynemouth Castle.

== Death ==
John St Clair, 17th Baron of Roslin died in 1690 and was succeeded by his brother, James St Clair, 18th Baron of Roslin.

== See also ==
- Lord Sinclair
- Earl of Caithness
- Lord Herdmanston
