= Barony of Roslin =

Sinclair, Baron of Roslin coat of arms

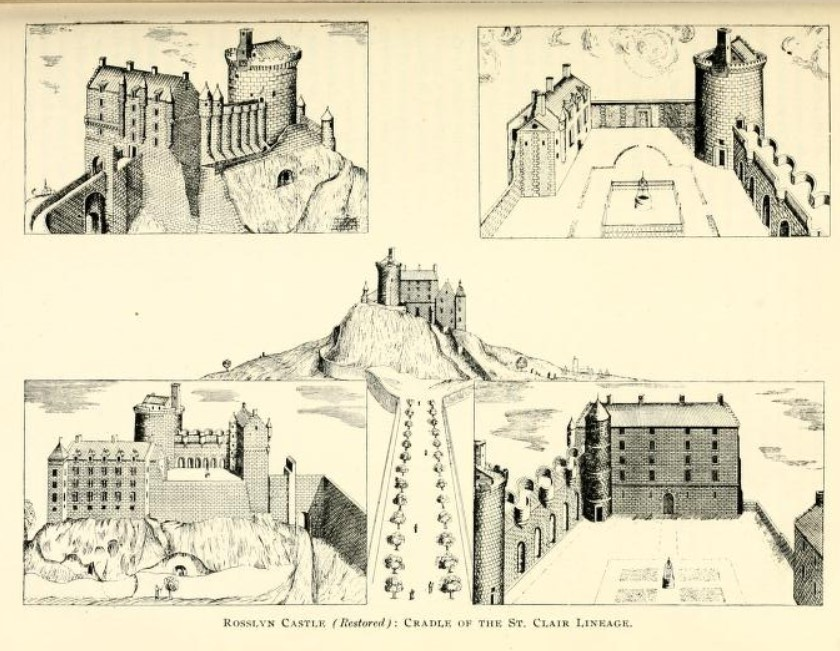
Rosslyn or Roslin Castle, seat of the Sinclairs who were Barons of Roslin, reconstruction image

Baron of Roslin or Rosslyn was a Scottish feudal barony held by the St Clair or Sinclair family.

== History ==
No certain record exists but it is likely that the Sinclairs came from Saint-Clair-sur-Epte in Normandy. According to traditional history, William of Saint-Claire accompanied Saint Margaret of Scotland, daughter of Edward the Exile to Scotland in 1068, where she eventually married Malcolm III of Scotland. In return for his efforts, the king supposedly granted Sinclair the barony of Roslin "in free heritage". However, according to late 19th-century historian Roland Saint-Clair, it is not known if the people who held the estate of Roslin before William St. Clair (died 1297), who is by tradition the 6th Baron, were actually of the same surname, and that he arrived in Scotland from Normandy in the 13th century. William Sinclair (died 1480) who was the 11th Baron of Roslin was also the 3rd Earl of Orkney, 1st Earl of Caithness and 2nd Lord Sinclair. He divided his estates: his eldest son from his first marriage, William, inherited the title of Lord Sinclair, while he left the Barony of Roslin to his eldest son from his second marriage, Oliver, and the earldom of Caithness to his second son from his second marriage, another William, from whom descend the chiefs of the Clan Sinclair. The family of Roslin or Rosslyn prefer the spelling "St Clair" whilst the family of Caithness prefer the spelling "Sinclair".

Although the Rosslyn Chapel tourist website refers to the early Barons by the spelling of Rosslyn, most historic sources refer to them by the spelling of Roslin which is also used for the castle. The later Earls consistently appear with spelling of Rosslyn in accordance with the name of the chapel. The Rosslyn Chapel tourist website also refers to several of the early Barons as Princes of Orkney, whereas most of the historic sources refer to them as Earls of Orkney.

It is not known if the Sinclairs or St Clairs of Roslin share a common origin with the Sinclairs or St Clairs who held the title of Lord Herdmanston. Herdmanston in East Lothian had been held from the 12th century, when Henry St Clair received a grant of the lands of Herdmanston, from Richard de Morville, Constable of Scotland. According to the website sinclairgenealogy.info, the fact that the first proven Baron of Roslin, William St. Clair (died 1297) was made sheriff of Haddington in East Lothian where Herdmanston also is, suggests that he was appointed there to cover his own home area, and given that the name William appears frequently in the St Clair of Herdmanston family suggests that he may have been part of their extended family. However, according to the website clansinclairusa.org, William St Clair of Roslin was probably unrelated to the St Clairs of Herdmanston. According to Archibald Allan writing in 1900, Henry St Clair of Herdmanston appears to have been a son of the first William de St Clair of Roslin of the 11th century, but this William's existence cannot be proved by contemporary evidence and according to Roland Saint-Clair, William St. Clair who died in 1297 was the first proven Baron of Roslin.

== Barons of Roslin ==
=== Barons in traditional history ===
- William "The Seemly" St Clair, 1st Baron of Roslin
- Henry St Clair, 2nd Baron of Roslin (knighted by King Malcolm)
- Henry St Clair, 3rd Baron of Roslin (knighted by David I of Scotland)
- William St Clair, 4th Baron of Roslin (succeeded c.1214 and died 1243)
- Henry St Clair, 5th Baron of Roslin (succeeded 1243 and died c.1270; assisted Alexander III of Scotland in capturing the Western Isles)

=== Barons recorded by contemporary evidence ===
- William St. Clair, 6th Baron of Roslin (succeeded c.1270 and died 1297)
- Henry St Clair, 7th Baron of Roslin (succeeded in 1297 and died in 1331)
- William St Clair, 8th Baron of Roslin (succeeded in 1331 and died in 1358)
- Henry St Clair, 9th Baron of Roslin, 1st Earl of Orkney (succeeded in 1358 and died in 1400)
- Henry St Clair, 10th Baron of Roslin, 2nd Earl of Orkney and 1st Lord Sinclair (succeeded in 1400 and died in 1420)
- William Sinclair, 11th Baron of Roslin, 3rd Earl of Orkney, 2nd Lord Sinclair and 1st Earl of Caithness (succeeded in 1420 and died in 1480. He founded Rosslyn Chapel. He divided his estates: the Barony of Roslin went to his eldest son from his second marriage, Oliver, the earldom of Caithness went to his second son from his second marriage, William, and the eldest son from his first marriage, also called William, became the Lord Sinclair.)
- Oliver St Clair, 12th Baron of Roslin (succeeded in 1484 and died in 1523)
- William St Clair, 13th Baron of Roslin (succeeded in 1523 and died in 1554)
- William St Clair, 14th Baron of Roslin (succeeded c.1554 and died in 1602)
- William St Clair, 15th Baron of Roslin (succeeded in 1602 and died in 1610)
- William St Clair, 16th Baron of Roslin (succeeded c.1610 and died in 1650)
- John St Clair, 17th Baron of Roslin (succeeded in 1650 and died in 1690)
- James St Clair, 18th Baron of Roslin (succeeded in 1690)
- Alexander St Clair, 19th Baron of Roslin (died in 1706)
- William St Clair of Roslin (succeeded in 1707 and died in 1778. All of his sons died young and he was succeeded by his daughter Sarah, who married Peter Wedderburn of Chester Hall. Their son was Alexander Wedderburn St Clair, 1st Earl of Rosslyn.)
