= John Campbell of Lundy =

Scottish lawyer and courtier

John Campbell of Lundy or Lundie (died 1562) was a Scottish lawyer and courtier.

== Biography ==
John Campbell was a son of Thomas Campbell of Lundy, a son of Colin Campbell, 1st Earl of Argyll and Isabella Stewart, who was a daughter of John Stewart, Lord Lorne. The lands of Lundie are in Angus.

He was a founder member of the Scottish College of Justice, and treasurer for James V. In July 1543, he signed the "Secret Bond", a protest against the policies of Regent Arran which led to Mary, Queen of Scots moving from Linlithgow Palace to Stirling Castle. He was Master of Household to Mary of Guise in 1546, when she lived at Stirling Castle with her daughter, Mary, Queen of Scots. Guise also stayed at Falkland Palace in this period in October 1546.

Campbell was Justice Depute in 1546 and held an "ayre" in Lanark. He went with Regent Arran and the Justice Clerk, John Bellenden of Auchnoule, to hold a justiciary court in Aberdeen in June and July 1552. They were entertained by the court musicians and a fool called Robertson, and Arran's cook Robert Bennet prepared their food.

Campbell was involved in a discussion with the officials and representatives of the burgh of Edinburgh in June 1554 about modifications to the dyke built around Arthur's Seat.

He died in 1562.

== Marriages and children ==
He married Isabel Gray, a daughter of Andrew, 2nd Lord Gray, and widow of James Scrimgeour of Dudhope and of Adam Crichton of Brunstane. His second wife was Agnes Home, widow of William Sinclair of Roslin.

His children included:

- John Campbell of Lundy, who married Janet Herring, sister of Andrew Herring of Glascune
- Margaret Campbell
