= Henry St Clair, 7th Baron of Roslin =

Scottish noble

Henry St. Clair
- Baron of Roslin
- Sinclair, Baron of Roslin coat of arms
- Predecessor: William St. Clair, 6th Baron of Roslin
- Successor: William St Clair, 8th Baron of Roslin
- Died: c. 1335
- Noble family: Clan Sinclair
- Spouse: Alice de Fenton
- Father: William St. Clair, 6th Baron of Roslin
- Mother: Agnes Dunbar (maybe)

Sir Henry St Clair was a 13th- and 14th-century Scottish noble, who was the 7th Baron of Roslin and Lord of Catcune.

== Biography ==
Henry was the son of William St. Clair and wife, maybe Agnes Dunbar. He fought at the Battle of Dunbar on 27 April 1296, where he and his father William were captured and he became a prisoner of King Edward I of England at St Briavels Castle. Henry was later exchanged for William FitzWarin in a prisoner exchange.

St Clair was the Sheriff of Lanark in 1305. Fought with his two sons John and William at the Battle of Bannockburn on 23–24 June 1314. King Robert I of Scotland rewarded him for his bravery with the gift of Pentland, the forest of Pentland Moor, Morton and Mortonhall. He was one of the Scottish nobles who in 1320 signed the Declaration of Arbroath. He died around 1335.

== Family and issue ==
Henry married Alice de Fenton, daughter of Sir William de Fenton of Baikie and Beaufort and wife Cecilia Bissett, and is known to have had the following issue:

- Sir William (d. 1330), who left a son, Sir William St Clair, 8th Baron of Roslin (d. 1358), who married Isabella (Isobel) of Strathearn, daughter of Malise V, Earl of Strathearn, and his second wife Marjory of Ross; and
- John (d. 1330).

== See also ==
- Lord Sinclair
- Earl of Caithness
- Lord Herdmanston

Peerage of Scotland
Preceded by William St. Clair	Barony of Roslin; 1297–1331	Succeeded by William St Clair
