= William St Clair, 14th Baron of Roslin =

Scottish nobleman

William St Clair
- Baron of Roslin
- Baron of Roslin coat of arms
- Predecessor: William St Clair, 13th Baron of Roslin
- Successor: William St Clair, 15th Baron of Roslin
- Died: 1602
- Noble family: Clan Sinclair
- Father: William St Clair

William St Clair (died 1602) was a Scottish nobleman and the 14th Baron of Roslin.

== Early life ==
He was the son of William St Clair, 13th Baron of Roslin and Alison, daughter of George Home, 4th Lord Home.

== Baron of Roslin ==
In 1554, William St Clair, 14th Baron of Roslin was confirmed to the barony and present were Oliver Sinclair of Pitcairns, Edward Sinclair of Dryden and John Sinclair of Blans.

In 1559, he was appointed Justicary of the Lothians by Mary, Queen of Scots. He supported Queen Mary at the Battle of Langside in 1588 and obtained a remission for this in 1574. On 6 July 1573 he was charged to produce gold buttons belonging to the King's modir, which he denied having received.

On 12 October 1590 there was a Registration of Caution that he would not harm John Cricton of Brunstoun, and on 18 October he entered into caution to this effect. He was denounced as a rebel on 2 August 1591, but caution was found for him by Oliver Sinclair of Ravensneuk and Henry Sinclair of Quhitekirk, and on 10 August 1604 he had to enter into caution not harm Ravensneuke.

St Clair had collected many manuscripts which had been taken out of the monasteries during the Reformation.

== Family ==
According to Alexander Nisbet's a System of Heraldry, William St Clair married Isabel, daughter of Ker of Cessford, but according to Father Richard Augustine Hay's manuscript of 1690, he married Lindeasy, daughter of the Laird of Egle, brother of the Earl of Crawford, by whom he had the following children:

1. Edward St Clair, who married Christian, daughter of George Douglas of Parkhead the Governor of Edinburgh Castle. Edward was childless and so signed the barony of Roslin over to his brother William in 1582.
2. William St Clair, 15th Baron of Roslin.
3. Elspeth St Clair.
4. Isobell St Clair.
5. Helen St Clair.

== See also ==
- Lord Sinclair
- Earl of Caithness
- Lord Herdmanston
