= Bite-about Pele =

Bite-about
- Printonan Hill, Fogo, Scottish Borders Scotland
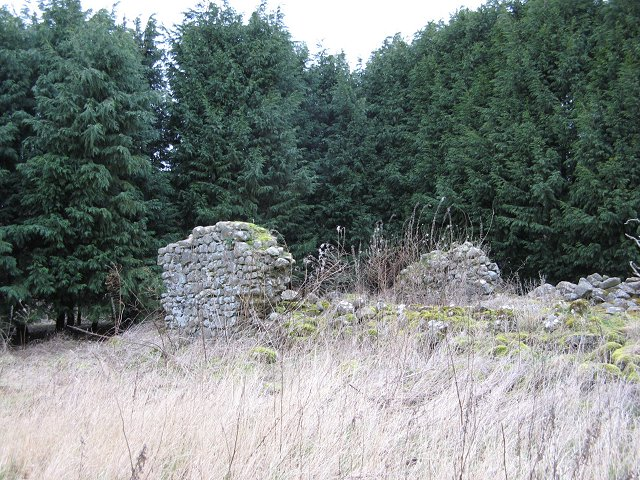
- The remains of Bite-about

Site information
- Type: Pele tower or Bastle house
- Owner: Private
- Open to the public: No
- Condition: ruined

Location
- Location of Bite-about in the Scottish Borders
- Coordinates: 55.7135°N 2.3456°W
- Height: 2m present day

Site history
- Built: 16th century
- Built by: Clan Trotter
- In use: 16th–17th centuries
- Materials: Stone

Bite-about is a very ruined pele tower or bastle house. It is situated in the parish of Eccles, Berwickshire, between the villages of Fogo and Swinton to the south of Duns, Berwickshire, Scotland.

The building dates from the 16th century, and is still a property of the Trotter family. It received its unusual name during a besiegement by the English, whereby the inhabitants shared their rations a bite a time.
