= Mortonhall =

Area of Edinburgh, Scotland

Coordinates: 55°54′12″N 3°10′51″W

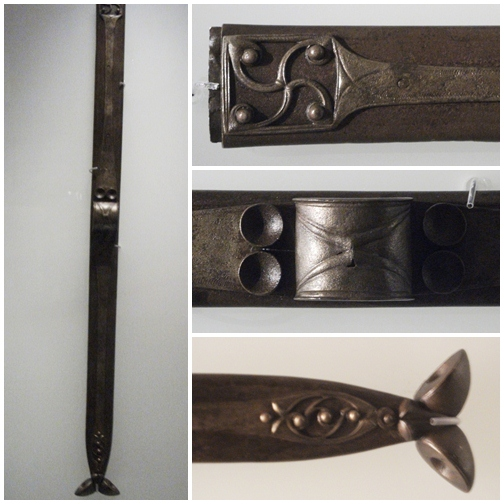
Celtic scabbard found at Mortonhall, 0–200 AD, Museum of Scotland

Mortonhall is an area of Edinburgh, Scotland, on the south edge of the city.

The area is along the western end of the Frogston Road between Fairmilehead and Gilmerton; it is just to the south of Liberton and the Braid Hills.

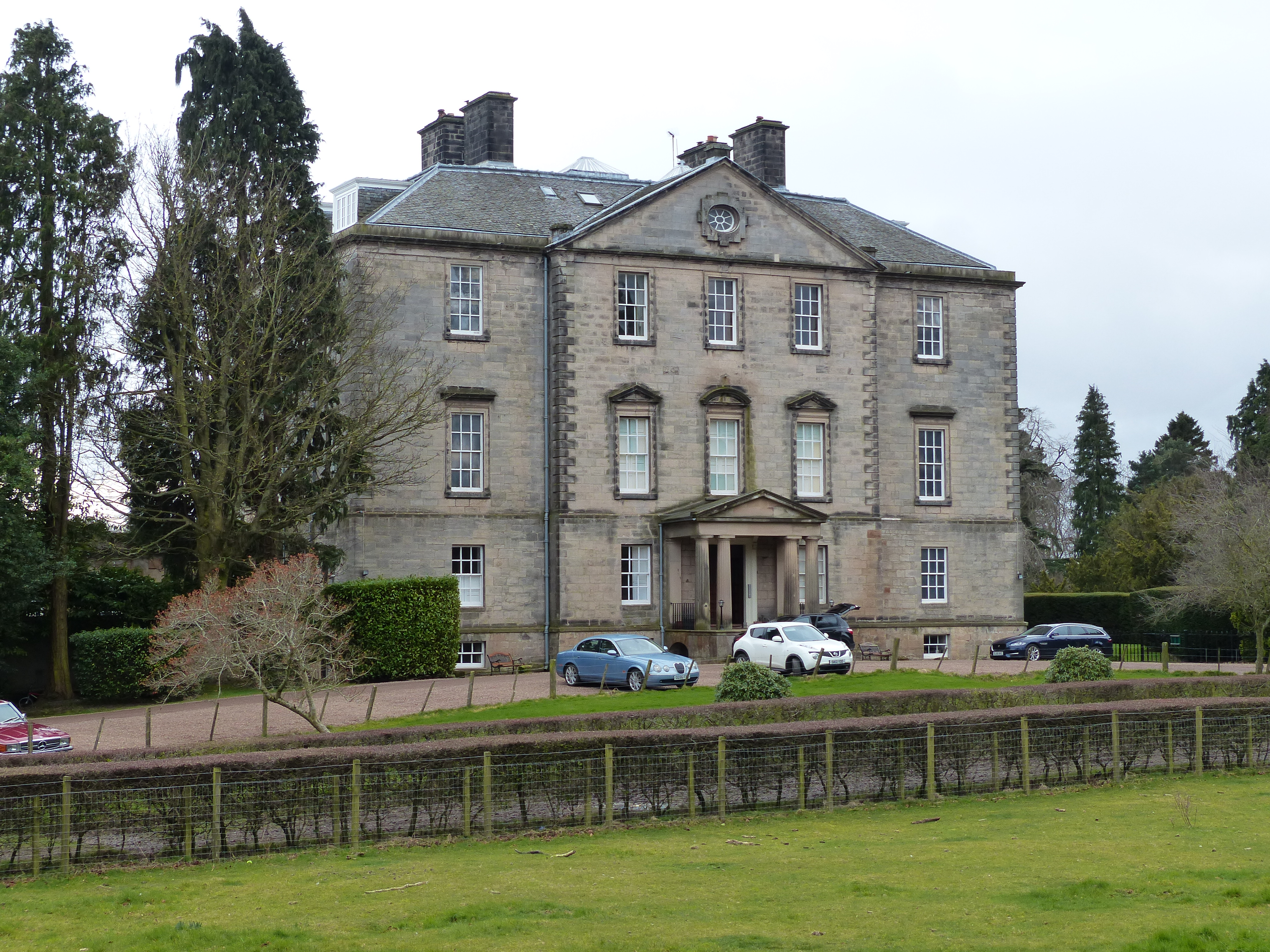
Mortonhall House

The area was the estate of Mortonhall House, a fine country mansion house of 1769, with an exceptional interior. It is thought to be designed by the Edinburgh architect, John Baxter, with interior work added by Thomas Bonnar.

The main house has been converted into offices and flats. The stable range (now a bar) dates from around 1780 and is also particularly fine, including an intact cobbled courtyard. The immediate grounds of the Hall contain a caravan site and a garden centre. To the north, the land has been developed as Mortonhall Golf Club; to the east, there is a 1970s housing estate. The land to the south, on the far side of Frogston Road, is mostly farmland.

Some half a mile to the west, on Frogston Road lies Morton House, the Dower house to Mortonhall. This is smaller and less ornate but still impressive, sitting in a small group of historic properties all originally connected to the estate. Ironically, being built in 1702, it pre-dates the current Mortonhall House. This is because the current main house replaced an earlier house marked on early maps from the 17th century.

The area is perhaps best known for the Mortonhall Crematorium, designed by Sir Basil Spence, which is considered to be an outstanding example of Scottish modern architecture. It is based on the same design as his work at Coventry Cathedral. The crematorium opened in 1967. It has a lush woodland setting, and acts as a local park. The land to the north-west acts as a Garden of Remembrance. The large expanse of open ground to the west acts as a Cemetery, but owing to a policy of all stones having to be laid flat, it has a rather sterile appearance.

== History ==
The Mortonhall scabbard was recovered nearby although its exact findspot is uncertain. This scabbard is from a sword dating to the first century AD, probably from around the time of the first Roman invasion of Scotland.

The land of Morton, Mortonhall, Pentland and part of the Moor of Pentland, was originally granted to Sir Henry St Clair of Rosslyn in 1317 by Robert I. In 1630, Morton came into the ownership of one William Rigg, whose son sold it to the Porterfield family of Comiston; it was later bought back by another son, and in 1789 it was sold to the Trotter family, who had acquired the Mortonhall estate in 1635. They built a modern house on the land, Mortonhall House, in 1769, which was later improved in 1835.
