= William St Clair, 8th Baron of Roslin =

Scottish noble

William St Clair
- Baron of Roslin
- Sinclair, Baron of Roslin coat of arms
- Predecessor: Henry St Clair, 7th Baron of Roslin
- Successor: Henry St Clair, 9th Baron of Roslin
- Died: c. 1379
- Noble family: Clan Sinclair
- Spouse: Isabella (Isobel) of Strathearn
- Father: Sir William St Clair

Sir William St Clair (died circa 1379) was a Scottish noble and by tradition the 8th Baron of Roslin.

== Early life ==
Sir William St Clair was the son of Sir William St Clair and the grandson of Sir Henry St Clair who was traditionally the 7th Baron of Roslin, and wife Alice de Fenton. His father was one of the knights chosen to join James Douglas, Lord of Douglas in his expedition to Palestine with the heart of Robert the Bruce where in an encounter with the Saracens, in the Emirate of Granada, Douglas was killed, along with St Clair. The younger William St Clair therefore succeeded his grandfather.

== Baron of Roslin ==
He was in minority at the time of the death of his father and grandfather and he was recorded in the Exchequer Rolls of Scotland dated 8 August 1348. An annuity of 40 merks that had been granted to his grandfather Henry was confirmed to William St Clair by David II of Scotland at Perth on 17 September 1358. He also received a charter from King David that was dated 11 February 1358 and confirmed in 1363 for the lands of Merton and Merchamyston. In 1358, William St Clair proceeded to Continental Europe to join the crusade against the Prussians. It is recorded by historian Patrick Fraser Tytler that William St Clair along with Sir William Keith the Earl Marischal, Sir Alexander Lindsay, Sir Robert Gifford, and Sir Alexander Montgomery marched through England each with a train of 60 horse and a strong body of foot soldiers heading for the Continent eager for distinction in foreign wars that did not concern them when their own country needed them most. 19th century historian Roland Saint-Clair quotes several charters as evidence to show that William St Clair returned safely from the Continent.

== Family ==
William St Clair married Isabella (Isobel) of Strathearn, second daughter and eventually the sole heiress of Malise V, Earl of Strathearn, Earl of Orkney and Earl of Caithness, and second wife Marjory of Ross. They had a son, Henry I Sinclair, Earl of Orkney, who was in minority when his father died.

== See also ==
- Lord Sinclair
- Earl of Caithness
- Lord Herdmanston

Peerage of Scotland
| Preceded by Henry St Clair | Barony of Roslin; 1331–1358 | Succeeded by Henry Sinclair |
