= William St Clair, 13th Baron of Roslin =

Scottish noble

William St Clair
- Baron of Roslin
- Baron of Roslin coat of arms
- Predecessor: Oliver St Clair, 12th Baron of Roslin
- Successor: William St Clair, 14th Baron of Roslin
- Died: 1554
- Noble family: Clan Sinclair
- Father: Oliver St Clair

William St Clair (died c. 1554) was a Scottish noble and the 13th Baron of Roslin.

== Early life ==
He was the eldest surviving son of Oliver St Clair, 12th Baron of Roslin who died before 1523 when William is found in possession of Roslin. That year William gave some land to the Prebendars of the College of Roslin.

== Baron of Roslin ==
William St Clair, Baron of Roslin was given the right to patronage the Collegiate Chapel of Roslin and Chapel of St. Mathew. In 1533, James V of Scotland gave him a charter renewing some of the older ones that had been granted to his ancestor, Henry I Sinclair, Earl of Orkney. He executed an entail of Roslin and Herbertshire to his sons William, Gilbert, Patrick, Alexander, John, Oliver, Mathew and Edward successively, upon whom failing to his brothers Oliver, Alexander, Arthur and James.

William St Clair, Baron of Roslin received an annual pension of 300 merks from Mary of Guise for his allegiance to the Crown. He was in high favor with James V of Scotland who by his special writ of summons frequently called him to sit in Parliament.

He died before 1554.

== Family ==
William Sinclair, Baron of Roslin married Alison, daughter of George Home, 4th Lord Home and had the following children:

1. William St Clair, 14th Baron of Roslin, heir and successor.
2. Gilbert St Clair.
3. Patrick St Clair.
4. Alexander St Clair, of Cuthilton and Little Denny, who in turn had a son, Hercules who was possibly the reverend iconoclast of Shetland.
5. John St Clair.
6. Oliver St Clair of Westravensneuk.
7. Mathew St Clair.
8. Edward St Clair of Dryden and Ethay in Orkney.

== See also ==
- Lord Sinclair
- Earl of Caithness
- Lord Herdmanston
