= Sheriff of Lanark =

Office in Scotland, dissolved 1975

The Sheriff of Lanark or Sheriff of Lanarkshire was historically the royal official responsible for enforcing law and order and bringing criminals to justice in Lanarkshire, Scotland. Prior to 1748 most sheriffdoms were held on a hereditary basis. From that date, following the Jacobite uprising of 1745, the hereditary sheriffs were replaced by salaried sheriff-deputes, qualified advocates who were members of the Scottish Bar.

The sheriffdom of Lanarkshire was dissolved in 1975 when it was replaced by the current sheriffdom of South Strathclyde, Dumfries and Galloway.

== Sheriffs of Lanarkshire ==
- Baldwin of Biggar (1154)
- Waldeve of Biggar (1170s)
- Hugh, son of Sir Reginald (ca.1196-1200)
- William de Hertisheved (1225)
- Richard de Coulter (1226)
- Alexander Uvieth (Oviot) (1266)
- Nicholas de Biggar (1273-1278)
- Hugh de Dalzell (1288-1290)
- Hugh de Balliol (1290)
- Henry St Clair (1293)
- Godfrey de Ros (1294)
- Andrew Livingstone (1295-1296)
- William Heselrig (England) (1296-1297)(assassinated by William Wallace)
- Walter Logan (1301)
- Walter de Burghdon (1302)
- Robert de Brus (1303)
  - Magnus de Stratherne - 1303 - Deputy
  - Nicholas de Benhathe - 1303 - Deputy
- Henry St Clair (1305)
- William Fleming of Barochan (1306)
- Robert de Barde (1329)
- William Douglas (c. 1345)
- William Livingston (1359)
- Robert Dalzell (1360)
- James Lindsay (1373)
  - Hugh Aldistoun - 1373 - Deputy
- William Newbyggyng (1387)
  - William Somerville - 1387 - Deputy
  - Thomas Fitzmartin - 1387 - Deputy
- James Douglas of Bavany (1432)
- Hugh Douglas, Earl of Ormonde (1454)
- James Hamilton, 1st Lord Hamilton (1470)
- Archibald Douglas, 5th Earl of Angus (1489)
- James Livingstone
- John Speddy (c. 1552)
- William Douglas, Duke of Hamilton (1683)
- Anne Hamilton, 3rd Duchess of Hamilton (1694-1716)
- George Sinclair, Lord Woodhall (1747-1764?)

Sheriffs-Depute (1748)

- Robert Sinclair, 1775–1786
- Sir William Honyman, 1st Baronet, 1786–1797
- Robert Hamilton, 1797–1822
- William Rose Robinson, 1822–1834
- Archibald Alison, 1834–1867
- Henry Glassford Bell, 1867–1874
- William Gillespie Dickson, 1874–1876
- Francis William Clark, 1876–1886
- Robert Berry, 1886–1903
- William Guthrie, 1903–
- Alastair Oswald Morison Mackenzie, 1917-1933
- Sir Archibald Campbell Black, KC, 1937–1952
- Sir Robert Henry Sherwood Calver, QC, 1952–
- Sir Allan Grierson Walker, QC, 1963–74
- Sheriffdom replaced in 1975 by the sheriffdom of South Strathclyde, Dumfries and Galloway.

== See also ==
- Historical development of Scottish sheriffdoms
