= Catcune Castle =

Coordinates: 55.8325°N 3.0378°W

Catcune Castle was a castle around 1 mile (1.6 km) south of Gorebridge, north of the Gore Water, in Midlothian, Scotland.

== History ==
This was originally a property of the Borthwick family; it passed to the Sinclairs, who probably built the castle. The lands of Catcune are mentioned in 1527 and 1652. By 1908 the castle is reported to have been very ruinous; by 1954 reduced to the rock outcrop it was built on; by 1975 there was said to be no trace of it in a pasture field.

== Structure ==
The castle was an L-plan tower house, standing on a rock outcrop.

The main block, which ran north to south, was 44 feet (13 m) by 25 feet (7.6 m). The wing, which projected west in line with the west gable, was 22 feet (6.7 m) by 20 feet (6.1 m). There were three vaulted cellars on the ground floor.
