= Gorton, Midlothian =

Locality in Midlothian, Scotland

Coordinates: 55.854062°N 3.147523°W

Gorton (Note: Also known as Gourton) is a locality, in the parish of Lasswade, in Midlothian, Scotland.

The locality is the location of Old Gorton House, a 17th century dwelling. A series of caves exist nearby and have carvings inside. The caves also appear to have been used during the Wars of Scottish Independence, with one known as Wallace’s Cave.

William St. Clair of Roslin acquired the Knights Templar lands of Gourton from Walter fitz Stephen de Meliville in the 13th century. The Lizar family were lords of Gorton in the 12th century.
