= Alexander St Clair, 19th Baron of Roslin =

19th Baron of Roslin (Scotland)

Alexander St Clair
- Baron of Roslin
- Baron of Roslin coat of arms
- Predecessor: James St Clair, 18th Baron of Roslin
- Successor: William St Clair of Roslin
- Born: 1672
- Died: 1706 (aged 33–34)
- Noble family: Clan Sinclair
- Father: James St Clair
- Mother: Jean Spotswood

Alexander St Clair (1672–1706) was the 19th Baron of Roslin.

== Early life ==
He was the second son of James St Clair, 18th Baron of Roslin and Jean, daughter of Henry Spotswood, Sheriff of Dublin. His elder brother, James St Clair, had been killed fighting at the Battle of the Boyne in 1690 and therefore Alexander succeeded to the estates of Roslin.

== Baron of Roslin ==
Alexander's poems are preserved in manuscript form in the Advocates Library.

== Family ==
Alexander married Jean, daughter of Robert, 7th Lord Sempill. He was succeeded by his son, William St Clair of Roslin, and had two other sons and three daughters who died young. Alexander died in 1706.

== See also ==
- Lord Sinclair
- Earl of Caithness
- Lord Herdmanston

Baronage of Scotland
Preceded by James St Clair	Baron of Roslin unknown-1706	Succeeded by William St Clair
