= Roslin Glen Country Park =

Country park in Midlothian, Scotland

Coordinates: 55°51′11.84″N 3°9′48.46″W

Designations

Inventory of Gardens and Designed Landscapes in Scotland
- Official name: Roslin Glen and Hawthornden Castle
- Designated: 30 March 2001
- Reference no.: GDL00327

Roslin Glen Country Park is a wooded glen in the North Esk Valley, near the village of Roslin in Scotland. It contains walks with several places of interest along the way, including Rosslyn Chapel, Roslin Castle, Wallace's Cave and Hawthornden Castle.
