= William St Clair of Roslin =

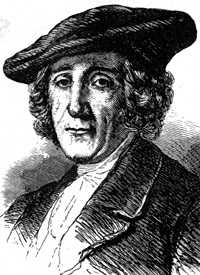
William St Clair of Roslin

William St Clair of Roslin, 20th Baron of Roslin (1700-1778) was a member of the Clan Sinclair. His title, Baron of Roslin, was not a peerage but a noble title of feudal origin in the Baronage of Scotland. He had an interest in sport and was a skilled golfer and archer. He redesigned the Old Course at St. Andrews to 18 holes thus affecting all golf courses since. He was the son of Alexander St Clair, 19th Baron of Roslin.

== Freemasonry ==
He was a Scottish Freemason, being Initiated in Lodge Canongate Kilwinning on 18 May, Passed on 2 June 1736 and Raised on 3 November 1736. He is known as the first Grand Master (although his actual title is Grand Master Mason) of the Grand Lodge of Scotland. He became the first Grand Master Mason by acclamation on St. Andrew's Day of the same year (1736).

== See also ==
- Lord Sinclair
- Earl of Caithness
- Lord Herdmanston

== Sources ==
- "William Saint Clair of Roslin". Grand Lodge of British Columbia and Yukon.
- "Lodge Canongate Kilwinning".

Masonic offices
New title	Grand Master of the Grand Lodge of Scotland; 1736–1737	Succeeded by The Earl of Cromartie
Baronage of Scotland
Preceded by James St Clair	Baron of Roslin; 1707–1778	Succeeded by Sarah Wedderburn
