= Stuart Mitchell =

Scottish musician (1965–2018)

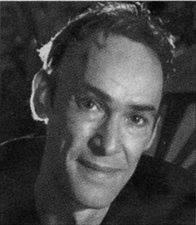

Background information
- Born: 21 December 1965
- Died: August 2018 (aged 52)
- Genres: Classical
- Instrument: Piano
- Years active: 1995–2018

Stuart Mitchell (21 December 1965 – August 2018) was a Scottish pianist and composer who was born in Edinburgh and who is best known for his Seven Wonders Suite (2001). The Seven Wonders Suite has been recorded by The Prague Symphony Orchestra conducted by Mario Klemens. A performance of part of the suite was performed in The Dvorak Hall in Prague in 2005. This major symphonic work has placed Mitchell in The Classic FM Hall of Fame since 2005, and is regularly requested by their listeners.

Stuart Mitchell was the son of pianist and composer Thomas J. Mitchell. In 2005, the Mitchells received media coverage from Reuters, ITN, BBC, and CNN/Fox News when they claimed to have deciphered a musical code carved into the ceiling design of Rosslyn Chapel.

In 2008, Mitchell released the first in his series of works called DNA Variations, music translated from Ancestral DNA sequences of various species and Fly – Orchestral Suite in 2016 was based upon the mitochondrial DNA music of birds and winged beings.

The Seven Wonders Suite was voted 181 in the Classic FM Hall of Fame 2017. In the 2023 chart, the suite had reached a new peak position of 82.

Mitchell died of lung cancer in August 2018, aged 52.

== Works ==
- Cello Sonata in A – 1995
- The Design of a Tear – 1998
- Seven Wonders Suite for Orchestra (2003)
- The Rosslyn Motet (2005)
- Songs of the Chartres Labyrinth (2005)
- DNA Variations Volumes I, II and III (2004–2009)
- Transit of Venus – 2010
- The Celestial Song of the Stars – 2010
- Fanfare to Tutankhamen – 2009
- Piano Concerto No.1 – 2008
- Beethoven's DNA Music – 2010
- The Eve Project (2011)
- The Musical Life of Plants (2011)
- The Emerald Tablets – Orchestral Choral Suite – 2008
- Symphony No1 in B Flat Major – 2012
- The Human Genome Music Project (2012)
- Grounded – Motion Picture Soundtrack (2013)
- Elvis Presley – DNA Music Translation/Rolling Stone Magazine
- String Quartet – E minor – 2013
- Faith Eternal for Choir & Orchestral – 2013
- Power of the Earth – Grounded 2 Motion Picture – 2013
- Symphony in the Key of H - 2013
- Homage to the Great Composers – 2012
- The Musical Life of Plants – Aromamusic – 2012
- The Silent Sky – with Neil Warden – 2015
- Fly – Orchestral Suite (2016)
