= Justiciar of Galloway =

Extinct Scottish legal office

The Justiciar of Galloway was an important legal office in the High Medieval Kingdom of Scotland.

The Justiciars of Galloway were responsible for the administration of royal justice in the province of Galloway. The other Justiciar positions were the Justiciar of Lothian and the Justiciar of Scotia. The institution may date to the reign of King William of Scotland (died 1214).

== List of Justiciars of Galloway, (incomplete) ==
- Lochlann of Galloway (d.1200)
- John I Comyn, Lord of Badenoch (1258)
- Stephen Fleming (1263–1264)
- Aymer Maxwell (1264)
- William St. Clair (1288)
- Roger Skoter (1296) (England)
- John de Botetourt (1303) (England)
- Roger de Kirkpatrick (Scotland) and Walter de Burghdon (England) (1305)
- John Gordon of Lochinvar (-1586)
