= Walter de Burghdon =

Arms of Walter de Burghdon: Argent, three cinquefoils sable.

Sir Walter de Burghdon, also known as Walter de Burdon, acted as the Constable of Carstairs Castle, the Sheriff of Lanark during 1301-1303 and joint Justiciar of Galloway in 1305.

== Biography ==
Walter was appointed keeper of Carstairs Castle in 1301 what is now South Lanarkshire, Scotland, which he held as his administrative centre as Sheriff of Lanark during the English administration of Scotland. He was replaced by Robert, Earl of Carrick in 1303. He was later appointed as joint Justiciar of Galloway with Roger de Kirkpatrick in 1305. He is recorded as having died in 1309.
