= William St Clair, 16th Baron of Roslin =

Scottish nobleman

William St Clair
- Baron of Roslin
- Baron of Roslin coat of arms
- Predecessor: William St Clair, 15th Baron of Roslin
- Successor: John St Clair, 17th Baron of Roslin
- Died: 1650
- Noble family: Clan Sinclair
- Father: William St Clair
- Mother: Jean or Janet Edmondstone

William St Clair (died 1650) was a Scottish nobleman and the 16th Baron of Roslin.

== Early life ==
He was the son of William St Clair, 15th Baron of Roslin and his wife Jean or Janet Edmondstone, daughter of the Laird Of that Ilk. He succeeded to the estates of Roslin upon the death of his father in 1610.

== Baron of Roslin ==
William St Clair, 16th Baron of Roslin received a charter of the Hereditary Protectorate from the Scottish Freemasons in 1630. He objected to the appointment of Anthonie Alexander to be the Master of Work to the Crown of Scotland as being in prejudice to his hereditary charge of the Masons of the Kingdom.

He added to his family's ancestral halls at Roslin Castle and built a structure over the vaults. He was a loyalist and supported the cause of Charles I of England.

== Death ==
He died during the Civil War and was interred in Rosslyn Chapel on the same day that the Battle of Dunbar was fought on 3 September 1650.

His tomb was excavated at the start of the 18th century and the findings recorded by a Father Hay and kept at the Advocates Library in Edinburgh. This states the body was buried in full armour wearing a red velvet cap and resting on a stone slab, with no coffin, as were his ancestors.

== Family ==
Wiliam St Clair, 16th Baron of Roslin married, in 1609, to Dame Anna Spotswood, daughter of John Spottiswoode who was then the Archbishop of Glasgow and later the Archbishop of St Andrews and Chancellor of Scotland. They had the following children:

1. William St Clair, who died in France, predeceasing his father, leaving two natural daughters; Margaret (by a niece of Scougall of Whitekirk) who married James Carruthers, tutor of Annandale, and Elizabeth who was unmarried.
2. John St Clair, 17th Baron of Roslin, heir and successor.
3. James St Clair, 18th Baron of Roslin, who succeeded his elder brother.
4. Lewis St Clair, Captain of Horse in General Duncan's Regiment and was killed at the Siege of Hallingsted.
5. Henry St Clair.
6. Patrick St Clair.
7. Charles St Clair.
8. Robert St Clair.
9. George St Clair, died young.
10. Archibald St Clair, died unmarried.
11. Rachel St Clair, who married to Hume, the Laird of Foord.
12. Rachel St Clair, died unmarried.
13. Margaret St Clair, died young.
14. Helen St Clair, who married firstly to John Rollo of Bannockburn, secondly to Stirling of Herbertshire, and thirdly to Colin Mckenzie, brother of the Earl of Seaforth.

== See also ==
- Lord Sinclair
- Earl of Caithness
- Lord Herdmanston
