= Chateau de Saint-Clair =

Castle in Val-d'Oise, France

Coordinates: 49.207°N 1.6774°E

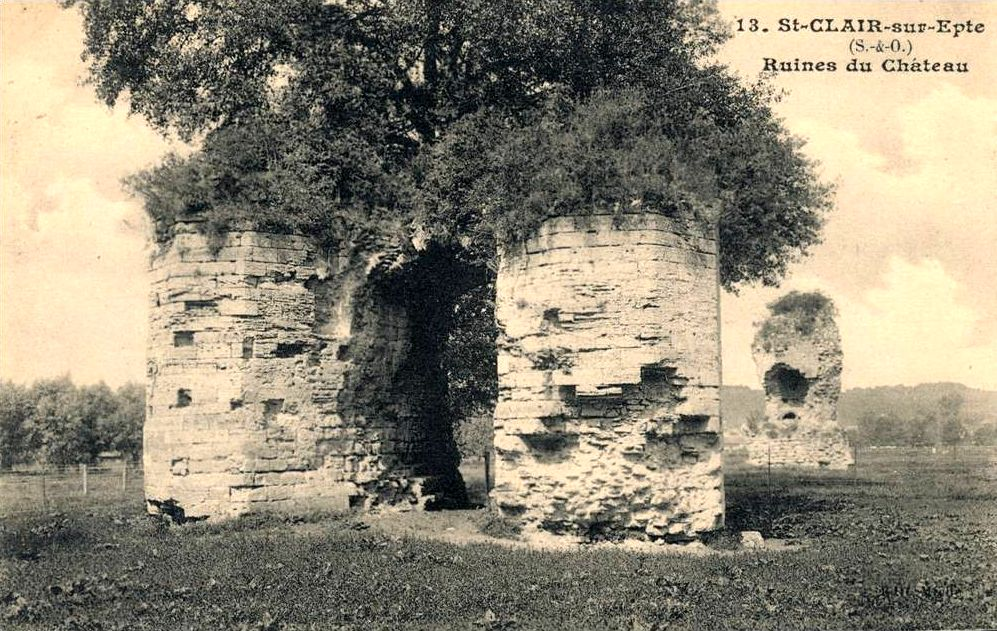
Ruins of Château de Saint-Clair

Château de Saint-Clair was a castle in Saint-Clair-sur-Epte, Val-d'Oise, France.

== History ==
The remains of an ancient castle dating from the 10th century exist to the west of the town.

During 1118, Henry I of England seized the castle of Saint-Clair.
