= James St Clair, 18th Baron of Roslin =

Scottish nobleman

William St Clair
- Baron of Roslin
- Baron of Roslin coat of arms
- Predecessor: John St Clair, 17th Baron of Roslin
- Successor: Alexander St Clair, 19th Baron of Roslin
- Noble family: Clan Sinclair
- Father: William St Clair, 16th Baron of Roslin
- Mother: Dame Anna Spotswood

James St Clair was a Scottish nobleman and the 18th Baron of Roslin.

== Early life ==
He was the third son of William St Clair, 16th Baron of Roslin and Dame Anna Spotswood, daughter of John Spottiswoode who was the Archbishop of Glasgow and later the Archbishop of St Andrews and Chancellor of Scotland. His elder brother was John St Clair, 17th Baron of Roslin who died in 1690 and whom he succeeded.

== Baron of Roslin ==
He redeemed the estate of Roslin and was an apprentice in London after which he went to France where he spent time with Mr Monteith who was the author of The Troubles of Great Britain, then settled with the Knight of Malta, Great Prieur of France. He later entered into service with the Archbishop of Corinth to who he dedicated his book Troubles of Brittany. He later served Lord Rutherford the Viscount Teviot as his secretary in Dunkirk and at Tangier in Africa. He was later Commissar of Shetland.

He did not re-build Roslin Castle after it had been destroyed by Oliver Cromwell's troops under General Monk during the time of his elder brother, John St Clair, 17th Baron of Roslin.

== Family ==
James St Clair, 18th Baron of Roslin married to Jean, daughter of Henry Spotswood the Sheriff of Dublin. They had the following children:

1. James St Clair, who was killed fighting at the Battle of the Boyne in Ireland in 1690, fighting for King James.
2. Alexander St Clair, 19th Baron of Roslin, born 1672, heir and successor.
3. Thomas St Clair, born 1676, married Elizabeth, daughter of Captain Wachope leaving two sons and one daughter.
4. Helen St Clair, born 1670, who married Henry Kerr of Gredane.
5. Anna St Clair, born 1674, died aged nine.

== See also ==
- Lord Sinclair
- Earl of Caithness
- Lord Herdmanston
