= Clan Trotter =

Scottish clan

- Motto: In Promptu (In readiness)

Chief
- Alexander Trotter of Mortonhall
- Chief of Clan Trotter
- Seat: Mortonhall
Clan branches
Trotter of Mortonhall (chiefs)
Trotter of Prentannan (historic chiefs)
Trotter of Charterhall
Trotter of Catchelraw
Allied clans
Clan Home

Clan Trotter is a Scottish clan of the Scottish Borders.

== History ==
=== Origins of the clan ===
The name Trotter is believed to be derived from the French word trotier which means runner or messenger. There is a tradition that a brother of Lord Gifford was given the name for delivering a message with great speed to James III of Scotland.

The chiefs of the clan in the Scottish Borders were the Trotters of Prentannan in Berwickshire. They followed the Clan Home on many of their forays across the border. A junior branch of the clan, the Trotters of Mortonhall claim to have held their lands as far back as the reign of Robert II of Scotland.

=== 15th and 16th centuries ===
Another junior branch of the clan were the Trotters of Catchelraw. William Trotter of Catchelraw was a knight charged with keeping the peace on the Borders under royal warrants of 1437 and 1450. A grandson of his was treasurer of the city of Edinburgh.

A chief of the Clan Trotter was killed at the Battle of Flodden in 1513.

=== 17th century and civil war ===
The Trotters of Catchelraw were staunch supporters of Charles I of England and were fined for assisting James Graham, 1st Marquess of Montrose in 1645.

A direct descendant of the Trotter killed at Flodden fought for John Graham, 1st Viscount Dundee at the Battle of Killiecrankie in 1689. His grandson was the Reverend Robert Trotter who was a distinguished academic who produced a work on the life of Christ and the Apostles. The work is still considered standard reading in many theology colleges. Dr John Trotter continued the family's Jacobite sympathies and treated wounded Scots soldiers returning from England.

=== 19th century ===
Robert Trotter of Bush who died in 1807 was Postmaster General for Scotland. In 1815 Thomas Trotter of Mortonhall was killed at the Battle of Waterloo serving with his squadron of Dragoons.

== Clan chief ==
Alexander Richard Trotter of Mortonhall, and 5th of Charterhall, and chief of the Name and Arms of Trotter, JP, DL.

== Clan profile ==
- Arms: Quarterly, 1st & 4th, Argent, a fess Gules between three mullets in chief Sable and a crescent in base Azure; 2nd & 3rd, Argent, a chevron between three boars' heads couped Sable.
- Crest: A knight in armour Proper, holding his courser Argent caparisoned Gules.
- Motto: In promptu (In readiness).
- Supporters: Dexter, a lion rampant Gules, armed and langued Azure; sinister, a horse Argent maned and hoofed Or.

== See also ==
- Scottish clan
- Armigerous clan
