= Old Pentland =

Locality in Midlothian, Scotland

Coordinates: 55°52′58″N 3°10′39″W

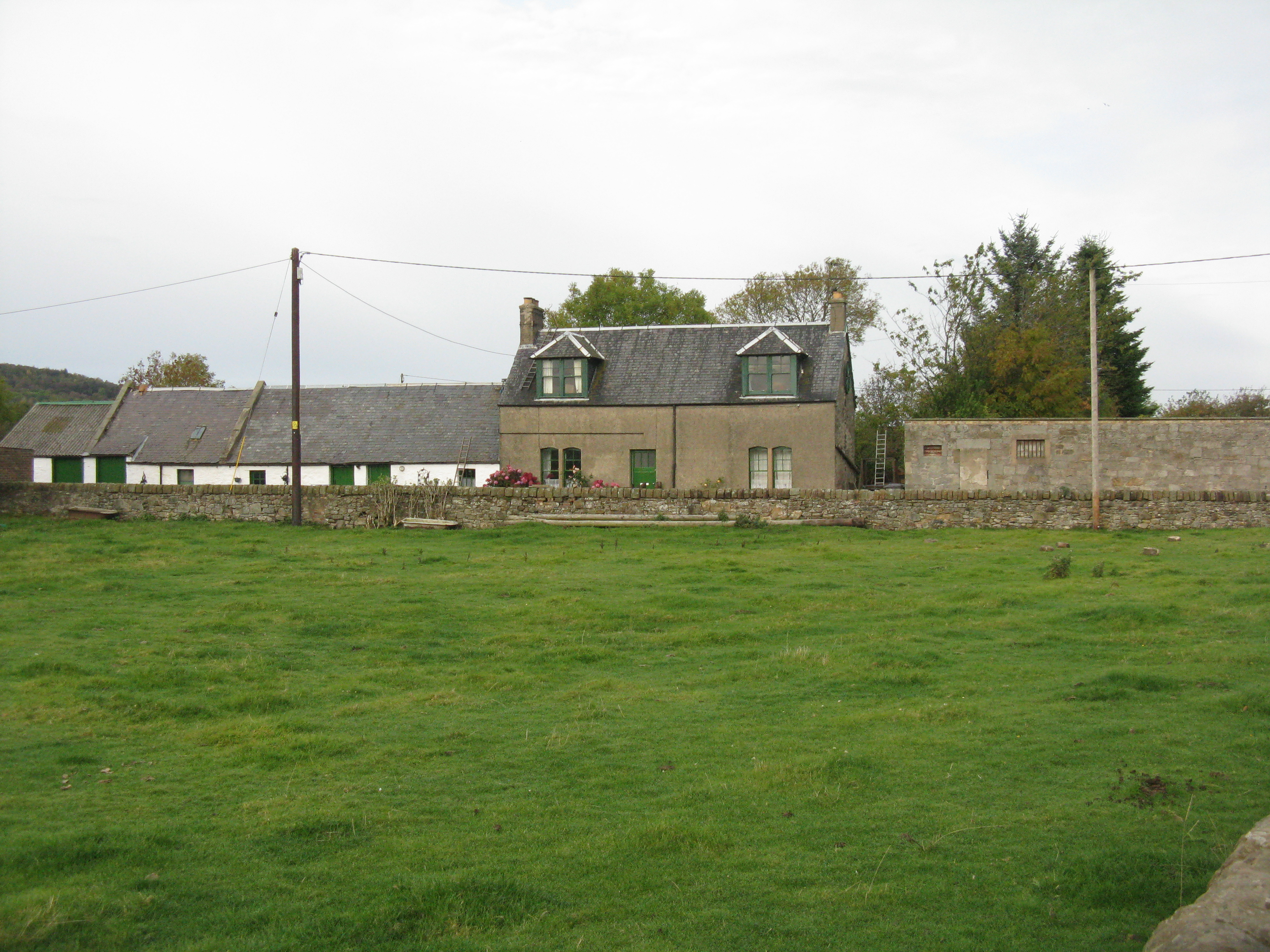
Cottages at Old Pentland

Old Pentland (Note: Previously known as Pentland, before New Pentland was built) is a locality, former parish and former barony in Midlothian, Scotland.

== History ==
The Pentland family were dispossessed of their lands during the Wars of Scottish Independence.

King Robert I of Scotland rewarded Henry St Clair for his bravery with the gift of Pentland, the forest of Pentland Moor, Morton and Mortonhall.

== Parish ==
Erected into a parish before 1275, the parish of Pentland comprised the baronies of Pentland and Falford (or Fulford). The parish was suppressed in 1647, and the northern part annexed to the parish of Lasswade, while the southern, comprising the barony of Falford, was united to the new parish of St. Catherine's, now called Glencorse. The churchyard of Pentland was still in use until at least 1907.
