= Hugues IV de Châteauneuf =

13th century French noble

Hugues IV de Châteauneuf (1185 – 1230), Lord of Châteauneuf and Sorel, was a 13th-century French noble.

== Life ==
Hugues de Châteauneuf was the eldest son of Gervais II de Châteauneuf and wife Marguerite de Donzy. He accompanied King Philippe II of France with his father to the castles of Loches and Chinon in 1205. In 1212 he married Éléonore de Dreux, daughter of Robert II of Dreux, Count of Dreux, and second wife Yolande de Coucy. His wife Éléonore remarried to Robert de Saint-Clair.

He is known to have had the following children:

- Jean de Châteauneuf (d. 1253), Lord of Châteauneuf and Sorel, died with issue; he was succeeded by his stepfather
- Eléonore de Châteauneuf, married Richard I de La Roche
- Marguerite de Châteauneuf, married Hervé III, Lord of Léon
- Yolande de Châteauneuf, married Geoffroi de La Roche
- Agnès de Châteauneuf, a nun
- Luce de Châteauneuf, a nun
