= River Esk, Lothian =

River in Midlothian and East Lothian, Scotland

River Esk
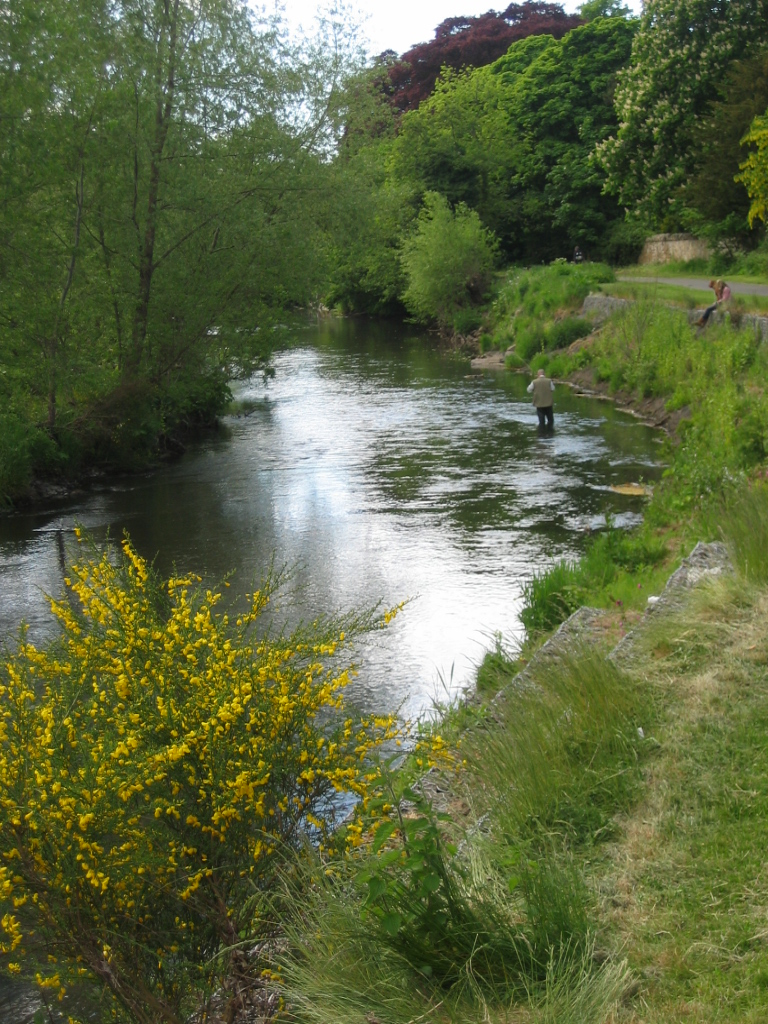

- Location within Scotland

Location
- Country: Scotland
- Region: Midlothian, East Lothian

Physical characteristics
- Mouth: Firth of Forth
  - coordinates: 55.94453°N 3.05137°W

The River Esk (Brythonic: Isca (water), Scottish Gaelic: Easg (water)), also called the Lothian Esk, is a river that flows through Midlothian and East Lothian, Scotland.

It initially runs as two separate rivers: the North Esk and the South Esk.

== Route ==
The North Esk rises in the North Esk Reservoir in the Pentland Hills, in Midlothian, a mile (1.6 km) north of the village of Carlops. It flows north-east past Penicuik and Auchendinny, where it is joined by the Glencorse Burn, flowing in a south-easterly direction from the Glencorse Reservoir. The reservoir was built by the Edinburgh Water Company in the 1820s, to supply compensation water to millowners on the Esk when they started to take water from the Glencorse Burn for drinking water supplies. The river continues through Roslin Glen and the Penicuik–Dalkeith Walkway, past Hawthornden Castle, Polton, Lasswade and Melville Castle.

The South Esk rises at the southernmost extremity of Midlothian, on the western slopes of Blackhope Scar (the highest of the Moorfoot Hills). It flows north through Gladhouse Reservoir and Rosebery Reservoir, and by the village of Temple, before receiving the Redside Burn close to Arniston House. It is joined by the Gore Water at Shank. The Dalhousie Burn joins just to the west of Newtongrange. The South Esk passes Newbattle Abbey and proceeds through Dalkeith.

The rivers converge just about 1.25 miles (2.01 km) north-east of Dalkeith at the edge of the grounds of Dalkeith Palace. From here the River Esk continues north for about 4.3 miles (6.9 km), entering the East Lothian region, skirting Inveresk and flowing into the Firth of Forth at Fisherrow (Musselburgh).

== Photo gallery ==
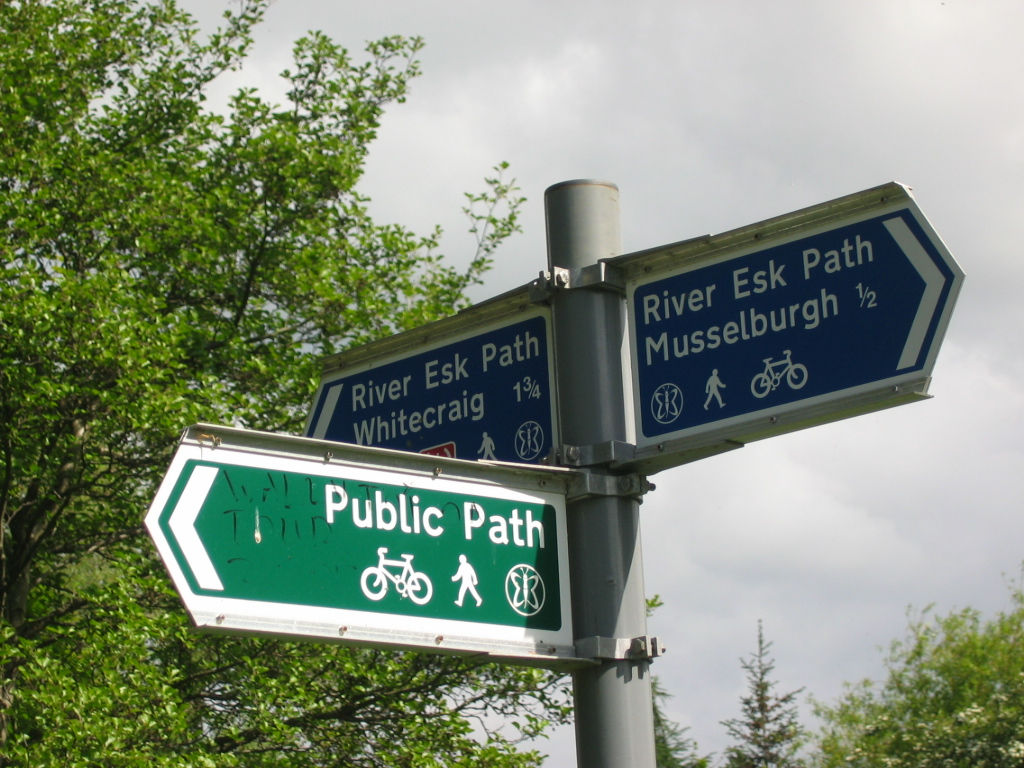
River Esk signpost

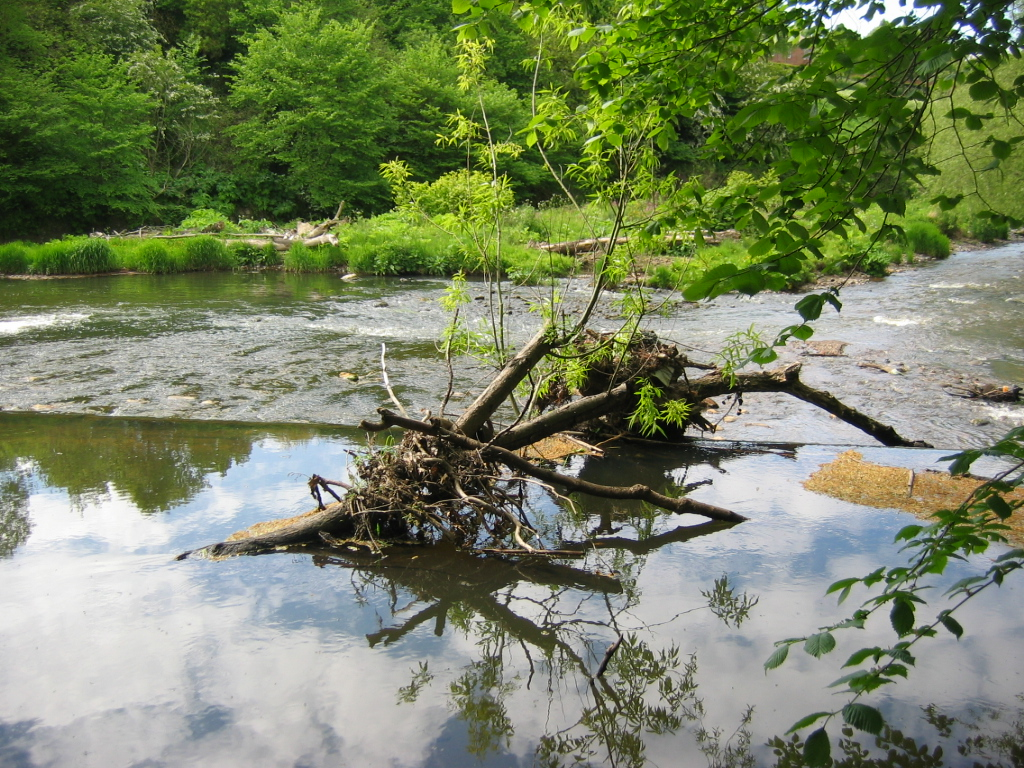
River Esk weir

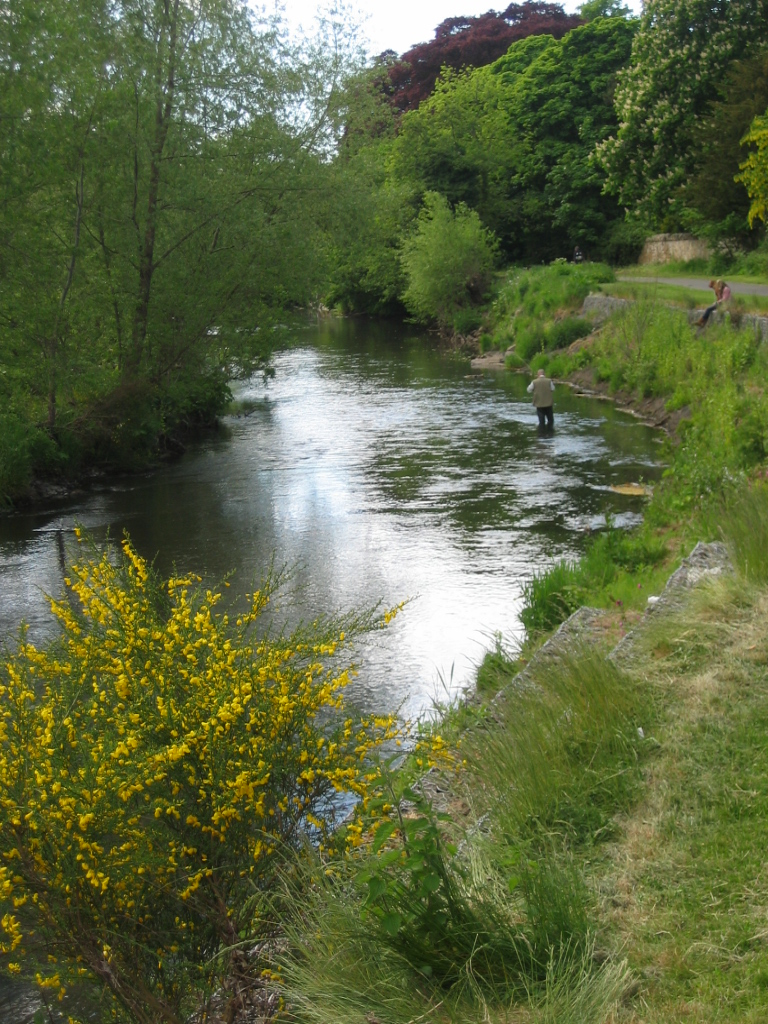
River Esk angler

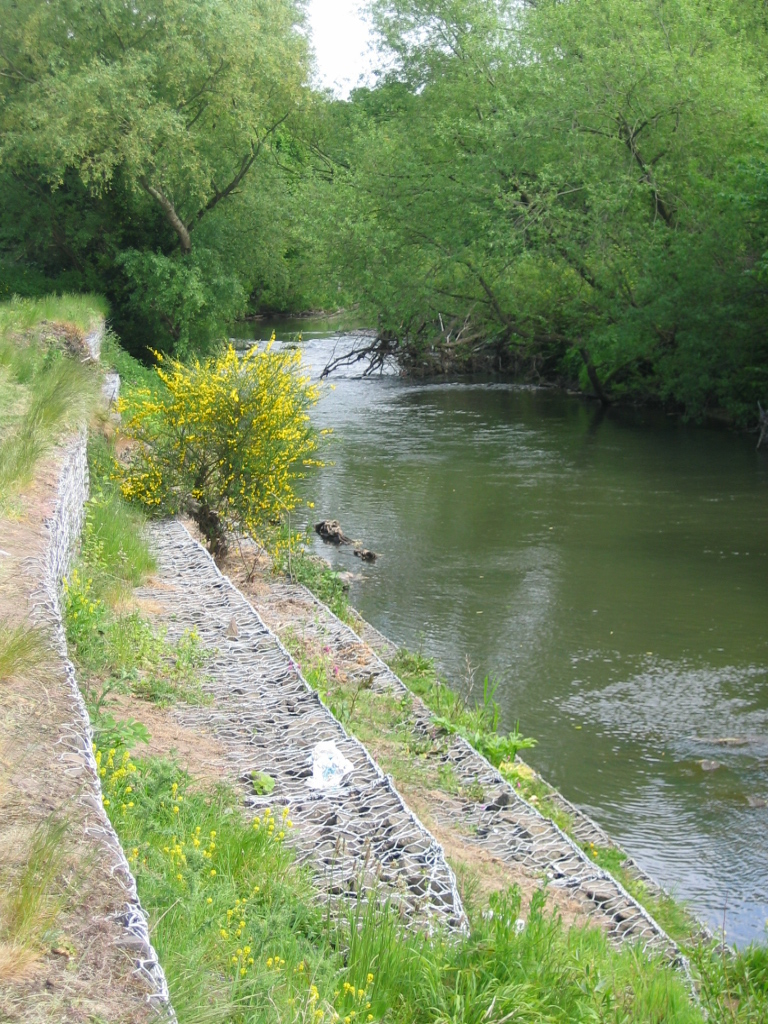
River Esk bank erosion

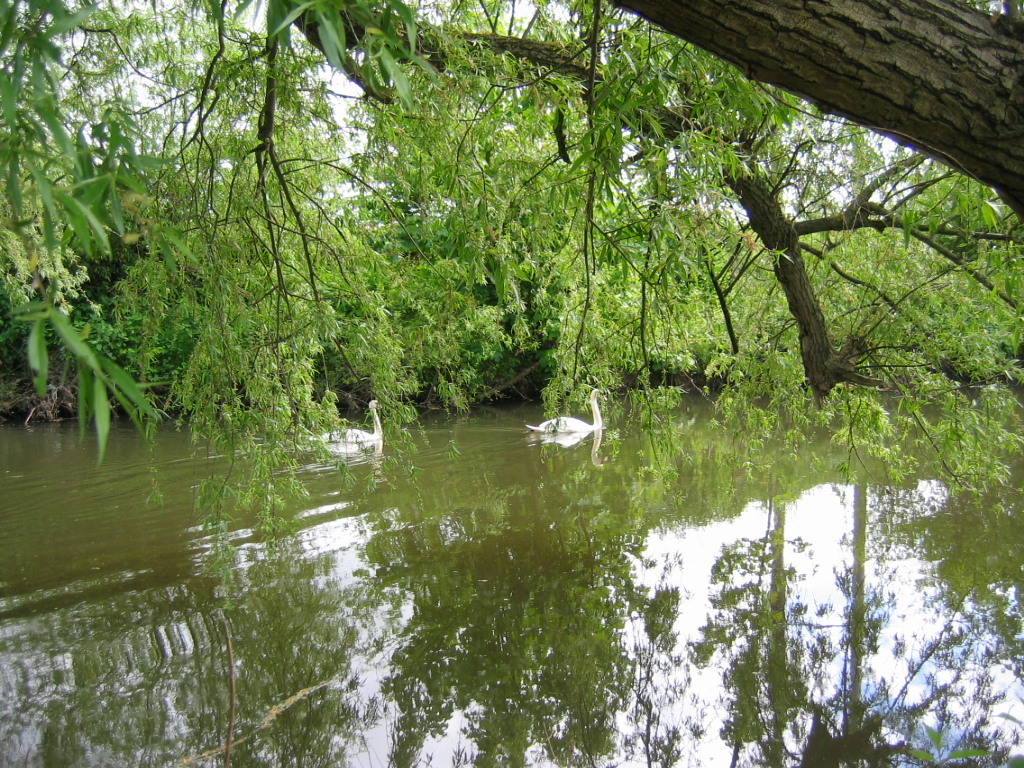
River Esk swans

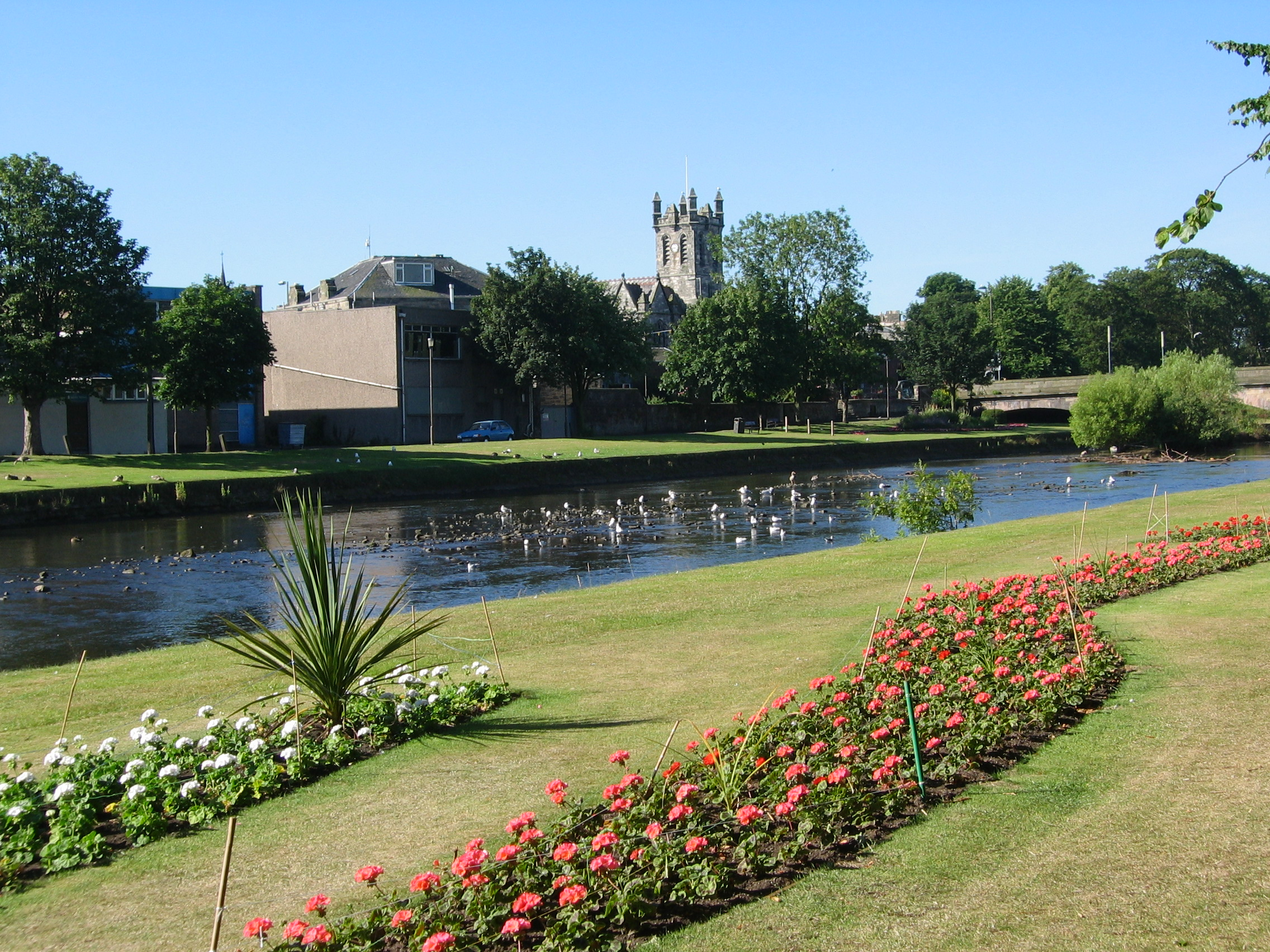
River Esk, Musselburgh

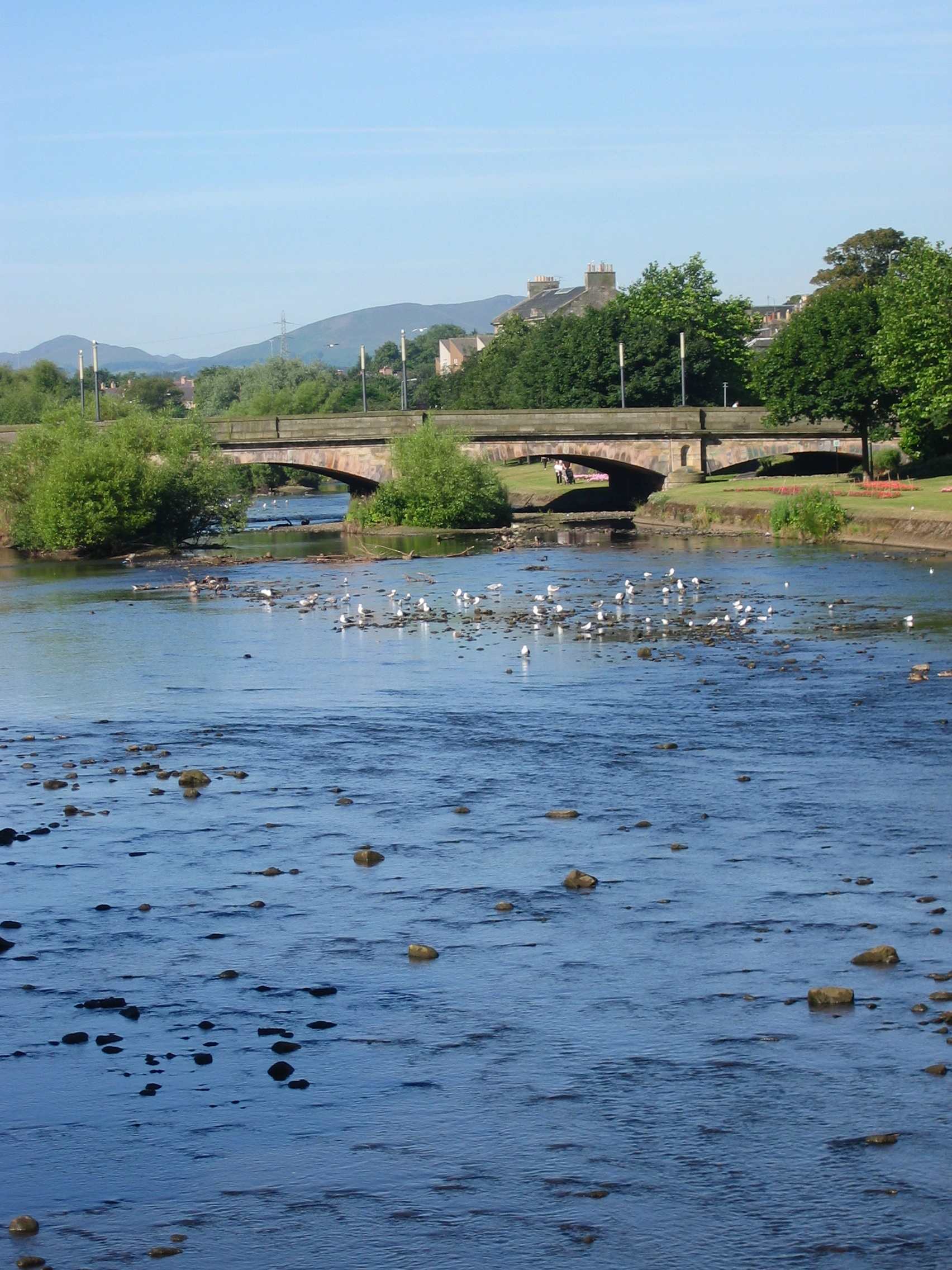
River Esk, Rennie's Bridge

== Bibliography ==
- Binnie, G M (1981). Early Victorian Water Engineers. Thomas Telford. ISBN 978-0-7277-0128-2.

== See also ==
- List of rivers of Scotland
- Rivers and Fisheries Trusts of Scotland (RAFTS)
- List of waterway societies in the United Kingdom
- List of navigation authorities in the United Kingdom
