= Saint-Clair-sur-Epte =

Commune of France

- Commune
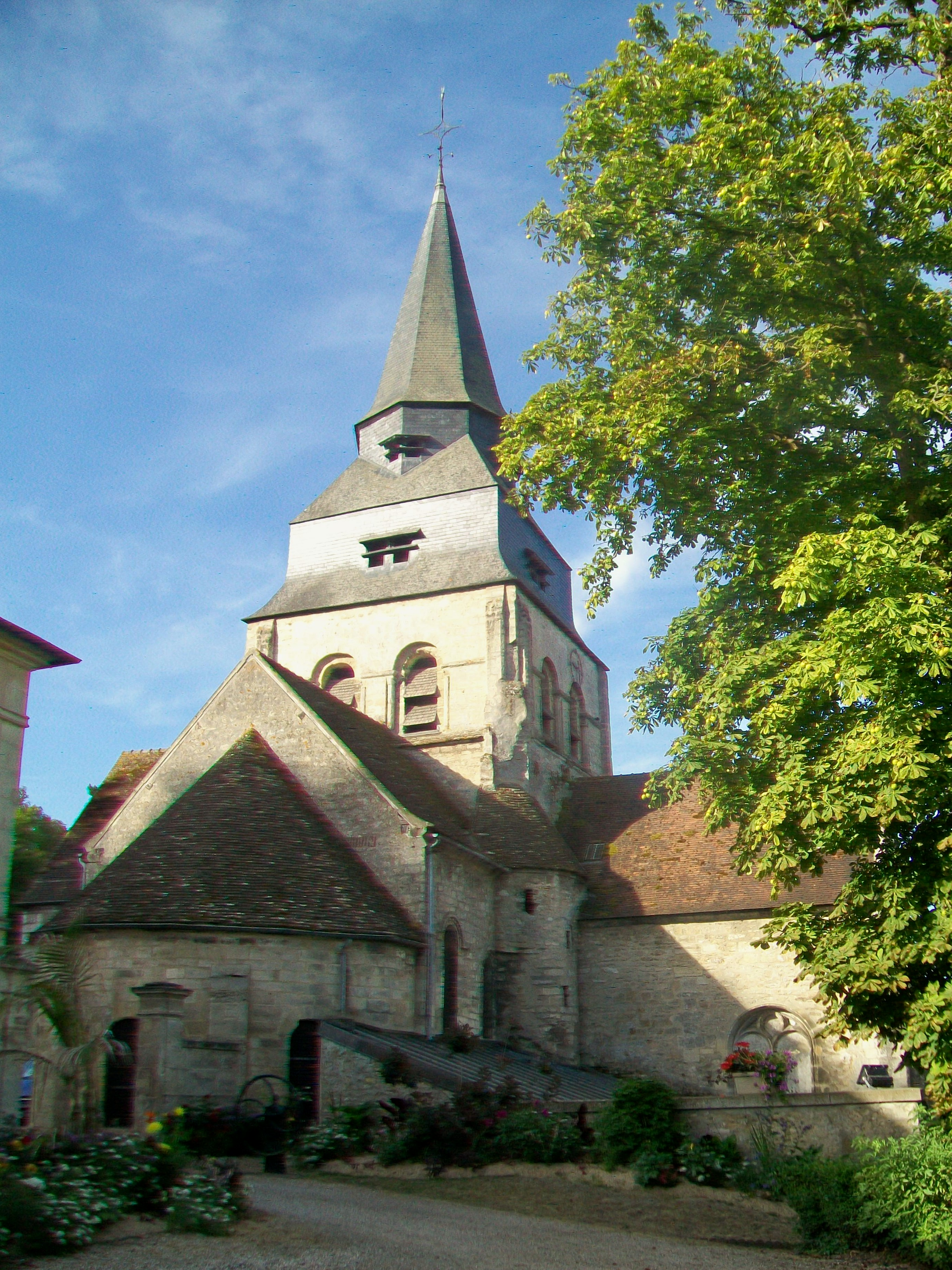
- The church of Our Lady, in Saint-Clair-sur-Epte

- Coat of arms
- Location of Saint-Clair-sur-Epte
- Location within France Location within Île-de-France (region)
- Coordinates: 49°12′29″N 1°40′49″E
- Country: France
- Region: Île-de-France
- Department: Val-d'Oise
- Arrondissement: Pontoise
- Canton: Vauréal

Government
  - Mayor (2020–2026): Christophe Depont
- Area^{1}: 12.18 km^{2} (4.70 sq mi)
- Highest elevation: 142 m (466 ft)
- Lowest elevation: 30 m (98 ft)
- Population (2023): 964
  - Density: 79.1/km^{2} (205/sq mi)
- Time zone: UTC+01:00 (CET)
  - Summer (DST): UTC+02:00 (CEST)
- INSEE/Postal code: 95541 /95770
- ^{1} French Land Register data, which excludes lakes, ponds, glaciers > 1 km^{2} (0.386 sq mi or 247 acres) and river estuaries.

Saint-Clair-sur-Epte (French pronunciation: [sɛ̃ klɛːʁ syʁ ɛpt]; literally 'Saint-Clair on Epte') is a commune in the Val-d'Oise department in Île-de-France in northern France. It is situated on the river Epte, 10 km southwest of Gisors.

The treaty of Saint-Clair-sur-Epte in 911 established Rollo, a Norse warlord and Viking leader, as the first Duke of Normandy.

Henry I of England seized the castle of Saint-Clair-sur-Epte in 1118.

== See also ==
- Communes of the Val-d'Oise department
