= Richard Augustine Hay =

Father Richard Augustine Hay (1661-c.1736) was prior of St. Pierremont, France, and antiquary.

== Life ==
Richard Hay was born in Edinburgh on 16 August 1661 and baptized in Tron Kirk. He was the second son of Captain George Hay; his paternal grandfather, Sir John Hay of Barra was the Lord Clerk Register of Scotland. His mother, Jean Spottiswood, was the daughter of Sir Henry Spottiswood, High Sheriff of Dublin. He was brought up with his cousins at Innerleithen, and Dysart.

When aged five his father died and his widowed mother, Jean Spottiswood, married James St. Clair of Rosslyn c.1667. Under the influence of his step-father, Hay became Catholic. At 13 he was sent to study at the Catholic Scots College at Paris. He also studied grammar at the College of Navarre. After four years he moved to Chartres and became a pensioner at St. Chéron's Abbey of Canons Regular and there completed his education in rhetoric.

In 1678 Hay became a canon regular at the Abbey of Saint Genevieve in Paris, adding the name "Augustine". He took his vows the following year and then went to Saint-Jacques de Provins staying two years during which he received the tonsure and the four minor orders. At the abbey of Saint-Pierre de Rillé at Fourères, Brittany, he studied philosophy and divinity being ordained sub-deacon and deacon in September 1683. Returning to Chartres he was ordained priest on 22 September 1685.

Two years later he was charged with re-establishing the Order of Canon's Regular in Scotland. He met King James at Windsor, and proceeded to Leith. However, the plan came to nought due to the 'Glorious Revolution' of 1688. Nonetheless, he found the opportunity to examine the documents held by the St. Clair family before being forced to return to France in June 1689. He became sub-prior at Hérivaux and then Essomes. In August 1694 he was appointed prior of Bernicourt, Champagne, and in January 1695 became prior of St.-Pierremont-en-Argonne.

The exact date of his return to Scotland is unknown but is likely to have been in the latter part of 1718. The following year he proposed a scheme to print John de Fordun's (c.1320-c.1387) Scotichronicon in which he was unsuccessful.

== Hay and the St. Clairs of Rosslyn ==
The St. Clair family (variously spelled: SaintClair, Saint Clair, SantClair, and other variants in historical records) were staunch Roman Catholics throughout the Scottish Reformation and beyond. Hay's integration by marriage into the St. Clair family at a young age ensured that he was brought up with the traditions of a noble Scottish family - albeit one at complete odds with the dominant, Protestant, version of the Christian faith at that time. This interest in his adopted family's history led him to examine the Sinclair family records held within Rosslyn Castle. Hay had some form of a library or office in the crypt of Rosslyn Chapel as he records that he lost several books from there when the chapel was attacked by a mob on the evening of 11 December 1688. This shows that he was very familiar with the castle and chapel owned by the St. Clair family. His transcriptions were later printed, in part, by James Maidment in 1835. These transcriptions reproduced Hay's copies of the Latin and Scots language originals. In 2002 a new edition of Hay's (as printed by Maidment) 'Genealogie' translated these into modern English.

His copies of these documents, which were written in English, Scots and Latin have been used extensively by historians since the loss of the originals. The manuscripts, preserved in the National Library of Scotland, are the main source for the history of the Sinclairs and of Rosslyn Chapel.

== Death ==
Hay died in poverty in the Cowgate, Edinburgh, 1736 the same year that the head of the St Clair family, William St Clair of Roslin, became the first Grand Master Mason of the Grand Lodge of Scotland.
