= Roslin, Midlothian =

Village in Midlothian, Scotland

Coordinates: 55.85822°N 3.16942°W

Roslin: Scottish Gaelic: Ros Linne
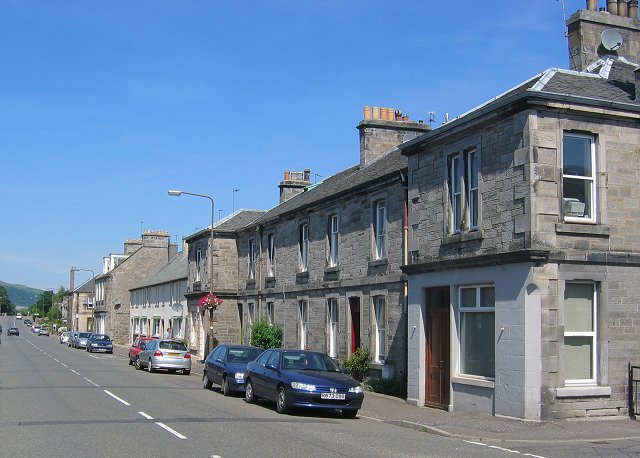
- The centre of the village

- Location within Midlothian
- Population: 1,770 (2020)
- OS grid reference: NT268634
- Council area: Midlothian
- Lieutenancy area: Midlothian
- Country: Scotland
- Sovereign state: United Kingdom
- Post town: ROSLIN
- Postcode district: EH25
- Dialling code: 0131
- Police: Scotland
- Fire: Scottish
- Ambulance: Scottish
- UK Parliament: Midlothian
- Scottish Parliament: Midlothian North and Musselburgh

Roslin (formerly spelt Rosslyn or Roslyn) is a village in Midlothian, Scotland, 11 kilometres (7 mi) to the south of the capital city Edinburgh. It stands on high ground, near the northwest bank of the river North Esk.

== The name ==
The name Roslin (recorded in 1138 as Roskelyn) appears to derive from Scottish Gaelic. The second element is clearly linne usually meaning a pond or a loch, but here probably means a waterfall and refers to the nearby Linn of Roslin. The first element is more obscure, but may derive from riasg meaning a peat moor. The theory that it is a corruption of Rose line, a supposed medieval meridian passing through Paris and Rosslyn Chapel, is fanciful.

Roslin is believed to be the source of the name for the Village of Roslyn, on Long Island, in the U.S. State of New York; its location reminded officials of the hills in Roslin. Roslindale, Massachusetts is also named after Roslin. Roslyn Avenue in Westmount, Canada, is named after the 1st Earl of Rosslyn.

== History ==
Legend has it the village was founded in 203 A.D. by Asterius, a Pict.

In 1303 Roslin was the site of a battle of the First War of Scottish Independence.

In 1446, Rosslyn Chapel was constructed, under the guide of William Sinclair, 1st Earl of Caithness.

Roslin became important as the seat of the St Clair (or Sinclair) family. In 1456 King James II granted it the status of a burgh. Coal mining has been a major occupation from the twelfth to the late twentieth centuries.

Roslin Inn dates from 1660 and was visited by Dr Johnson and James Boswell during their tour of Scotland in 1773, dining and drinking tea at the inn. Later in the 18th century Robert Burns breakfasted at the inn with Alexander Nasmyth.

From the 19th century onward, the attractions of the Glen, Castle and Chapel developed Roslin as a popular tourist destination. Notable visitors included J. M. W. Turner, William Wordsworth (who wrote a poem in the chapel whilst escaping a storm) and his sister Dorothy, who wrote "I never passed through a more delicious dell than the glen of Rosslyn". William Morris visited in March 1887, noting in his Socialist Diary that Roslin was "a beautiful glen-ny landscape much spoiled ... by the misery of Scotch building and a manufactory or two".

On the north-western side of the village used to be Roslin Institute, a biological research establishment, where in 1996 Dolly the sheep became the first animal to be cloned from an adult somatic cell. She moved to Easter Bush in 2011.

== Places of interest ==
The village sits on the west side of Roslin Glen, now a country park. Overlooking the Glen are Rosslyn Chapel and Roslin Castle.

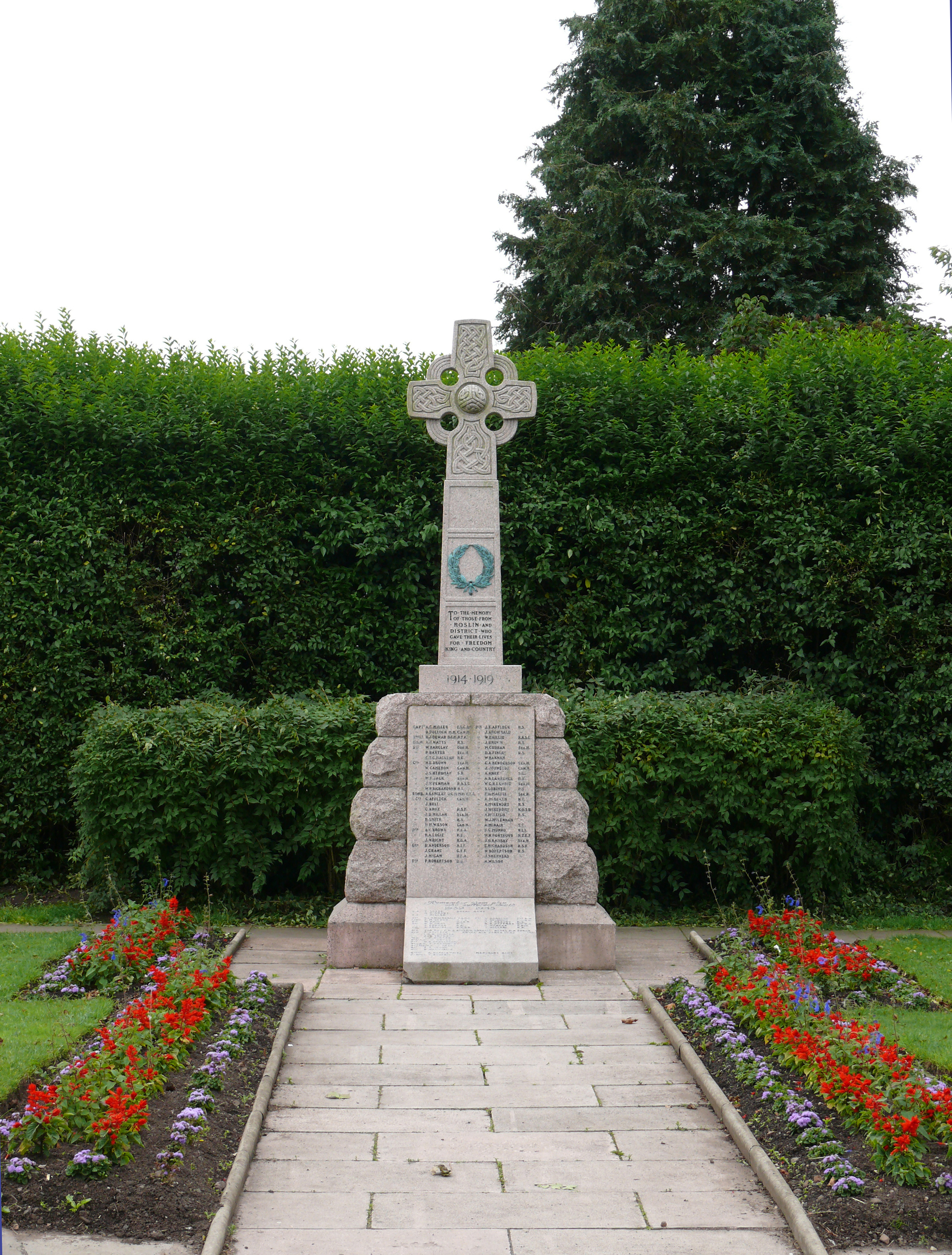
Roslin War Memorial

The elaborately carved chapel has long been associated with the Knights Templar and the Grail legend, and featured in the best-selling book The Da Vinci Code. The popularity of the book and the use of the chapel as a location in the subsequent film greatly increased the number of visitors to the village.

Rosslyn Castle, owned by the family of the Earl of Rosslyn since the 14th century, is in partial ruins. The habitable parts are let as holiday accommodation.

A monument cairn erected by the Roslin Heritage Society at the end of last century, marks the site of the Battle of Roslin.

== Notable residents ==
- James Gillespie (1726–1797), snuff-maker and philanthropist.
- David Gray, scored the winning goal in the 2016 Scottish Cup Final for Hibernian, their first win since 1902.
- John Lawson Johnston the inventor of Bovril, was born in Roslin in 1839.

== See also ==
- Clan Sinclair
- Sinclair (surname)
- Rosslyn Chapel
- Roslin Castle
- Toros Roslin, the most prominent Armenian manuscript illuminator in the High Middle Ages.
