= Roslin Castle =

Castle near Roslin in Midlothian, Scotland

- Roslin, Scotland; Grid Ref. NT274627
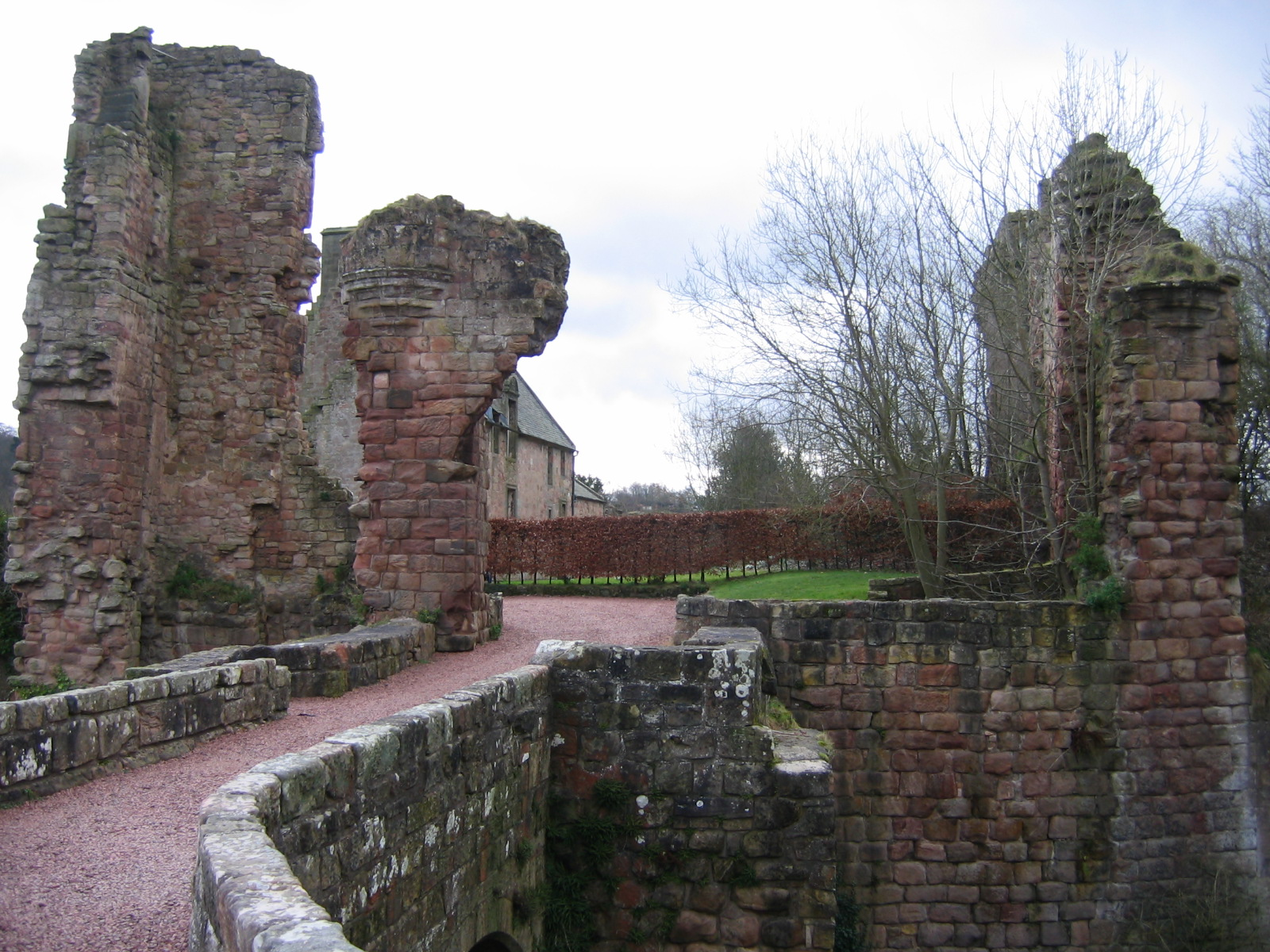
- The approach to Roslin Castle over the bridge, and showing the east range behind the ruined gatehouse.

Site information
- Owner: The 7th Earl of Rosslyn
- Condition: Partially ruined, partially habitable

Location
- Coordinates: 55°51′09.50″N 3°09′35.50″W

Site history
- Built: 14th to 17th centuries
- Built by: Henry I Sinclair, Earl of Orkney
- In use: 14th century to present
- Materials: Stone

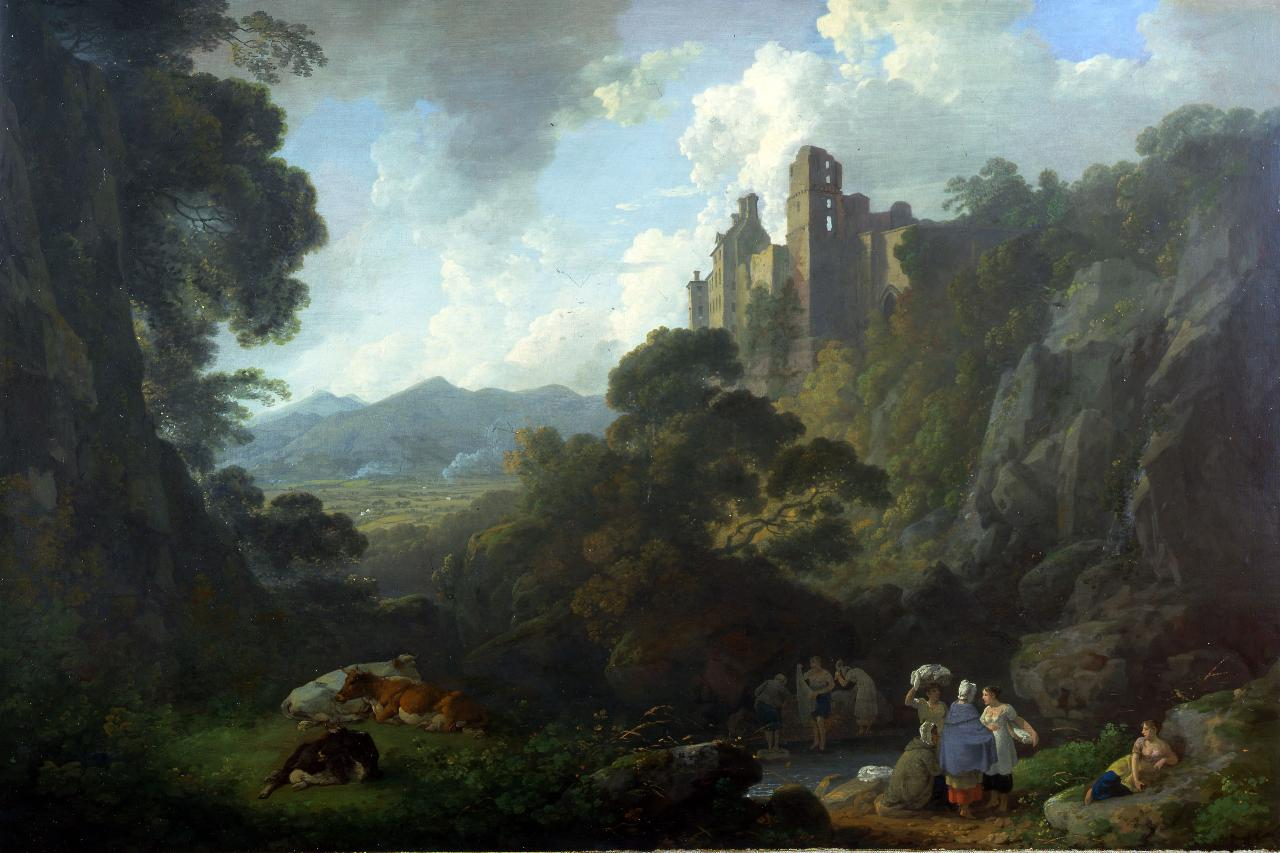
A view of Rosslyn Castle, 1803 by Julius Caesar Ibbetson

Roslin Castle (sometimes spelt Rosslyn) is a partially ruined castle near the village of Roslin in Midlothian, Scotland. It is located around 9 mi (14 km) south of Edinburgh, on the north bank of the North Esk, only a few hundred metres from the famous Rosslyn Chapel.

There has been a castle on the site since the early 14th century, when the Sinclair family, Earls of Caithness and Barons of Roslin, fortified the site, although the present ruins are of slightly later date. Following destruction during the War of the Rough Wooing of 1544, the castle was rebuilt. This structure, built into the cliffs of Roslin Glen, has remained at least partially habitable ever since. The castle is accessed via a high bridge, which replaced an earlier drawbridge. Roslin was renovated in the 1980s and now serves as holiday accommodation.

== History ==
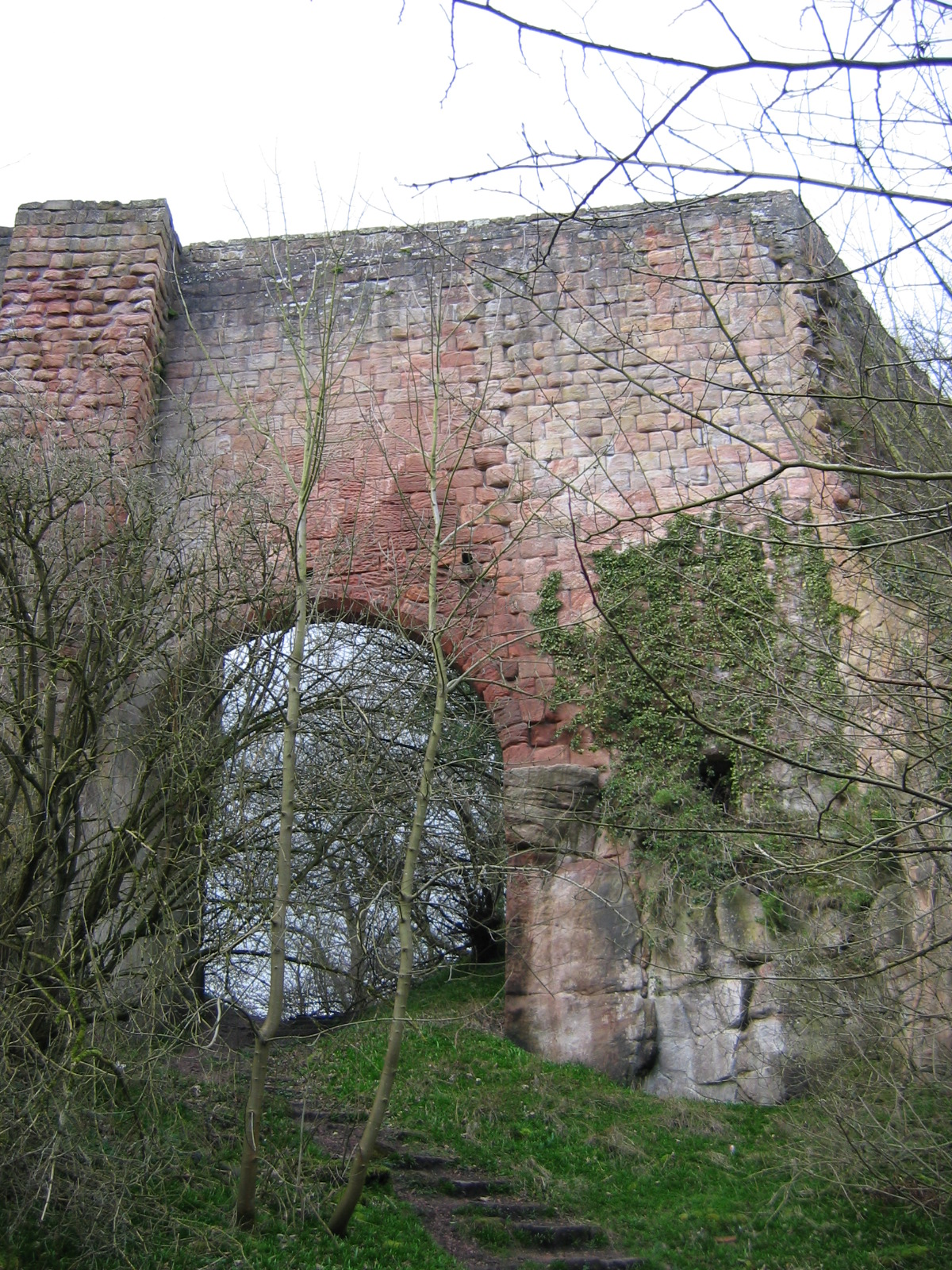
The bridge giving access to Roslin Castle

The first castle was built in either the late 14th or in early 15th century, perhaps begun by Henry Sinclair, Earl of Orkney, Baron of Roslin (c. 1345–1400). The Sinclair, or St Clare, family were of French origin, and have held Roslin since 1280. The castle was built on a rocky promontory near the site of the Battle of Roslin, where the Scots defeated the English in 1303. Henry's son Henry, 2nd Earl of Orkney (c. 1375–1422) built a new rectangular, round-cornered keep at the south-west corner. The courtyard was entered via a drawbridge over an artificial ditch, giving access to a pend in the small north range.

The castle contained a scriptorium during the 15th century, and five St Clair manuscripts, dating back to 1488, are in the National Library of Scotland. These include the Rosslyn-Hay manuscript, believed to be the earliest extant work in Scots prose. The castle was damaged by a domestic fire in 1452. Legend has it that during the fire the Earl was in consternation because of his valuable manuscripts, but they were lowered to safety from a window by his chaplain.

Roslin was more severely damaged by the Earl of Hertford, who burned the castle during the War of the Rough Wooing in 1544. The keep was almost totally destroyed, although its one remaining ruined wall can still be seen.

The castle was rebuilt in the late 16th century. A new five-storey east range was built into the side of the rock, and the gatehouse was rebuilt, this time with a permanent stone bridge. In 1591 the Laird of Roslin was forfeited, and the castle was held by William Leslie for the Earl of Huntly. The rebel Earl of Bothwell stayed, but left in a hurry leaving behind his coffers with clothes and silver plate.

The upper part of the east range was renovated in 1622, with renaissance details and carving to door and window surrounds. Roslin suffered again from the artillery of Cromwell’s commander in Scotland, General Monck, in 1650. It was further damaged by a Reforming mob in 1688. By the 18th century the structure was dilapidated, though part of the east range has always remained habitable.

James Erskine inherited the Rosslyn and Dysart estates in 1789, from his cousin James Paterson St Clair, upon which he adopted the surname of St Clair-Erskine. In 1805, he inherited the title of Earl of Rosslyn (created 1801 for Alexander Wedderburn); since that date, the Rosslyn estate has been in possession of the Earl of Rosslyn.

From 1982 to 1988, the east range was restored by architects Simpson and Brown. The current owner, The 7th Earl of Rosslyn, a descendant of the Sinclairs, leases the castle as holiday accommodation via the Landmark Trust. The castle is a Scheduled Ancient Monument, and a Category A listed building.

== Architecture ==
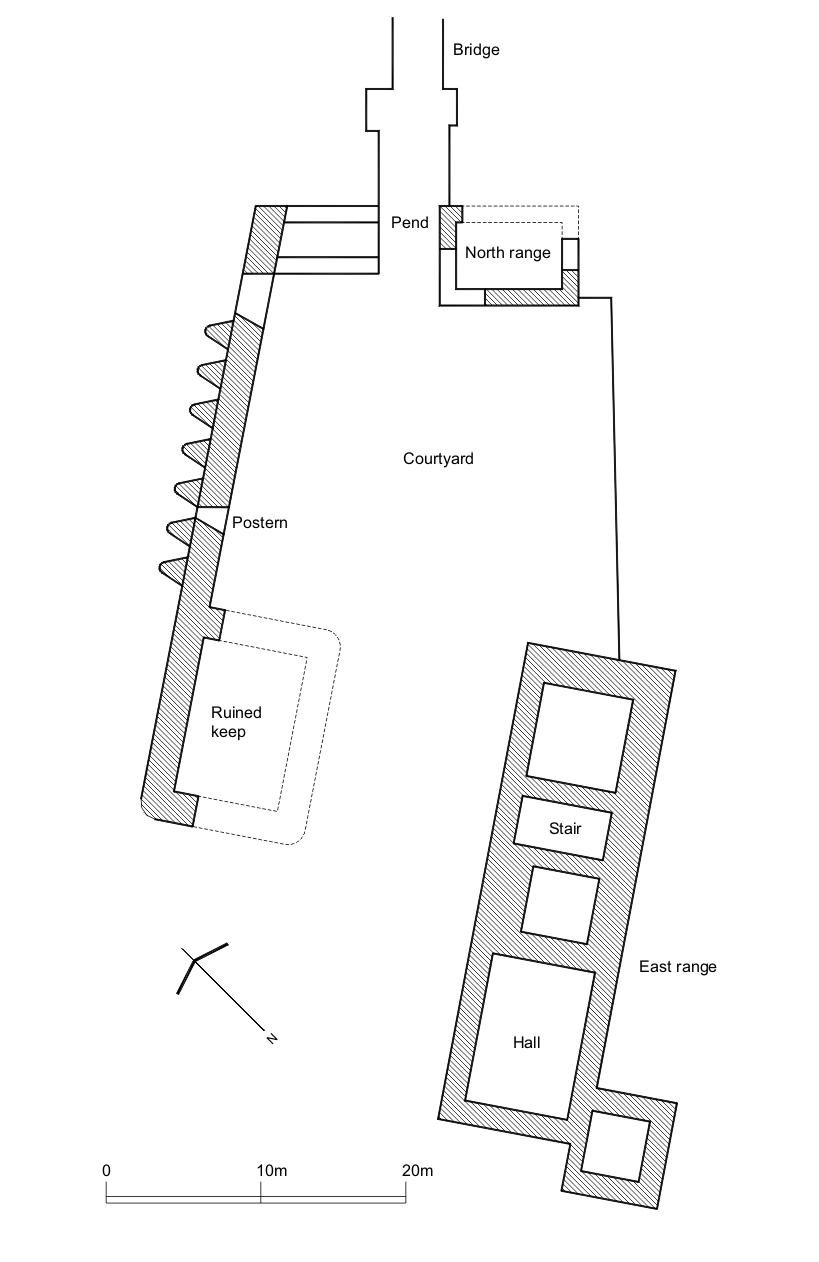
Plan of Roslin Castle

The castle stands precipitously above a loop of the River North Esk, which protects it on three sides. This rocky promontory was breached on the north side to form a ditch giving further protection. The castle is approached from Roslin across this ditch, via a precipitous bridge and through the ruined gatehouse.

=== Ruins ===
The remains of the gatehouse and north range comprise only fragments of walls and one side of the entrance arch, with the remains of a bartizan above. Along the west side of the castle, the 15th-century curtain wall remains standing to a considerable height. This section of wall has six openings at the base, one of which served as a postern gate. On the outer face, the six bays are divided by rounded buttresses. Old sketches of Roslin show bartizans above each of these buttresses, with a wall-walk connecting them.

To the south of this wall is the remaining wall of the keep. The mound beneath is formed from the collapsed remnants of the other three walls. The ruin suggests that the keep was around 16m by 12m, with walls 2.9m thick rising to a machicolated parapet.

=== East range ===
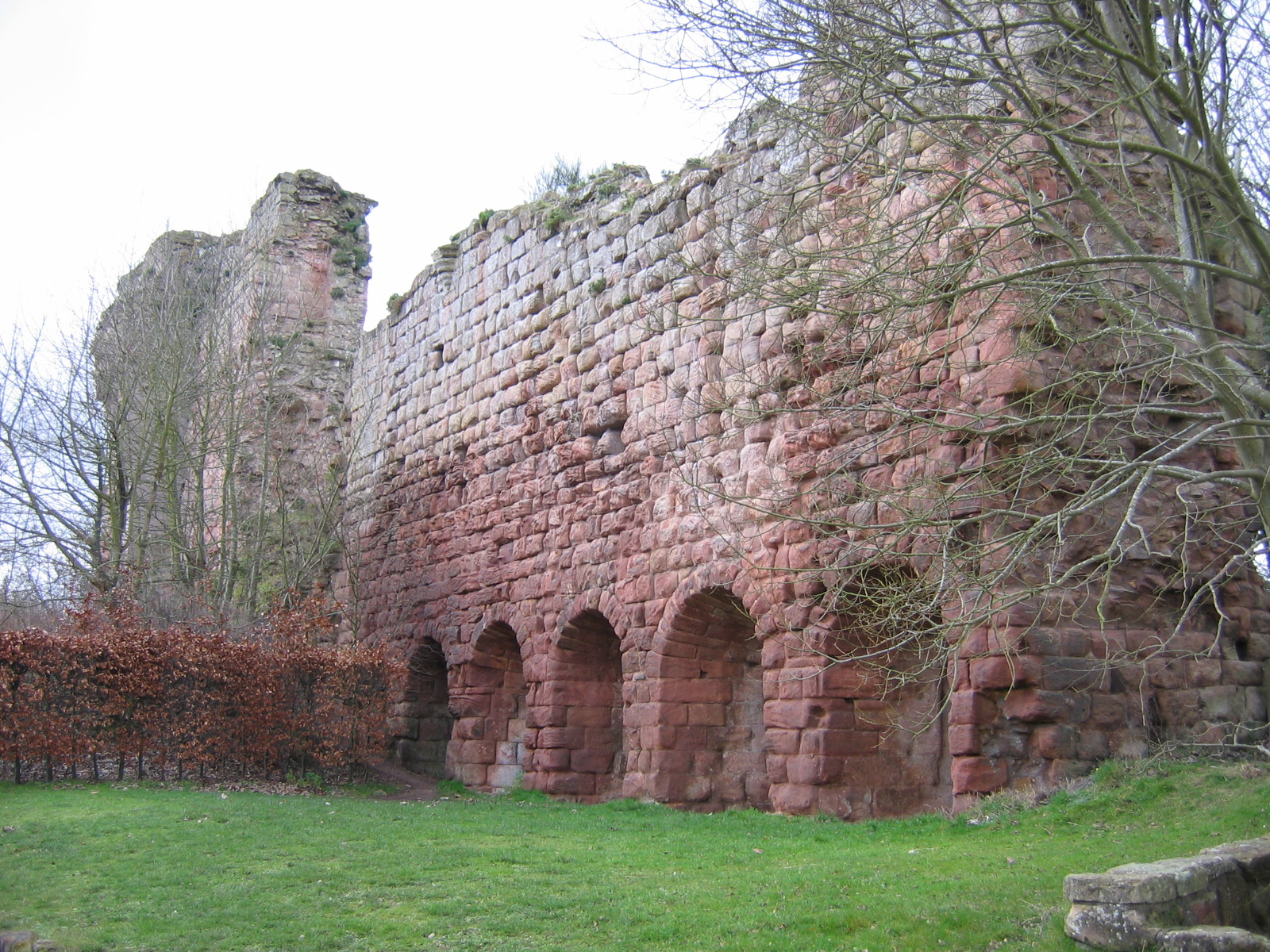
The west curtain wall, with the ruined keep beyond.

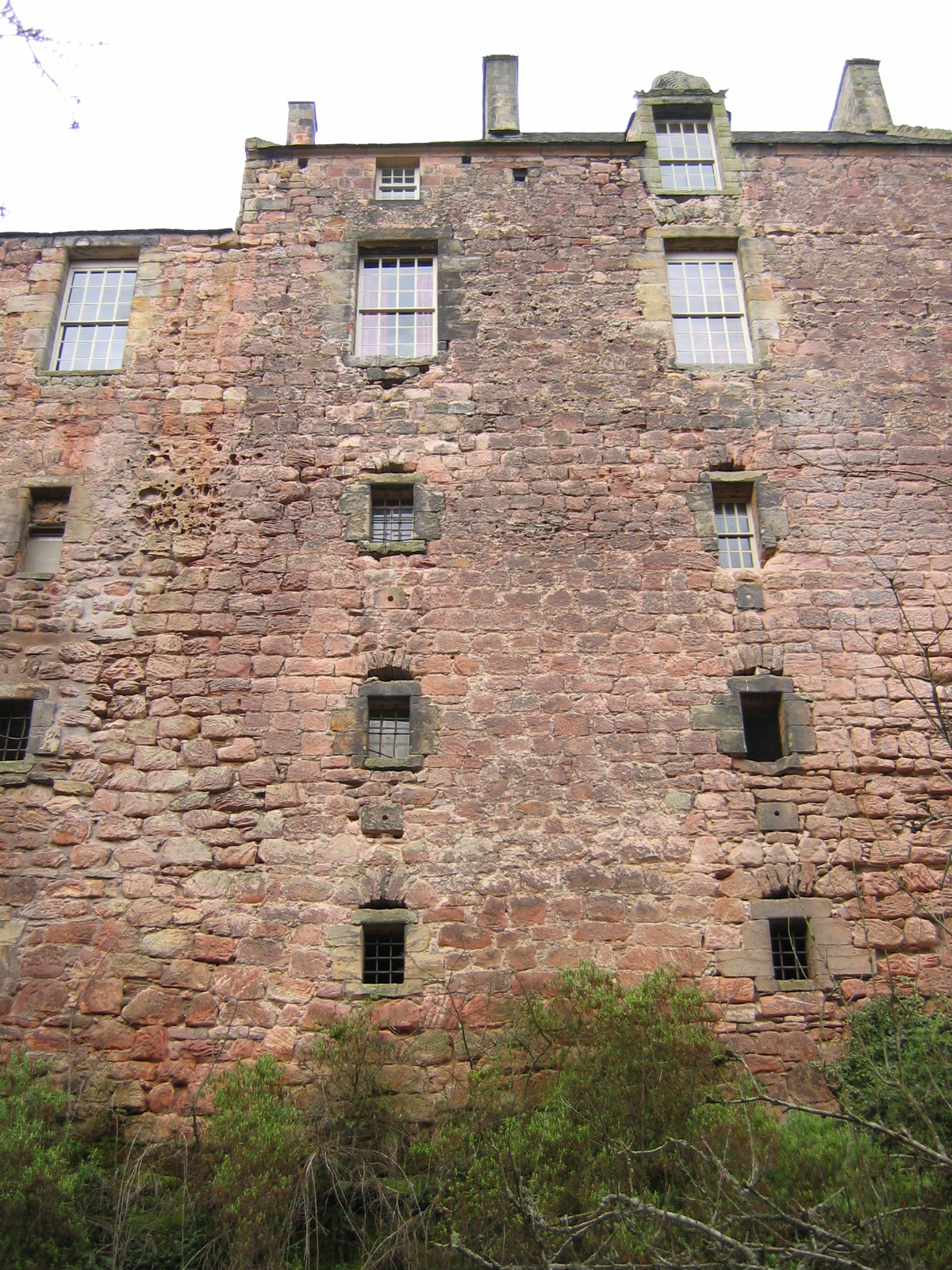
East facade of the east range, showing the large windows to the principal rooms above, with smaller windows to the service areas below.

The restored east range measures around 31m by 10m, with a pitched roof and crow-step gables. It is entered through a richly carved doorway, dated 1622 and initialled SWS for Sir William Sinclair, which gives access to the third floor. The three lower floors are cut into the rock, and each has four vaulted rooms, with a fifth in the south-east tower. These lower levels were used for service rooms, with the principal rooms in the two upper floors. At the lowest level was a kitchen, with a bakehouse above. On the exterior, gunloops are found on the south wall, with several shot-holes on the east.

All five floors are connected by a central scale-and-platt staircase, added in the early 17th century to replace a turnpike stair in the south-west. The rooms of the upper floors have impressive panelling and decorated ceilings. The main hall, in the south part of the block, has been divided, but retains a large fireplace with the carved initials WS and JE, for William Sinclair and his wife Jean Edmonstone, and the date 1597.

== Popular culture ==
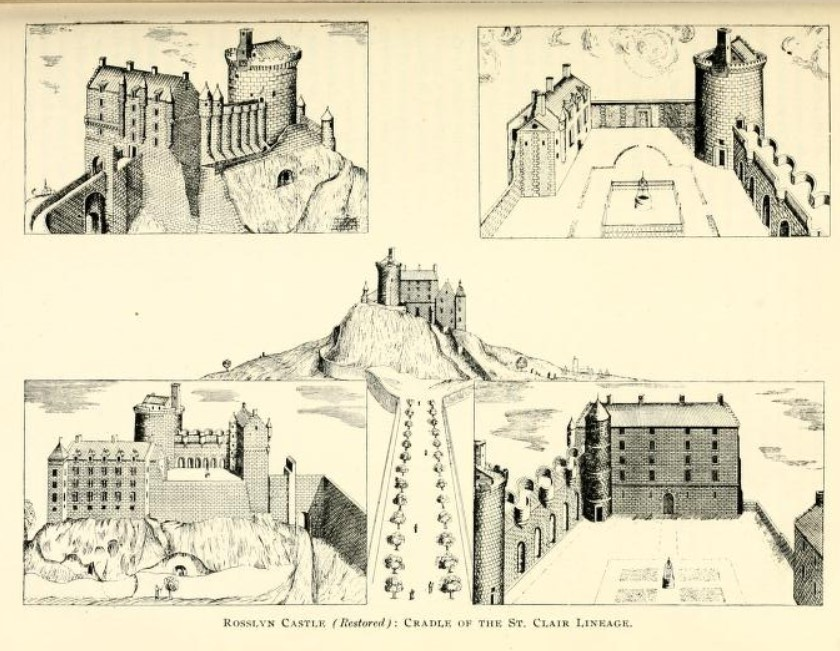
Rosslyn or Roslin Castle reconstruction image

Roslin Castle is one of the places featuring in Sir Walter Scott's poem Rosabelle. A ballad named Roslin Castle was written in the 18th century by Richard Hewitt of Cumberland, the lyrics and music of which are recorded in volume one of the Scots Musical Museum collection of Scottish songs. The castle was also used as a location for Ron Howard's film adaptation of Dan Brown's book, The Da Vinci Code.

The castle features in the 1810 historical novel The Scottish Chiefs by Jane Porter.

== See also ==
- Clan Sinclair
- Earl of Caithness
- Knights Templar
- Rosslyn Chapel
- Sinclair & Girnigoe Castle
