= List of castles in Highland (Scotland) =

This is a list of castles in the Highland council area of Scotland.

== List ==
| Name | Type | Date | Condition | Ownership | Location | Notes | Picture |
|---|---|---|---|---|---|---|---|
| Aberscross Castle | | | No remains | | | | |
| Achnacarry Castle | | | Occupied | | | | |
| Ackergill Tower | | | Occupied | | | | |
| Ardtornish Castle | | | Ruin | | | | |
| Ardvreck Castle | | | Ruin | | | | |
| Armadale Castle | | | Ruin | | | | |
| Ballone Castle | Z-plan tower house | late 16th century | Restored as residence | Private | near Portmahomack | Restored from scratch after 1990 | |
| Balnagown Castle | | | Occupied | | | | |
| Balquholly Castle | | | Occupied | | 57° 30′ 44″ N, 2° 24′ 25″ W | Now known as Hatton Castle, originally owned by same Mowatts who owned Buchollie Castle | |
| Beaufort Castle | | | Occupied | | | | |
| Borve Castle, Benbecula | | | Ruin | | | | |
| Borve Castle, Sutherland | | | Ruin | | | | |
| Braal Castle | | | Ruin | | | | |
| Brahan Castle | | | Ruin | | | | |
| Brims Castle | | | Ruin | | | | |
| Bucholly Castle | | 15th century (possibly on the site of a 12th-century fortress) | Ruin | | near Freswick in Caithness | | |
| Caisteal Maol | | | Ruin | | | | |
| Carbisdale Castle | | | Occupied | | | | |
| Chanonry Castle | | | No remains | | | | |
| Castle of Mey | Historic House | | Occupied | | | | |
| Cawdor Castle | Historic House | Begun in 1454, with keep dating to this period. Mostly 17th century | Occupied | | Nairnshire | | |
| Castle Craig | | | Ruin | | | | |
| Dalcross Castle | L-plan | 17th century | Occupied | Private | Dalcross, Highland | Nairnshire | |
| Daviot Castle | | | Site | | Daviot, Highland | | |
| Dingwall Castle | | | Ruin | | Dingwall | | |
| Dornoch Castle | | | Occupied | | | | |
| Dounreay Castle | L-plan | 16th century | Ruin | | Within the grounds of Dounreay Nuclear Power Development Establishment | | |
| Dunbeath Castle | | | Occupied | | | | |
| Dun Ringill | | | Ruin | | | | |
| Dunrobin Castle | | | Occupied | | | Castle open | |
| Dunscaith Castle | | | Ruin | | | | |
| Duntulm Castle | | | Ruin | | | | |
| Dunvegan Castle | Historic House | | Occupied | | | | |
| Eilean Donan Castle | | | | | Dornie | Rebuilt in 20th century | |
| Erchless Castle | | | Occupied | Private | Struy | | |
| Foulis Castle | | | Occupied | | | | |
| Forse Castle | | | Ruin | | | | |
| Freswick | | | Occupied | | | | |
| Glengarry Castle | | | | | | Alternative name for Invergarry Castle? | |
| Castle Grant | | | Occupied | Private | | | |
| Helmsdale Castle | | 15th century | No remains | | Helmsdale, Sutherland | Demolished in the 1970s | |
| Invergarry Castle | | 17th century | Ruin | Invergarry Castle Preservation Trust | Loch Oich, Great Glen | Ruins under preservation | |
| Inverlochy Castle | | C13 | Ruin | Historic Environment Scotland | nr Fort William | | |
| Inverness Castle | | Largely C19 | Occupied | Highland Council | | Part used as Court Houses | |
| Keiss Castle | | | Ruin | | | | |
| Kilravock Castle | | | Occupied | | Nairnshire | Rose family | |
| Kinloch Castle | | | Occupied | | | | |
| Kinlochaline Castle | | | Occupied | | | | |
| Knock Castle | | | Ruin | | | | |
| Castle Leod | | | Occupied | | | | |
| Lochindorb Castle | | | Ruin | | | | |
| Milntown Castle | | | No remains | | | | |
| Mingarry Castle | Medieval hall | 13th century | Ruin | | Ardnamurchan Peninsula | Undergoing preservation, renovation and restoration | |
| Muckrach Castle | | | Occupied | | | | |
| Moniack Castle | | | Occupied | | | | |
| Newmore Castle | | | Ruin | | | | |
| Castle of Old Wick | | 14th Century | Ruin | Historic Environment Scotland | Wick, Caithness | | |
| Ormlie | | | | | | | |
| Ormond Castle | | | Ruin | | | Also known as Avoch Castle | |
| Petty Castle | | | Ruin | | | Also known as Halhill | |
| Rait Castle | | 14th century | Ruin | Private | Nairnshire | http://her.highland.gov.uk/SingleResult.aspx?uid=MHG45363 | |
| Redcastle or Castle Roy | | | Ruin | | | | |
| Scrabster Castle | 12th century | | Ruin | | 58.601013°N 3.538941°W | Bishop's castle | |
| Sinclair & Girnigoe Castle | | | Ruin | | | | |
| Skibo Castle | | | Occupied | | | | |
| Strome Castle | | | Ruin | National Trust for Scotland | | | |
| Castle Stuart | Tower house | 1625 | Restored as residence | Private | | | |
| Tarradale Castle | | | | | | | |
| Teaninich Castle | | | Occupied | | | | |
| Castle Tioram | | | Ruin | | | | |
| Tor Castle | Tower house | 14th century | Ruin | | | | |
| Tulloch Castle | | 16th century | Occupied | | | | |
| Urquhart Castle | | | Ruin | Historic Environment Scotland | 57.324°N 4.442°W | | |
| Varrich Castle | | 1000AD? | Ruin | | Tongue, Highland | | |

== See also ==
- Castles in Scotland
- List of castles in Scotland
- List of listed buildings in Highland
