= Pentland =

Pentland may refer to:

== Places ==
=== Scotland ===
- Pentland Firth, a strait between Orkney and Caithness in the far north
- Pentland Skerries, a group of islands lying in the Pentland Firth
- Pentland Hills, a range just south of Edinburgh in the south-east
  - Pentland Rising, or Battle of Rullion Green, a key conflict in the development of Scottish Presbyterianism
- Edinburgh Pentlands (disambiguation), the name of two parliamentary constituencies
- Old Pentland, a hamlet in Midlothian
- New Pentland, a hamlet in Midlothian

=== United States ===
- Pentland, California, an unincorporated community
- Pentland Township, Michigan, a civil township

=== Elsewhere ===
- Pentland, Queensland, Australia, a town
- Pentland Corners, Ontario, Canada, a community

== People with the surname ==
- Joseph Barclay Pentland (1797–1873), Irish geographer
- Baron Pentland, extinct hereditary peerage in the UK
  - John Sinclair, 1st Baron Pentland (1860–1925), Scottish politician
  - Henry John Sinclair, 2nd Baron Pentland (1907–1984)
- Alexander Pentland (1884–1983), Australian World War I flying ace
- Alex Pentland (born 1951), MIT Professor and entrepreneur
- Barbara Pentland (1912–2000), Canadian composer
- Fred Pentland (1883–1962), English footballer and manager
- Norman Pentland (1912–1972), British Labour Member of Parliament for Chester-le-Street
- Patrick Pentland (born 1969), Irish musician and member of the Canadian rock band, Sloan
- Rebekah Pentland (born 1978), Australian politician
- Robert Pentland (1908–1975), American politician

== People with the given name ==
- Pentland Hick (born 1919), British entrepreneur and author

== Other uses ==
- Pentland (crater), on the Moon
- Pentland Ferries which operates in the Pentland Firth
- Pentland Group plc, a privately held, global brand management company based in the UK
- Lord Pentland (judicial title) (born 1957), Senator of the College of Justice (Scotland)
