= Scheduled monuments in Highland =

Highland shown within Scotland

A scheduled monument in Scotland is a nationally important archaeological site or monument which is given legal protection by being placed on a list (or "schedule") maintained by Historic Environment Scotland. The aim of scheduling is to preserve the country's most significant sites and monuments as far as possible in the form in which they have been inherited.

The process of scheduling is governed by the Ancient Monuments and Archaeological Areas Act 1979, which aims "to make provision for the investigation, preservation and recording of matters of archaeological or historical interest". The term "scheduled monument" can apply to the whole range of archaeological sites which have been deliberately constructed by human activity but are not always visible above ground. They range from prehistoric standing stones and burial sites, through Roman remains and medieval structures such as castles and monasteries, to later structures such as industrial sites and buildings constructed for the World Wars. Some buildings or structures which were both scheduled and listed have had their listing designations removed to reduce the duplication.

In 2017 there were 8238 scheduled monuments in Scotland.

== Notable Scheduled Monuments in Highland ==
Name	Location	Description	Ref No	Image
Old St Peter's Church	Thurso	Remains of 13th-century (or earlier) church	SM618	
Braal Castle	Halkirk	Ruined 14th-century castle	SM619	
Bucholly Castle	Canisbay	Remains of 15th-century castle	SM620	
Forse Castle	Latheron	Ruined clifftop 13th-century fort	SM621	
Castle Girnigoe and Castle Sinclair	Wick	Two adjacent ruined castles on rocky promontary	SM622	
Keiss Castle	Wick	Ruined 16th- or 17th-century clifftop castle	SM623	
Reisgill Old Bridge	Reisgill, Latheron	Old North Road (A99) bridge over Reisgill Burn	SM624	
Rubh'an Dunain Chambered Cairn	Bracadale, Isle of Skye	Prehistoric chambered cairn	SM901	
Dunscaith Castle (Dun Scaich)	Tokavaig, Sleat	Rruined castle on the coast of the Isle of Skye	SM954	
Castle Tioram & Eilean Tirim	Lochaber	Ruined castle on the tidal island of Eilean Tioram	SM955	
Rait Castle	Nairn	Small masonry hall-house probably from late 13th/early 14th century.	SM1235	
Clach a' Charridh (Shandwick Stone)	Nigg	Finely carved Pictish cross-slab	SM1674	
Nigg Stone	Nigg	Finely carved Pictish cross-slab	SM1680	
Baile Mhargaite (Sandy Dun) (Lochan Druim An Duin)	Farr	A broch or dun in a high location on a rocky bluff	SM1879	
Ardvreck Castle	Assynt	Ruined castle on a rocky peninsula into Loch Assynt	SM1895	
Castle Varrich (Casteal Bharriach)	Tongue	Ruined small tower-house	SM1896	
Borve Castle	Farr	Ruined stronghold of Clan Mackay	SM2112	
Ardtornish Castle	Morvern	Ruined hall-house which was a major seat of the Lords of the Isles.	SM2906	
Duntulm Castle	Trotternish, Isle of Skye	Ruined 14th- and 15th-century courtyard castle	SM5307	
Invergarry Castle	Kilmonivaig	Ruined seat of the Clan MacDonell of Glengarry	SM5481	
Smoo Cave	Durness	Cave with prehistoric remains of occupation	SM5482	
Knock Castle (Caisteal Camus)	Sleat, Isle of Skye	Ruined medieval castle	SM8480	
Dingwall Castle	Dingwall	Ruined castle in the private garden of The Castle House	SM9678	
Beauly Priory	Kilmorack	Remains of 13th-century Valliscaulian priory	SM90031	
Fortrose Cathedral	Fortrose	Ruined 13th century cathedral	SM90147	
Inverlochy Castle	Kilmonivaig	Ruined 13th-century castle	SM90172	
Urquhart Castle	Drumnadrochit	Remains of a medieval castle on a promontory on the shore of Loch Ness	SM90309	

== See also ==
- List of Category A listed buildings in Highland
