= List of shipwrecks in July 1880 =

The list of shipwrecks in July 1880 includes ships sunk, foundered, grounded, or otherwise lost during July 1880.

== 1 July ==
List of shipwrecks: 1 July 1880
Ship	State	Description
Drumclog	United Kingdom	The East Indiaman, a barque, was driven ashore at Porlan Point, Burma. Her crew survived. She subsequently became a wreck.
F. W. Harris	United Kingdom	The steamship was driven ashore and wrecked at Chain Coves Head, near Cape Race, Newfoundland Colony. Her 23 crew remained on the wreck for three days before leaving in four boats and reaching the shore. She was on a voyage from Cardiff, Glamorgan to Montreal, Quebec, Canada.
Maggie M	United Kingdom	The barque was driven ashore and severely damaged at Europa Point, Gibraltar. She was on a voyage from Cette, Hérault, France to Sydney, New South Wales. She was refloated and towed in to Gibraltar.

== 2 July ==
List of shipwrecks: 2 July 1880
Ship	State	Description
Condor	United Kingdom	The ship was driven ashore on the Swedish coast. She was refloated and towed in to "Engesberg", Sweden in a waterlogged condition. She was consequently condemned.
Drei Gebruder	Germany	The galiot was driven ashore at Kuressaare, Russia. She was on a voyage from Hamburg to Saint Petersburg, Russia. She was refloated and towed in to Riga, Russia in a leaky condition.
Horten	Norway	The barque collided with a steamship and was beached at Camber, Sussex, United Kingdom, where she was wrecked. She was on a voyage from Havre de Grâce, Seine-Inférieure, France to Helsingør, Denmark. She was refloated on 5 July and towed in to Dover, Kent, United Kingdom by the tug Dragon Fly (United Kingdom).
Three Brothers	New Zealand	The cutter foundered the Hauraki Gulf with the loss of all three crew.

== 3 July ==
List of shipwrecks: 3 July 1880
Ship	State	Description
Bear	(Dominion of Newfoundland) Newfoundland Colony	The steamship struck a reef off St. Shott's and was damaged. She was on a voyage from Sydney, Nova Scotia, Canada to Saint John's. She completed her voyage in a severely leaky condition.
Boston	United Kingdom	The schooner ran aground and sank on the Burbo Bank, in Liverpool Bay. She was on a voyage from Garston, Lancashire to Rostrevor, County Down.
Jane	United Kingdom	The ship was driven ashore at Newhaven, Sussex. She was on a voyage from London to Maryport, Cumberland. She was refloated and resumed her voyage.
Jane Hannah	New Zealand	The schooner ran aground at the head of Akaroa Harbour in a heavy gale. All four crew were drowned.
Loa	Chilean Navy	War of the Pacific: The transport ship was sunk in Callao Bay by an explosive device placed aboard by the Peruvians. About 40 survivors were rescued by Alaska, Decres, Garibaldi, Senquin and Thetis (Flags unknown). Loa was subsequently salvaged and used as a hulk.
Manne du Cel	France	The lugger sprang a leak in the North Channel and was abandoned approximately 10 nautical miles (19 km) off Lizard Point, Cornwall, United Kingdom. Her four crew were rescued. She was on a voyage from Newport, Monmouthshire, United Kingdom to Saint-Servan, Ille-et-Vilaine.
Reine du Ciel	France	The ship foundered off St. Ives, Cornwall. Her crew were rescued. She was on a voyage from Cardiff, Glamorgan, United Kingdom to Saint-Servan, Ille-et-Vilaine.

== 4 July ==
List of shipwrecks: 4 July 1880
Ship	State	Description
Dreadnought	United Kingdom	The schooner was driven ashore nearn "Nabardad". She was a total loss.
Elmina	United Kingdom	The yacht was driven ashore near Sandhamn, Norway. Her crew were rescued.
Falcon	United Kingdom	The yacht was run into by the steamship Dundee (United Kingdom) and sank in the River Tay. All three people on board were rescued by Dundee. Falcon was refloated on 6 July and beached at Dundee, Forfarshire.

== 5 July ==
List of shipwrecks: 5 July 1880
Ship	State	Description
Corea	Flag unknown	The steamship ran aground on Clermont Island. She was refloated and taken in to Thursday Island.
Salien	United Kingdom	The steamship ran aground in Palmer's Creek, County Limerick.

== 6 July ==
List of shipwrecks: 6 July 1880
Ship	State	Description
Freia	Denmark	The ship sank in the North Sea. She was on a voyage from Middlesbrough, Yorkshire, United Kingdom to Skien.
Main	Germany	The steamship ran aground in the English Channel near the Shambles Lightship ( Trinity House). She was on a voyage from New York, United States to Southampton, Hampshire, United Kingdom and Bremen. She was refloated and taken in to Southampton.

== 7 July ==
List of shipwrecks: 7 July 1880
Ship	State	Description
Advance	United Kingdom	The barque sprang a leak and foundered in the Atlantic Ocean. Her crew were rescued by the barque Lorenzo (United Kingdom). Advance was on a voyage from Liverpool, Lancashire to Java, Netherlands East Indies.
Brothers	United Kingdom	The schooner went ashore on Cardiff Sands, Glamorgan. after striking a wreck, and filled with the tide; her crew reached Cardiff. Wreck later sold "as lies".
Cyrenian	United Kingdom	The steamship ran aground at Livorno, Italy. She was refloated the next day.
Duque de Loule	Portugal	The schooner collided with the steamship Ruperra (United Kingdom) and sank off Cabo da Roca. Her crew were rescued by Ruperra.
Edith Hough	United Kingdom	The steamship was driven ashore at Rønne, Denmark. She was on a voyage from Riga, Russia to Liverpool, Lancashire. She was refloated with assistance from the steamship Neptune (Sweden) and towed in to Stockholm, Sweden.
Surprise	United Kingdom	The schooner ran aground in the Pennington Spit, in the Solent. She was on a voyage from Cowes, Isle of Wight to Dartmouth, Devon. She was refloated and resumed her voyage.
Titania	United Kingdom	The brigantine collided with an iceberg and sank in the Atlantic Ocean 50 nautical miles (93 km) south east of Cape Spear, Newfoundland Colony with the loss of one of her six crew. Survivors were rescued by a fishing boat. Titania was on a voyage from Saint John's, Newfoundland Colony to Miramichi, New Brunswick, Canada.
Wave	United Kingdom	The smack sprang a leak and foundered off the Ower Sand. Her crew were rescued.

== 8 July ==
List of shipwrecks: 8 July 1880
Ship	State	Description
Princess Royal	United Kingdom	The smack was abandoned off the "Rock Light". Her crew were rescued. She was on a voyage from Whitehaven, Cumberland to Ditton Brook, Cheshire. Princess Royal was discovered by the steamship Wellington (United Kingdom) and towed in to Lytham, Lancashire.

== 9 July ==
List of shipwrecks: 9 July 1880
Ship	State	Description
Bengal	United Kingdom	The steamship ran aground at Bushire, Persia. She was on a voyage from London to Bushire. She was refloated on 12 July.
George and Elizabeth	United Kingdom	The dandy capsized and sank in the River Taff. She was on a voyage from Cardiff, Glamorgan to Bideford, Devon.
Unnamed	Flag unknown	A barque ran aground on the West Hoyle Bank, in Liverpool Bay.

== 10 July ==
List of shipwrecks: 10 July 1880
Ship	State	Description
Alert	United Kingdom	The steamship struck The Manacles, Cornwall and was holed. She was consequently beached. Following temporary repairs she was towed to Falmouth, Cornwall that evening.
Aquiline	United Kingdom	The yacht ran aground at Oban, Argyllshire. She was refloated and taken in to Oban for temporary repairs.
Eros	United Kingdom	The brigantine collided with the steamship Ymuiden (Netherlands) and sank off the North Foreland, Kent. Her crew were rescued by a smack.
Pearl	United Kingdom	The schooner was driven ashore at Dungeness, Kent. She was on a voyage from London to Cork. She was refloated and resumed her voyage.
Prinz Friedrich Karl	Germany	The steamship collided with a floating wreck at the mouth of the Mississippi River and was beached. She was on a voyage from Sunderland, County Durham, United Kingdom to New Orleans, Louisiana, United States.

== 11 July ==
List of shipwrecks: 11 July 1880
Ship	State	Description
Glowworm	United Kingdom	The steam launch ran aground on "Borongan Island", British Burma. She was refloated.
HMS Wye	Royal Navy	The store ship ran aground on the Nore. She was on a voyage from Malta to Woolwich, Kent. She was refloated with assistance from the tug Sampson (United Kingdom).

== 12 July ==
List of shipwrecks: 12 July 1880
Ship	State	Description
Suppicich	United Kingdom	The steamship caught fire at Malta.

== 13 July ==
List of shipwrecks: 13 July 1880
Ship	State	Description
Duke of Lancaster	United Kingdom	The steamship struck a rock and sank in the Red Sea off Jabal Zuqar. All on board were rescued by Australia (United Kingdom). Duke of Lancaster was on a voyage from Calcutta, India to London.

== 14 July ==
List of shipwrecks: 14 July 1880
Ship	State	Description
Casel Kercim	(Ottoman Empire) Egypt	The barque collided with the steamship Coronet (United Kingdom) and foundered in the Mediterranean Sea. All on board were rescued.
Flirt	United Kingdom	The yacht was driven ashore at Portobello, Lothian. She was refloated the next day and taken in to Leith, Lothian.
Vigilant	United Kingdom	The ship was wrecked on Brigg's Reef, off the coast of County Antrim. She was on a voyage from Dromore, County Down to Belfast, County Antrim.
Winchester	United Kingdom	The full-rigged ship was wrecked in the Strait of Macassar (2°58′S 117°34′E). Her crew were rescued. She was on a voyage from Manila, Spanish East Indies to Montreal, Quebec, Canada.

== 15 July ==
List of shipwrecks: 15 July 1880
Ship	State	Description
Antonio	Italy	The barque ran aground on the English Bank, in the River Plate. She was on a voyage from Cádiz, Spain to the River Plate. She was refloated with the assistance of a tug.
Dundee	United Kingdom	The barque was destroyed by fire at sea. Her 22 crew took to two boats; nine of them in one of the boats were rescued by Pfeil (Germany). The other boat reached Rio de Janeiro, Brazil. Dundee was on a voyage from Dundee, Forfarshire to Bombay, India.

== 16 July ==
List of shipwrecks: 16 July 1880
Ship	State	Description
Lostock	Norway	The steamship collided with the steamship Santorin (United Kingdom) and sank off Skagen, Denmark. Her crew were rescued by Santorin. Lostock was on a voyage from Bergen to Stockholm, Sweden.
Luna Nueva	Spain	The barque was struck by lightning and set on fire in the English Channel 14 nautical miles (26 km) south of Beachy Head, Sussex, United Kingdom. All eleven people on board and the ship's dog were rescued by a steamship. Luna Nueva was on a voyage from Antwerp, Belgium to Havana, Cuba. She was towed to Seaford, Sussex by the tug Victor (United Kingdom) and beached. She burnt out and was a total loss.

== 17 July ==
List of shipwrecks: 17 July 1880
Ship	State	Description
Aurora	United Kingdom	The steamship ran aground on the Pennington Spit, off the Isle of Wight. She was on a voyage from Porto, Portugal to Southampton, Hampshire.
Caroline	United Kingdom	The steamship was driven ashore on Fidra, Lothian. She was on a voyage from Grangemouth, Stirlingshire to London. She was refloated on 24 July and taken in to Leith, Lothian.
Helene	United Kingdom	The schooner ran aground at Wells-next-the-Sea, Norfolk.
Hydaspes	United Kingdom	The barque collided with the steamship Centurion (United Kingdom) and sank in the English Channel 5 nautical miles (9.3 km) off Dungeness, Kent. All 85 people on board were rescued by Centurion and the tug Napoleon (United Kingdom). Hydaspes was on a voyage from London to Melbourne, Victoria.
Royal Adelaide	United Kingdom	The schooner was driven ashore at New Romney, Kent. She was on a voyage from London to Swansea, Glamorgan. She was refloated the next day and resumed her voyage.
Scheldt	Belgium	The barque was destroyed by fire 19 nautical miles (35 km) south of St Catherine's Point, Isle of Wight. Her nineteen crew were rescued by the steamship Maria (United Kingdom). Scheldt was on a voyage from Antwerp to Hong Kong.
Siam	South Australia	The steamship ran aground at Albany, Western Australia. She was refloated.

== 18 July ==
List of shipwrecks: 18 July 1880
Ship	State	Description
Amelia	United Kingdom	The ship ran aground. She was on a voyage from Grimsby, Lincolnshire to Kronstadt, Russia. She was refloated and assisted in to Malmö, Sweden.
Confidence	United Kingdom	The ship sprang a leak and foundered between the Tuskar Rock and The Smalls, Cornwall. Her crew survived. She was on a voyage from Portmadoc, Caernarfonshire to Tralee, County Kerry.
Joshua and Mary	United Kingdom	The schooner collided with the barque Inch Marnock (United Kingdom) and sank in Tor Bay. Her crew were rescued by the smack Viga (United Kingdom). Joshua and Mary was on a voyage from South Shields, County Durham to Málaga, Spain.
Marie	France	The steamship was driven ashore west of Dunkirk, Nord. She was on a voyage from Saint Petersburg, Russia to Dunkirk.

== 19 July ==
List of shipwrecks: 19 July 1880
Ship	State	Description
Berrington	United Kingdom	The steamship ran aground on the Oosterbank, in the North Sea off the Dutch coast. She was refloated.
Black Sea	United Kingdom	The steamship ran aground in the Nieuw Diep. She was on a voyage from Kronstadt, Russia to Rotterdam, South Holland, Netherlands. She was refloated and towed in to Maassluis, South Holland.
Isabella Sinclair	United Kingdom	The fishing boat was run into and sunk off Peterhead, Aberdeenshire by the fishing boat Stork (United Kingdom).
Red Rose	United Kingdom	The steamship ran aground on the Haisborough Sands, in the North Sea off the coast of Norfolk. She was on her maiden voyage, from South Shields, County Durham to Alexandria, Egypt. She was refloated and put back to South Shield

== 20 July ==
List of shipwrecks: 20 July 1880
Ship	State	Description
Pelotas	United Kingdom	The schooner collided with the schoone Alexander Nicol (United Kingdom) and sank in the North Sea off Flamborough Head, Yorkshire.
St. Oswyn	United Kingdom	A donkey engine on the steamship suffered a boiler explosion, killing three of her crew and severely injuring fourteen people.

== 21 July ==
List of shipwrecks: 21 July 1880
Ship	State	Description
Benayo	United Kingdom	The ship struck a sunken rock 1 nautical mile (1.9 km) off Pomaron, Portugal and became waterlogged. She was on a voyage from to an English port.
Lilla	United Kingdom	The ship was wrecked in the Sir Edward Pellew Group of Islands, Queensland. Shew as on a voyage from London to Batavia, Netherlands East Indies and Yap, Caroline Islands.
Mahratta	United Kingdom	The steamship ran aground at the mouth of the Chittagong River whilst going to the assistance of a brig, which had also run aground. She was on a voyage from Buram to Calcutta, India. She was later refloated and taken in to Calcutta for repairs.
Psyche	United Kingdom	The ship capsized at Le Tréport, Seine-Inférieure, France. She was on a voyage from Briton Ferry, Glamorgan to Le Tréport.
Unnamed	Flag unknown	A brig ran aground at the mouth of the Chittagong River.

== 22 July ==
List of shipwrecks: 22 July 1880
Ship	State	Description
Canute	United Kingdom	The steamship ran aground off Goeree, Zeeland, Netherlands. She was on a voyage from Galaţi, United Principalities to Rotterdam, South Holland, Netherlands. She was reflaoted with assistance.
Countess of Devon	United Kingdom	The ship arrived at Demerara, British Guiana on fire. She was on a voyage from Troon, Ayrshire to Demerara.
Emma	United Kingdom	The brig ran around off Goeree. She was on a voyage from Lisbon, Portugal to Vlaardingen, South Holland. She subsequently became a wreck. Her crew were rescued.
Nenry	United Kingdom	The schooner was abandoned off the Kent coast. She was on a voyage from Pevensey, Sussex to Hartlepool, County Durham. She was subsequently taken in to Ramsgate, Kent.
Mamie	United States	The steam yacht collided with the steamship Garland (United States) in the Detroit River, 9 miles (14 km) downstream of Detroit, Michigan. Mamie was cut in two and of the 24 people on board, sixteen were drowned.
Pallion Lamb	United Kingdom	The ship ran aground on the West Bank. She was on a voyage from Maassluis, South Holland to Seaham, County Durham. She was refloated with the assistance of a tug.
Zennia	United Kingdom	The barque was driven ashore and wrecked at Port Natal, Natal Colony.

== 23 July ==
List of shipwrecks: 23 July 1880
Ship	State	Description
Catherina	Germany	The ship departed from Chiltepec for a British or European port. No further trace, reported missing.
Chamois	United Kingdom	The steamship ran aground at Schulau, Germany.
Midlothian	United Kingdom	The steamship ran aground on Alderney, Channel Islands. She was on a voyage from Cardiff, Glamorgan to Havre de Grâce, Seine-Inférieure, France. She was refloated and completed her voyage.
Stewart Freeman	Canada	The full-rigged ship rang aground at "Passage". She was on a voyage from Philadelphia, Pennsylvania, United States to Waterford, United Kingdom. She was refloated and taken in to Passage.

== 25 July ==
List of shipwrecks: 25 July 1880
Ship	State	Description
Frances	United Kingdom	The schooner sprang a leak and foundered in the North Sea 7 nautical miles (13 km) off Coquet Island, Northumberland. Her crew were rescued by the steamship Glasgow (United Kingdom). Frances was on a voyage from Hull, Yorkshire to Newton, Fife.
Hazeldean Hall	United Kingdom	The steamship collided with the steamship Terlings and sank in the English Channel 30 nautical miles (56 km) south of Portland, Dorset with the loss of five of her fourteen crew. Hazeldean Hall was on a voyage from Bilbao, Spain to the River Tyne.
Natal	United Kingdom	The ship ran aground at Durban, Colony of Natal. SHe was on a voyage from London to Durban. She was refloated and taken in to Durban.
Neptune	Switzerland	The steam yacht capsized and sank in the Bielersee with the loss of sixteen of the seventeen people on board.
Quail	United Kingdom	The steamship ran aground at Portpatrick, Wigtownshire. She was on a voyage from Antwerp, Belgium to Glasgow, Renfrewshire. She was refloated and resumed her voyage in a severely leaky condition.

== 26 July ==
List of shipwrecks: 26 July 1880
Ship	State	Description
Annie	United Kingdom	The ship departed from Quittah, Ashanti Empire for Rotterdam, South Holland, Netherlands. No further trace, reported missing.
Lizzie Perry	United Kingdom	The ship was driven ashore on Crane Island. She was on a voyage from Quebec City, Canada to Dublin. She was refloated and put back to Quebec City in a severely leaky condition.
Joseph Celestin	France	The schooner ran aground on the Pierre-à-l'Oeuil Bank and sank. Her crew were rescued. She was on a voyage from Nantes, Loire-Inférieure to Cardiff, Glamorgan, United Kingdom.
Norman Macleod	United Kingdom	The barque ran aground at Chittagong, India. She was on a voyage from Liverpool, Lancashire to Chittagong. She was refloated with assistance from the steamship Mahratta (United Kingdom).
Trio	Austria-Hungary	The brig collided with the steamship Tarifa (United Kingdom) and sank in the Mediterranean Sea. Her crew were rescued by Tarifa. Trio was on a voyage from Panderma, Ottoman Empire to Havre de Grâce, Seine-Inférieure.

== 27 July ==
List of shipwrecks: 27 July 1880
Ship	State	Description
Cosmopolita	Germany	The ship departed from Frontera de Tabasco, Mexico for Hamburg. No further trace, reported overdue.
Dunkeld	United Kingdom	The steamship ran aground at Port Natal, Natal Colony. She was refloated.
Kashgar	United Kingdom	The steamship struck the pier at Port Said, Egypt and was severely damaged at the bow. She was on a voyage from London to Bombay, India.
Quail	United Kingdom	The steamship was beached on Ailsa Craig. Quail was refloated the next day and taken in to Greenock, Renfrewshire.

== 28 July ==
List of shipwrecks: 28 July 1880
Ship	State	Description
Catherina	Germany	The ship departed from San José Chiltepec, Mexico for a European port. No further trace, reported missing.
United Kingdom	United Kingdom	The tug was run into by the barque Hestia at Barrow-in-Furness, Lancashire and was severely damaged.
Unnamed	United Kingdom	A fishing boat ran aground on the East Hoyle Bank, in Liverpool Bay.

== 29 July ==
List of shipwrecks: 29 July 1880
Ship	State	Description
Amaryllis	United Kingdom	The steamship ran aground at Blankenese, Germany.
Duke of Devonshire	United Kingdom	The steamship ran aground at Kedgeree, India. She was on a voyage from Calcutta, India to London. She was refloated the next day and resumed her voyage.
Prescious	Norway	The ship was driven ashore and wrecked in Sinclairs Bay. All eight people on board were rescued. She was on a voyage from Laurvig to Belfast, County Antrim, United Kingdom.

== 30 July ==
List of shipwrecks: 30 July 1880
Ship	State	Description
Blanche	United Kingdom	The ship collided with the steamship Escurial (United Kingdom) and sank off Cape Trafalgar, Spain. Her crew were rescued. Blanche was on a voyage from Hammerfest, Norway to Genoa, Italy.
Cleveland	United States	The tug burned to the water's edge off in Lake Huron Charity Island, Michigan.
Iron Duke	Royal Navy	The Audacious-class ironclad ran aground off Hokkaido, Japan. She was refloated on 1 August; subsequently repaired at Hong Kong.
Providence	United Kingdom	The ketch was run down by the steamship Alexandra (United Kingdom) and sank off Ryde, Isle of Wight. Providence was on a voyage from Poole, Dorset to London.

== 31 July ==
List of shipwrecks: 31 July 1879
Ship	State	Description
Champlain	French Navy	The ship ran aground off Hokkaido, Japan whilst going to the assistance of HMS Iron Duke (Royal Navy). She was refloated and towed in to Nagasaki by Kerguelin (French Navy) for repairs.
Nadine	Imperial Russian Navy	The torpedo boat was driven ashore and wrecked at Aracati, Brazil. Her crew were rescued. She was on a voyage from London, United Kingdom to Rio de Janeiro, Brazil.

== Unknown date ==
List of shipwrecks: Unknown date in July 1879
Ship	State	Description
Agnes	United Kingdom	The schooner was wrecked on the Minquiers, off Jersey, Channel Islands. She was on a voyage from Granville, Manche to "Heven".
Alpha	Norway	The barque was driven ashore at Rauma, Grand Duchy of Finland. She was on a voyage from Rauma to Antwerp, Belgium. She was refloated and resumed her voyage, but put in to Copenhagen, Denmark in a leaky condition.
Antonio	Italy	The barque ran aground on the English Bank, in the River Plate.
Argus	United Kingdom	The ship ran aground at Cárdenas, Cuba. She was on a voyage from Cárdenas to Philadelphia, Pennsylvania, United States. She was refloated and put back to Cárdenas.
SMS Barbarossa	Imperial German Navy	The barracks ship was sunk as a target.
Bernardo	United Kingdom	The barque ran aground on the Long Acre Reef, off Luana Point, Jamaica. She was consequently condemned.
Bertolotto Savona	Italy	The barque collided with the schooner William L. Abbott (United States) and ran aground at Chatham, Massachusetts, United States. She was on a voyage from Trapani, Sicily to Boston, Massachusetts. She was later refloated and taken in to Boston.
Birnam Wood	Canada	The ship was driven ashore at the mouth of the Schuylkill River. She was on a voyage from Antwerp, Belgium to Philadelphia, Pennsylvania.
Bolette	Denmark	The brig ran aground at Langelande. She was refloated and taken in to Kiel, Germany in a leaky condition.
Carrie Humphrey	United Kingdom	The ship ran aground on the Abo Shoal, off the coast of Cuba before 9 July and was abandoned.
Delmira	Portugal	The barque struck a rock off Bragança, Brazil and sank. Her crew were rescued.
Edmonton	United Kingdom	The steamship was wrecked on the Gingerbread Reef, in the Bahamas. She was on a voyage from Cardiff, Glamorgan to Havana, Cuba.
Eldorado	United States	The ship was wrecked in the Strait of Juan de Fuca. She was on a voyage from Seattle, Washington Territory, to San Francisco, California.
Emma	United Kingdom	The ship was driven ashore and wrecked on Goeree, Zeeland, Netherlands. Her crew were rescued.
Esperance	Netherlands	The ship was wrecked on the coast of Norway. She was on a voyage from Turku, Grand Duchy of Finland to Southampton, Hampshire, United Kingdom.
Express	Sweden	The schooner ran aground at Dragør, Denmark. She was refloated.
George and Elizabeth	United Kingdom	The dandy capsized and sank in the River Taff. She was on a voyage from Cardiff to Bideford, Devon.
Georgiana	Leeward Islands	The sloop was driven ashore at "Paulet", Martinique.
Hillechina Margrieta	Netherlands	The ship was taken in to Tönning Germany in a sinking condition with assistance from Good Intent (United Kingdom). Hillechina Margrieta was on a voyage from Dordrecht, South Holland to Königsberg, Germany.
Island Belle	United Kingdom	The ship was wrecked on the Bocas Reef. She was on a voyage from Trinidad to London.
Johanna Augusta	Norway	The barque ran aground on the Hittarp Reef, in the Baltic Sea. She was refloated.
Juliana	Norway	The schooner caught fire and was abandoned in the Baltic Sea. Her crew were rescued by the steamship Africa (Germany). Juliana was on a voyage from Wasa, Grand Duchy of Finland to Copenhagen, Denmark.
Kallisto	United Kingdom	The barque was wrecked south of Cape San Antonio, Cuba. Her crew were rescued. She was on a voyage from Manzanilla, Trinidad to Liverpool, Lancashire, United Kingdom.
Margarethe	Germany	The barque ran aground on the West Hoyle Bank, in Liverpool Bay. She was on a voyage from Darien, Georgia, United States to Liverpool. She subsequently broke her back and became a wreck.
Marquis of Lorne	United Kingdom	The barque capsized at Philadelphia, Pennsylvania, United States.
Mary A. Kersten	United States	The brig ran aground on the Red Sand, in the Thames Estuary. She was refloated with the assistance of a tug and taken in to Sheerness, Kent, United Kingdom.
Mauritania	United Kingdom	The steamship ran aground in the Sulina branch of the Danube at Gorgova, United Principalities. She was on a voyage from Galaţi, United Principalities to Liverpool. She was refloated on 31 July and resumed her voyage.
Noel de la Morinière	France	The fishing lugger was driven ashore at Sea Palling, Norfolk, United Kingdom. She was refloated and taken in to Great Yarmouth, Norfolk.
Pioneer	United Kingdom	The brig was driven ashore at Ossby, Öland, Sweden. She was later refloated and taken in to Stockholm, Sweden.
Polino	United Kingdom	The ship ran aground in the Saint Lawrence River. She was on a voyage from Pictou, Nova Scotia to Montreal, Quebec, Canada.
Poolscar	United Kingdom	The barque was wrecked at Holm, Orkney Islands.
Pricoria	Norway	The ship was driven ashore and wrecked in Sinclairs Bay. Her crew were rescued.
R. C. Wylie	Kingdom of Hawaii	The barque was destroyed by fire at sea. Her crew were rescued.
Rose	United Kingdom	The schooner ran aground on the Black Rock Ledge, off the Isle of Wight. She was on a voyage from Hull, Yorkshire to Plymouth, Devon. She was refloated and taken in to Yarmouth, Isle of Wight.
Seawauhaka	United States	The steamship was destroyed by fire off Randall's Island, New York with the loss of more than 32 lives. She was on a voyage from New York City to Glen Cove, New York.
Selina	United Kingdom	The ship was driven ashore and wrecked on Anticosti Island, Nova Scotia, Canada. Her crew were rescued. She was on a voyage from Quebec City, Canada to Bristol, Gloucestershire.
Suppicich	United Kingdom	The steamship was damaged by fire whilst on a voyage from London to Malta. The fire was extinguished.
Tomasi di Savoia	Italy	The ship ran aground at Gloucester, Massachusetts. She was later refloated.
Triscoria	Norway	The ship was driven ashore and wrecked near Keiss, Sutherland, United Kingdom. Her crew were rescued.
Whitehall	United Kingdom	The barque was abandoned off Dassen Island, Cape Colony. She was on a voyage from Newport to Cape Town, Cape Colony. She was subsequently towed into Cape Town by the steamship Protos (Germany).
759	Russia	The lighter collided with the lighter 298 and sank at Kronstadt.
