= Lord Pentland =

Lord Pentland may refer to:

- Baron Pentland, a hereditary peerage created in 1909
  - John Sinclair, 1st Baron Pentland (1860–1925), Scottish politician
  - Henry Sinclair, 2nd Baron Pentland (1907–1984), president of the Gurdjieff Foundation in America
- Paul Cullen, Lord Pentland (born 1957), Scottish judge and former politician
