= Bucholly Castle =

Historic castle in Caithness, Scotland

- Freswick, Caithness in Scotland
- Front view of Bucholly Castle.

Site information
- Type: Promontory castle, medieval keep
- Owner: Unconfirmed (Note: Robin Sinclair, 2nd Viscount Thurso is listed as the owner of Bucholly Castle in the Caithness Coastal Survey 1980–82: Dunnet Head to Ousdale. Following his death in 1995, his estate devolved to his son, John Archibald Sinclair, 3rd Viscount Thurso, as recorded in a 2021 decision of the Scottish Land Court. The present ownership of the castle has not been independently confirmed.)
- Open to the public: Yes
- Condition: Ruined

Location
- Coordinates: 58°34′33.7″N 3°03′51.2″W

Site history
- Built: 15th century (possibly on the site of a 12th-century fortress)
- Built by: Mowats of Balquholly
- Materials: Flagstone, Lime mortar

Scheduled monument
- Official name: Bucholly Castle
- Type: Secular castle
- Designated: 17 February 1938
- Reference no.: SM620

Bucholly Castle (Note: This is the locally accepted spelling as described and planned by previous authorities.) (alternatively spelled Buchollie Castle or Bucholie), historically known as Freswick Castle, (Note: Not to be confused with Freswick Castle, a 17th-century tower house located further up the coast, which overlooks Freswick Bay.) is a historic ruined castle near Freswick, Caithness in Scotland.

The castle has been suggested as the former site of Lambaborg, a 12th-century fortress associated with Sweyn Asleifsson, a Viking featured in the Orkneyinga saga. According to the saga, Sweyn fortified himself there and, during a siege, escaped by being lowered into the sea by rope before swimming along the coast to safety.

The present structure dates from the 15th century and was built by the Mowats of Balquholly, (Note: Also called 'Mowats of Freswick'. John Mowat (1935–46) referenced this issue: "The [Mowats] are so often styled sometimes of Balquhollie, sometimes of Buchollie and Freswick and sometimes of Freswick only that it is a problem for the most expert genealogist.") from whom the castle derives its name. It was sold in 1661 and eventually fell out of use.

Bucholly Castle is a scheduled monument and has been described as "one of the most interesting ancient buildings in the county".

== History ==
=== Early history ===
The castle viewed from the west, showing the shore and cliff edges.

The site of Bucholly Castle has been suggested as the location of the 12th-century fortress of Lambaborg. In The Orkneyinga Saga, Lambaborg is the fortress in which Sweyn Asleifson fortified himself: he had raided local settlements, causing havoc and anger among the locals, including Earl Rögnvald.

(Swein) [...] gathered men together, and went to Lambaborg, where he fortified himself. It was a strong place, and there he remained, with sixty men, and brought thither provisions and other necessaries. The borg (castle) was situated on a sea-girt rock, and on the landward side there was a well-built stone wall. The crags ran a long way along the sea on either side. Swein and his men committed many violent robberies in Caithness, and brought everything into the stronghold, and became greatly hated.

The Earl Rögnvald eventually laid siege to Lambaborg, attempting to starve out Sweyn and his men.

... then he tied together ropes which they had, and during the night they let Swein and Margad down from the borg into the sea. They swam along the cliffs till they came to the end of them, then they got on shore and went to Sutherland, thence to Moray, and then to Dúfeyrar.

Bucholly Castle continues to be strongly associated with Sweyn Asleifsson and his exploits, partly because the site resembles the fortress described in the Orkneyinga Saga. However, although Bucholly Castle is often identified as the site of Lambaborg, or reported to have previously borne that name, the evidence is circumstantial, and the exact location of Lambaborg remains unknown.

Colleen E. Batey (1987) suggested that Bucholly Castle's supposed connection with the Orkneyinga Saga was reinforced by the Royal Commission on the Ancient and Historical Monuments and Constructions of Scotland (RCAHMS) in its 1911 report on the site. Likewise, she argued that the idea itself may have originated from Thomas Pennant, the 18th-century Welsh traveller who wrote about his visit to the castle in A Tour in Scotland (1771).

Historically, Bucholly Castle has been called 'Freswick Castle' or 'Old Freswick Castle'. R.G. Lamb (1980) notes that the former name 'Freswick Castle' gives a strong indication of a high-status establishment at Freswick during Norse times and suggests this is reinforced by Sweyn Asleifsson's family's historical association with Freswick. While it is possible that Bucholly Castle "overlies or incorporates elements of an earlier structure", there is no part of the surviving remains that is known to predate the 15th century. Today, Freswick Castle is the name of a 17th-century tower house further up the coast overlooking Freswick Bay.

=== Later history ===
The present structure was built in the 15th century by the Mowats of Balquholly, a family originating in Aberdeenshire, who were granted the lands of Freswick by King Robert the Bruce, with the grant confirmed by charter of the Duke of Albany in 1406. As such, Bucholly Castle is the former residence of the Mowat family.

The name 'Bucholly' is thought to have been brought to Caithness by the Mowat family: Balquholly was the name of Hatton Castle in Aberdeenshire, the former seat of the Mowat family. However, it does not appear that the lands of Caithness, forming the modern estate of Freswick, went by the name of Bucholly.

In 1661, the Mowat family sold the lands of Freswick and the castle to William Sinclair of Rattar, grandson of Sir John of Greenland and a member of a cadet branch of Clan Sinclair. The castle eventually fell out of use. It has been suggested that the castle was abandoned by the Mowat family at the beginning of the 17th century in favour of the tower house Freswick Castle. (Note: Martin Coventry (1997) refers to the tower house as 'Freswick House'.)

== Description ==
The castle, seen from the north, showing its position on the promontory and the surviving gatehouse.

Bucholly Castle's "considerable and picturesque ruins" consist of a gatehouse – its principal feature, containing considerable architectural detail – of which only the west and south walls survive. The gatehouse is relatively small and features primitive masonry, while its passage leading to the courtyard is characteristic of 15th-century architecture. The entrance passage and the room to its south, a guardroom, occupy the lowest storey, and both have vaulted ceilings. The intermediate floor above the vaulted spaces was constructed using timber joists.

The castle itself sits on a promontory, accessible by a narrow isthmus that leads towards the gatehouse; a defensive drawbridge would have provided access to the castle. Thomas Pennant wrote of the castle, then known as Freswick Castle, during his visit to Scotland in 1769:

Freſwick caſtle is ſeated on a narrow rock projecting into the ſea, with juſt room enough for it to ſtand on: the acceſs to it while the draw-bridge was in being, was over a deep chaſm cut thro’ the little iſthmus that connected it to the main land. Theſe dreadfull ſituations are ſtrongly expreſſive of the jealous and wretched condition of the tyrant owners.

Corbelling is observed above the second-floor level, indicating that the gatehouse had a projecting battlement. A sketch in The Castellated and Domestic Architecture of Scotland from the Twelfth to the Eighteenth Century (1887) clearly portrays the battlement above the gatehouse, as well as a third window aperture that is no longer present. Beyond the entrance, a narrow courtyard is flanked by the remains of buildings. The remains on the western side are thought to have had a central hall over an unvaulted basement. Evidence of external stairs leading to an upper floor is visible in the courtyard, while an extensive kitchen midden is recorded along the cliff-top on the seaward side.

Plans of Bucholly Castle (Note: Mike Salter (1995) also provides a plan of the castle showing the location of its central hall.)
A plan of Bucholly Castle's keep from MacGibbon and Ross's The Castellated and Domestic Architecture of Scotland from the Twelfth to the Eighteenth Century (1887).

Ground plan of Bucholly Castle from Third Report and Inventory of Monuments and Constructions in the County of Caithness (1911) by RCAHMS.

== Current status ==
Bucholly Castle showing the gatehouse from within its courtyard. It is the last surviving structure to retain considerable architectural detail.

As a scheduled monument, it is legally protected from unauthorised works without prior written consent. A 2016 amendment to its designation brought the accompanying documentation up to modern standards. The report noted that, while the site was in a "reasonably stable condition", coastal erosion continued to threaten it.

Erosion of the site had previously been reported in a 1984 survey of the castle. The survey described the erosion as "extreme on all sides" with "severe active erosion in the form of substantial cracking of the superstructure". Adrian Pettifer (2024) described the remains of the castle as "scant and destined to become scantier" in light of its continued deterioration.

Historic Environment Scotland (HES) states that Bucholly Castle is of "national importance" as it provides an essential "understanding of the past, in particular of late medieval society in northern Scotland and the date, construction, use and development of castles." Furthermore, HES states that "the loss or damage of the monument would diminish our ability to appreciate and understand the character of late medieval fortifications, and the structure and organisation of society and economy during this period."

Access to the castle is highly dangerous, and caution is advised when approaching the castle. Its narrow access point, sheer drops on either side and uneven ground beneath the main entrance to the gatehouse make entering the castle hazardous. Martin Coventry (1997) declared the castle to be in a "dangerous state, and should be approached — if at all — with great care".

== Archaeology ==
Seven small fragments of brownish unglazed pottery from a refuse heap at Bucholly Castle were donated to the National Museum of Antiquities of Scotland (NMAS), now the National Museum of Scotland, by Alex. O. Curle in 1911. Further pottery has been recovered, including a fine, ribbed strap handle of grass-tempered pottery. The extensive midden deposit measuring 2 x 40 metres was traced, sampled and recorded in the Caithness Coastal Survey 1980–82: Dunnet Head to Ousdale (1984). (Note: A picture of the midden deposit after sampling is recorded under 'PLATE 2A, B' which can be found towards the end of the text.)

== Gallery ==
Bucholly Castle viewed from across the surrounding landscape.

Bucholly Castle, showing the promontory, sea and cliff edges.

Bucholly Castle viewed from a distance, showing the left side of the gatehouse.

Bucholly Castle gatehouse, viewed from the front.

Bucholly Castle, showing the right side of the promontory and its cliff edges.

Bucholly Castle, viewed westwards from the courtyard, showing the remains of the gatehouse.

Bucholly Castle, viewed north-eastwards, showing the turf-covered walls and sea.

Bucholly Castle, viewed westwards, showing a close-up of the gatehouse and passage.

Bucholly Castle, viewed from the courtyard entrance, showing the east wall.

Bucholly Castle, viewed southwards from inside the gatehouse, showing the southern wall and western wall above the cliff edge.

== Literature ==
- James T. Calder wrote a poem titled 'Lines Written on Visit to Bucholie Castle' in his book The Soldier's Bride, and Other Poems (1846).
- John Anderton Naylor and Robert Anderton Naylor document their visit to Bucholly Castle during their 1,372-mile walk, From John O'Groat's to Land's End (1916).
- A Bistorta vivipara (Note: Author uses the name Polygonum viviparum.) is described as having been found by the Caithness Field Club growing on a cliff near Bucholly Castle, in The Vegetation of Caithness Considered in Relation to the Geology (1911).
- Bucholly Castle is mentioned alongside Castle Sinclair Girnigoe and Keiss Castle in The History Behind Game of Thrones: The North Remembers (2019) as real-world examples of castles matching the description of Castle Pyke in Game of Thrones.

== See also ==
- Castles in Scotland
- List of castles in Scotland
- List of castles in Highland (Scotland)
- Castles in Great Britain and Ireland
