= Hatton Castle =

Hatton Castle may refer to:

- Hatton Castle, Aberdeenshire
- Hatton Castle, Angus
