= Alexander Sinclair, 9th Earl of Caithness =

18th-century Scottish nobleman

Alexander Sinclair, 9th Earl of Caithness (died 1765) was a Scottish nobleman, Earl of Caithness and chief of the Clan Sinclair, a Highland Scottish clan in Caithness.

== Biography ==
Alexander Sinclair, 9th Earl of Caithness was the eldest son of John Sinclair, 8th Earl of Caithness (d. 1705). He married Lady Margaret Primrose, daughter of the Earl of Rosebery. He died in 1765, leaving an only child, Lady Dorothea, who married James Duff, 2nd Earl Fife and who died in 1819 without issue.

In 1761, Alexander Sinclair, 9th Earl of Caithness had executed an entail that on the failure of his heirs, his estates should pass to the Sinclairs of Stevenson who were not related to the Sinclairs of Murkle who the Earl was descended from. He had resided at Haimer Castle, which after his death fell into disrepair. Upon his death the male issue of his father, John Sinclair, 8th Earl of Caithness, of his grandfather, Sir James Sinclair, 2nd of Murkle and of his great-grandfather, James Sinclair, 1st of Murkle, became extinct. The title then devolved upon William Sinclair of Rattar, as the lineal descendant of Sir John Sinclair of Greenland and Rattar, third son of John Sinclair, Master of Caithness (d. 1576) and younger brother of James Sinclair, 1st of Murkle. The Master of Caithness being the son of George Sinclair, 4th Earl of Caithness.

Sir James Sinclair of Murkle had a son, David Sinclair of Broynach, whose male descendants would have succeeded to the title in preferences to the Sinclair of Greenland and Rattar branch. However, his grandson, James, who did claim the title, failed to establish legitimacy of his father, David, the son of David Sinclair of Broynach. William Sinclair of Rattar was therefore served male heir, becoming 10th Earl of Caithness, with the Committee of Privileges adjudging the title to him in May 1772.

== See also ==
- Barony of Roslin
- Lord Sinclair
- Lord Herdmanston

Peerage of Scotland
Preceded by John Sinclair	Earl of Caithness; 1705–1765	Succeeded by William Sinclair
