= James Sinclair, 12th Earl of Caithness =

Scottish nobleman

- Earl
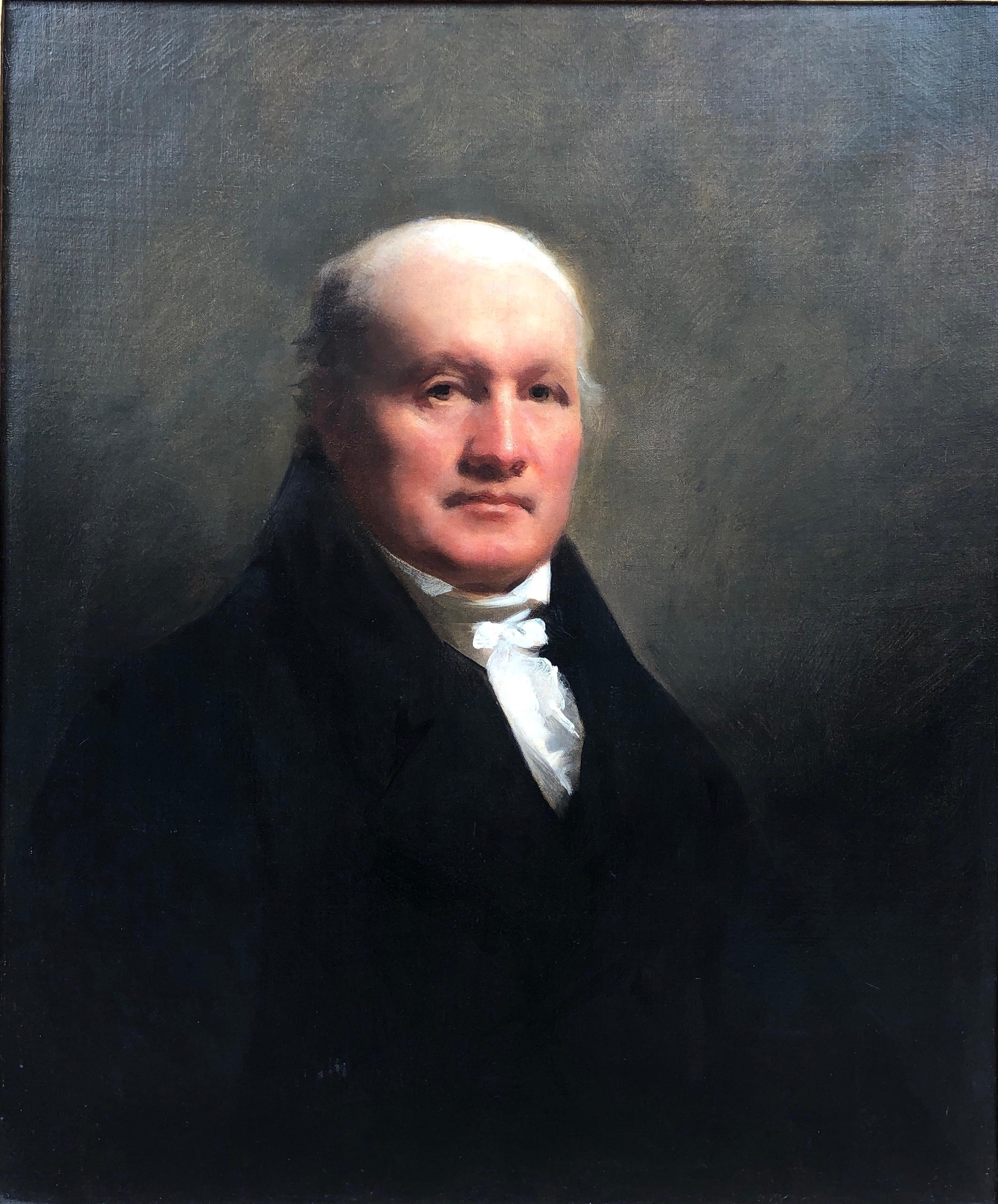
- portrait by Henry Raeburn

- Coat of arms
- Born: 31 October 1766; Castle of Mey
- Died: 16 July 1823; Castle of Mey
- Spouse(s): Jean Campbell
- Father: Sir John Sinclair of Mey, 6th Bt.
- Mother: Charlotte Sutherland

James Sinclair, 12th Earl of Caithness (1766–1823) was a Scottish noble, Earl of Caithness and chief of the Clan Sinclair, a Highland Scottish clan.

James Sinclair was born at Barrogill Castle (Castle of Mey) on 31 May 1766. He was the son of Sir John Sinclair of Mey, Baronet who he succeeded in the baronetcy in 1774. He succeeded as 12th earl of Caithness in 1789, as nearest lawful male heir of William Sinclair, 2nd Earl of Caithness. His claim to the peerage was sustained by the House of Lords.

He was the first to be appointed Lord Lieutenant of Caithness in 1794 and was commissioned as lieutenant-colonel of the Ross, Caithness, Sutherland and Cromarty Militia in 1802. He was also colonel of the three battalions of Caithness Volunteers formed in 1803, and later colonel-commandant of the Caithness Local Militia.

In 1811 he was appointed Deputy Postmaster General of Scotland in place of Francis Gray, 14th Lord Gray. Following his death on 16 July 1823 the post was filled by Sir David Wedderburn, 1st Baronet.

He married at Thurso Castle on 2 January 1784 Jane, second daughter of Alexander Campbell of Bareldine who was deputy governor of Fort George. They had the following children:

1. John Sinclair, Lord Berriedale who died in 1802 aged 14.
2. Alexander Sinclair, 13th Earl of Caithness.
3. Four other sons and three daughters.

== See also ==
- Barony of Roslin
- Lord Sinclair
- Lord Herdmanston

Peerage of Scotland
| Preceded by John Sinclair | Earl of Caithness; 1789–1823 | Succeeded by Alexander Sinclair |
Baronetage of Nova Scotia
| Preceded by John Sinclair | Baronet (of Canisbay); 1774–1823 | Succeeded by Alexander Sinclair |
