= William Sinclair, 10th Earl of Caithness =

Scottish nobleman

The Right Honourable William Sinclair
- Earl of Caithness
- Coat of arms
- Tenure: 1765–1779
- Predecessor: Alexander Sinclair, 9th Earl of Caithness
- Successor: John Sinclair, 11th Earl of Caithness
- Spouse: Barbara Sinclair
- Issue: John Sinclair, 11th Earl of Caithness; Hon. William Sinclair; Hon. James Sinclair; Hon. Alexander Sinclair; Hon. David Sinclair; Lady Isabella Sinclair; Lady Janet Sinclair

William Sinclair, 10th Earl of Caithness (died 1779), was a Scottish nobleman, Earl of Caithness and chief of the Clan Sinclair, a Highland Scottish clan in Caithness.

== Biography ==
In 1761, Alexander Sinclair, 9th Earl of Caithness had executed an entail that on the failure of his heirs, his estates should pass to the Sinclairs of Stevenson who were not related to the Sinclairs of Murkle who the Earl was descended from. Upon his death, the male issue of his father, John Sinclair, 8th Earl of Caithness, of his grandfather, Sir James Sinclair, 2nd of Murkle and of his great-grandfather, James Sinclair, 1st of Murkle, became extinct. The title then devolved upon William Sinclair of Rattar, as the lineal descendant of Sir John Sinclair of Greenland and Rattar, third son of John Sinclair, Master of Caithness (d. 1576) and younger brother of James Sinclair, 1st of Murkle. The Master of Caithness being the son of George Sinclair, 4th Earl of Caithness.

Sir James Sinclair of Murkle had a son, David Sinclair of Broynach, whose male descendants would have succeeded to the title in preferences to the Sinclair of Greenland and Rattar branch. However, his grandson, James, who did claim the title, failed to establish legitimacy of his father, David, the son of David Sinclair of Broynach. William Sinclair of Rattar was therefore served male heir, becoming 10th Earl of Caithness, with the Committee of Privileges adjudging the title to him in May 1772.

William Sinclair, 10th Earl of Caithness married Barbara, daughter of John Sinclair of Scotscalder. He died in 1779 leaving five sons and three daughters:

1. John Sinclair, 11th Earl of Caithness, heir and successor.
2. William Sinclair, an officer, who died in America, unmarried.
3. James Sinclair.
4. Alexander Sinclair.
5. David Sinclair.
6. Lady Isabella Sinclair, who died unmarried.
7. Lady Janet Sinclair, who married James Traill of Rattar.

== See also ==
- Barony of Roslin
- Lord Sinclair
- Lord Herdmanston

Peerage of Scotland
Preceded by Alexander Sinclair	Earl of Caithness; 1765–1779	Succeeded by John Sinclair
