= David Carment =

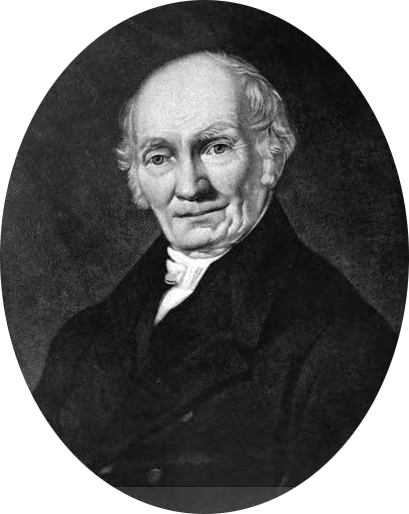
- David Carment from Gospel Worthies of the Highlands
- Church: Rosskeen

Personal details
- Born: 1772
- Died: 1856 (aged 83–84)

David Carment (1772–1856) was a minister of first the Church of Scotland and then the Free Church of Scotland, who was involved in the Disruption of 1843 and in the legal troubles of the aftermath regarding church property ownership.

== Life ==
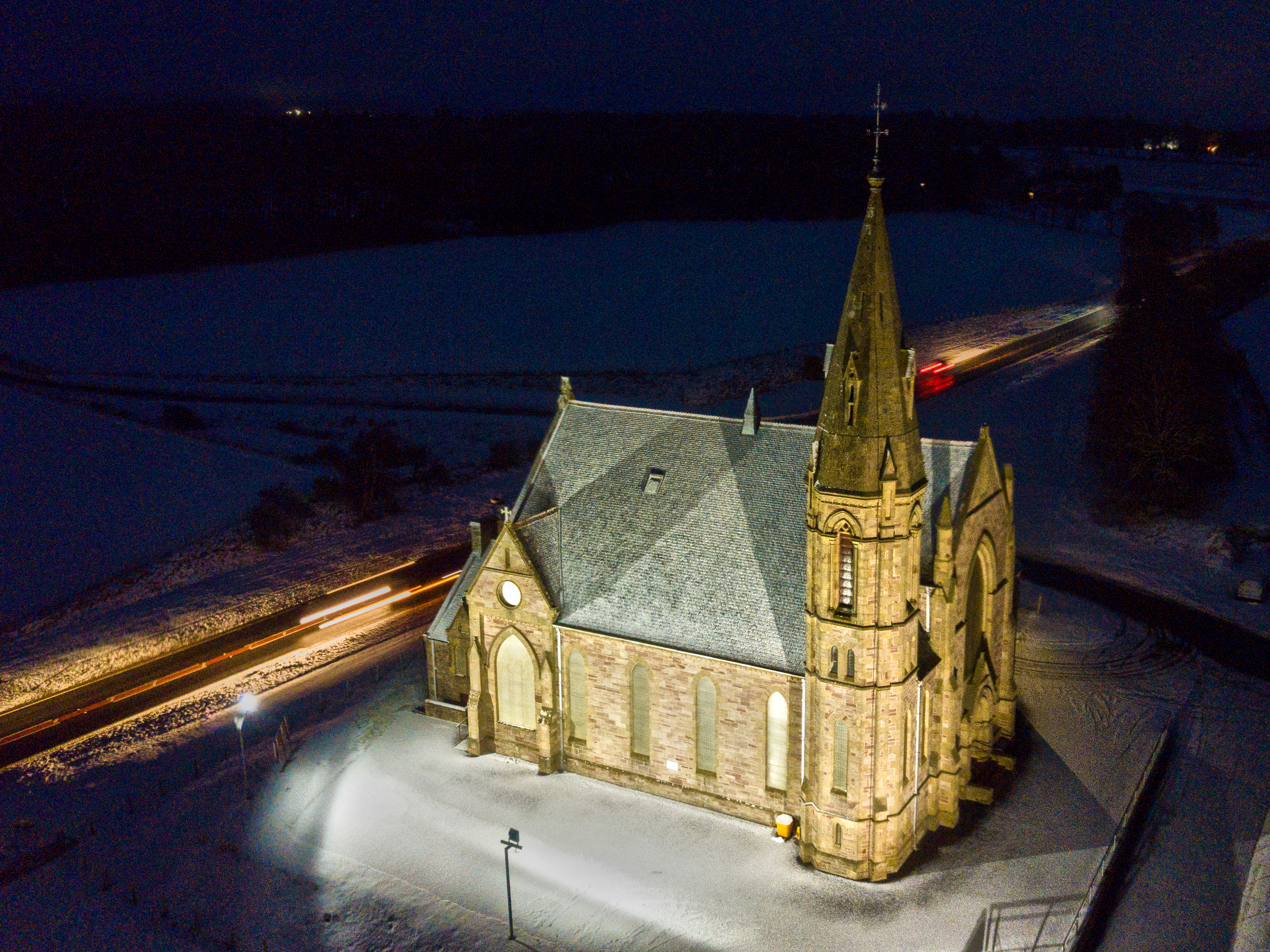
Rosskeen Free Church

He was born on 28 September 1772 at Keiss near Wick, the son of James Carment (d.1812) the local schoolteacher, and his wife, Elizabeth Dunnet. He was educated by his father His father was originally from Irongray, west of Dumfries. (Note: See Irongray railway station) The family had a strong Calvinist and Covenanting history. His father was baptised in the hills by John Welsh.

In 1785 Carment was sent to the school at Canisbay on the north coast of Aberdeenshire to learn Greek and Latin. In October 1789, at the age of 17, he took on the role of parish schoolmaster in Kincardine on a salary of £5 per year but with free board in a room in the manse. However, he left this in November 1791 when he took up further studies at King's College, Aberdeen. He supplemented his income, to pay for the course, by tutoring the family of George Munro (1743-1832) of South Uist in the summer months. During this period he learned Gaelic which served him well in later life. He graduated MA at Aberdeen in the spring of 1795. He then found a post as schoolmaster of Strath on the Isle of Skye where he remained for four years. He interspersed this with studies at Divinity Hall in Aberdeen and was licensed to preach by the Presbytery of Skye in April 1799.

He then moved to be private tutor to Mr MacDonald's family on Scalpay, a small island near Skye, a period he much enjoyed. (Note: The source gives the island's name as Scalpa [sic]. However, Scalpay is clearly described.) In March 1803 he became parochial assistant to Hugh Calder (1746-1822) in Croy, Inverness-shire, where services were in Gaelic.

In January 1810 he was chosen as minister of the new Gaelic Chapel on Duke Street in Glasgow. He was not yet licensed to preach, so after licensing by the Presbytery of Nairn he was ordained in April 1810. He gave two Gaelic services and one English service each Sunday. In March 1822 he translated to Rosskeen as assistant to the elderly (72) John Ross and succeeded him as minister on his death in 1824. Rosskeen was a large parish, encompassing three villages, with a total population of 2600 to serve. During his service he established four new parochial schools and organised with the Bible Society of Scotland the supply of one bible for each household in both English and Gaelic.

In 1825 he made an important speech to the General Assembly debating the constitution of the Church. In the same year his congregation happily paid for a large new manse to house Carnent and his family. In 1832 the congregation paid for a huge new church, seating 1600 persons, the largest church in northern Scotland, to accommodate the huge crowds who now flocked to hear Carment.

In the year prior to the Disruption of 1843 he was a vocal advocate of the split and in 1843 he left the established church, and together with a majority of the local congregation, set up Rosskeen Free Church. Indeed, with 2950 out of 3000 following him, Rosskeen was one of the largest Free Church congregations outwith the major cities. However, the transition cost him the use of the manse and the right to be buried in the churchyard with his children. He went to live in a much smaller house in Invergordon thereafter.

At the arrival of the new minister of the old parish church, John MacKenzie, Carment helped to quell the potential riot of his parishioners who were dismayed that the manse they had paid for was not given to their minister of choice. This example was one of the most important raised in the courts regarding the property rights of the Free Church as it exemplified that the law saw the building of a manse or church at the expense of the local parishioners as a gift to the church as an established body, and did not link to the parishioners who paid for it nor to the minister.

He died on 26 May 1856 and is buried in the churchyard at Rosskeen.

== Family ==
In May 1815 he married Margaret Stormonth (d.1874) daughter of James Stormonth of Airlie and granddaughter of Sir Alexander Wedderburn, 1st Earl of Rosslyn. Their children included:

- Rev James Carment (1816-1880), Free Church minister of Comrie, Perthshire
- John Carment LLD SSC (1817-1901), solicitor in Edinburgh
- David Carment (1819-1839)
- Isabella (1821-1835)
- Elizabeth (1823-1873)
- Samuel (1825-1834)
- Malcolm (1827-1842)
- Margaret (1830-1834)
- Joseph (born 1832)
- Jane (born 1834)

His wife went to live with John Carment in Edinburgh after David's death, and died at 36 Great King Street in October 1874.

== Published works ==
- The fiery cross: Or, a warning voice to the sons and daughters of Caledonia. Edinburgh: Johnstone and Fairly. 1843. [Pamphlet].
- The Two Parties in the Church Brought to the Test: Or, Moderatism and Evangelism Contrasted. Edinburgh: John Johnstone. 1843. OCLC 950976778. [1853 edition published, London: R. Groombridge].
- "Parish of Rosskeen - Presbytery of Tain, Synod of Ross". The New Statistical Account of Scotland, by the ministers of the respective parishes, under the superintendence of a committee of the Society for the Benefit of the Sons and Daughters of the Clergy. Vol. XIV–Inverness, Ross and Cromarty. Edinburgh: Blackwoods and Sons. pp. 262–279 – via The Statistical Accounts of Scotland.
