= Rosskeen =

Scottish parish in Highland, Scotland

Coordinates: 57°41′N 4°12′W

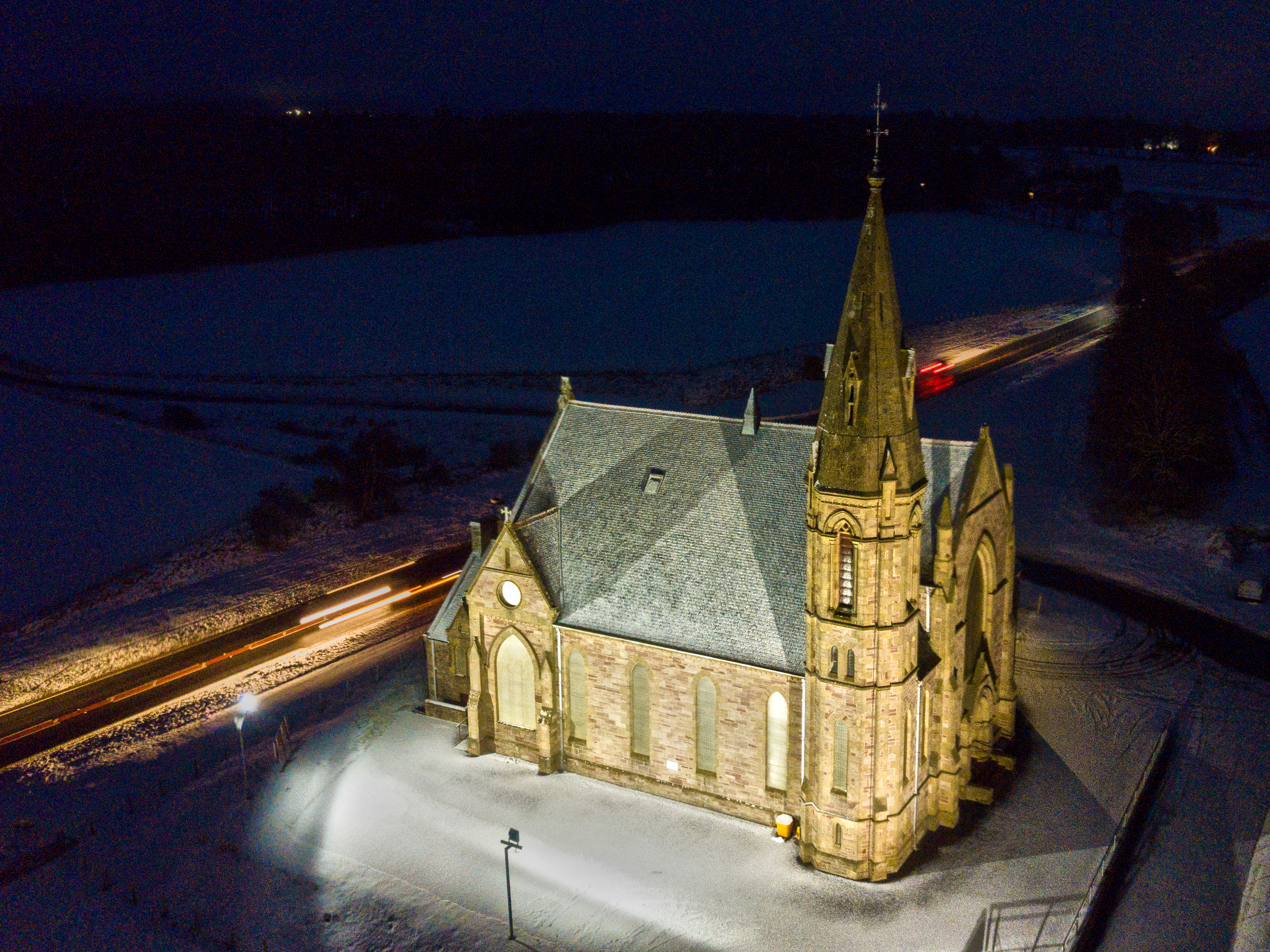
Rosskeen Free Church

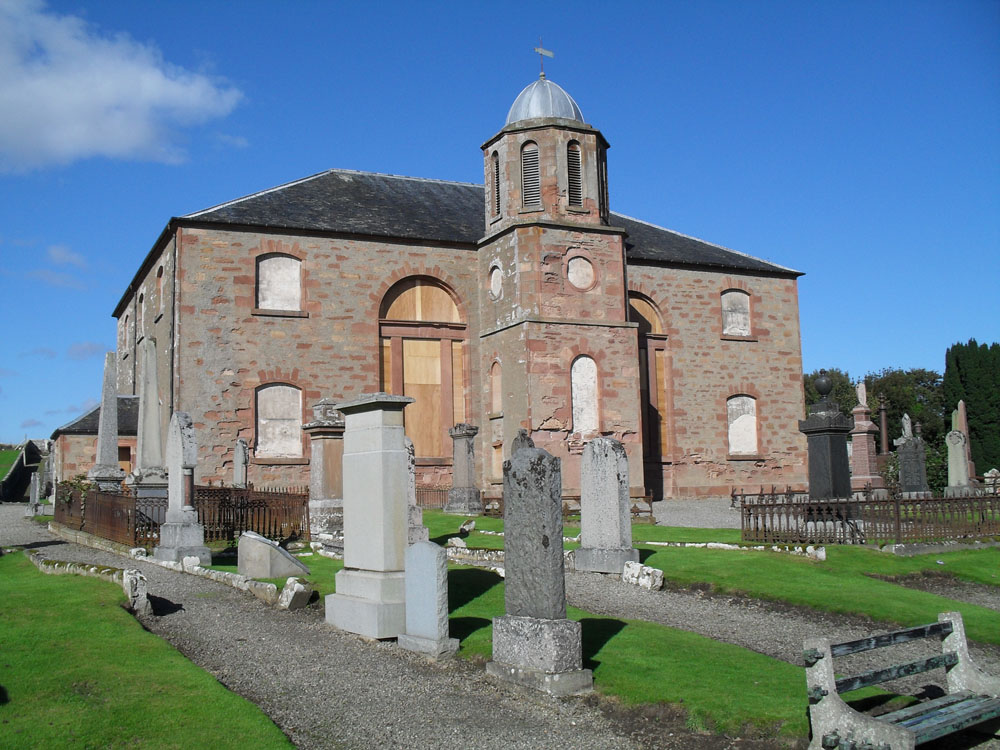
Rosskeen Parish Church

Rosskeen (Scottish Gaelic: Ros Cuimhne) is a parish in Ross and Cromarty on the Cromarty Firth in northern Scotland, containing the settlements of Invergordon, Bridgend and Saltburn. It lies on the A9 between Inverness and Thurso.

== Notable Buildings ==
- Newmore Farmhouse (1845) by Andrew Maitland
- Rosskeen Parish Church (1833) under threat of demolition since 1972
- Rosskeen Free Church (c.1870)

Invergordon Castle was formerly the principal residence but was demolished in 1928.

== Notable Features ==
The Rosskeen Stone, a prehistoric standing stone.

The highest hill in the parish is Càrn Chuinneag, at 838m high. The parish contains two rivers: Balnagowan (Rorie) and the Alness.

== Notable persons ==
- Rev David Carment parish minister 1822 to 1843 and founder of Rosskeen Free Church of which he was minister 1843 to 1856
- Very Rev John MacDonald (1860-1947) Moderator of the General Assembly of the Free Church of Scotland in 1915.
