= John Sinclair, 11th Earl of Caithness =

Scottish Noble

John Sinclair, 11th Earl of Caithness (died 1789) was a Scottish noble, Earl of Caithness and chief of the Clan Sinclair, a Highland Scottish clan.

John was the eldest son of William Sinclair, 10th Earl of Caithness who died in 1779.

John Sinclair, 11th Earl of Caithness entered the army as an ensign in the 17th Regiment of Foot in September 1772. On 27 December 1777 he became a major in the 76th Regiment of Foot. He served for some time in America where he was wounded in the groin by a musket ball while reconnoitering with Sir Henry Clinton at the Siege of Charleston. Sinclair succeeded his father as earl in 1779 and he held the rank of lieutenant-colonel in February 1783. (The 76th was disbanded in 1784 in Scotland). Sinclair died suddenly in 1789 in London in the 33rd year of his age. He had committed suicide by shooting himself and was buried at St Marylebone Parish Church, City of Westminster, London.

John Sinclair, 11th Earl of Caithness having died in 1789 ended the direct line of the Sinclair of Greenland and Rattar branch of the Clan Sinclair. The Sinclair of Freswick branch, who descended from William Sinclair of Rattar (d.1663) were the only remaining collateral branch of the Sinclair of Greenland and Rattar branch, and had John Sinclair of Freswick outlived John Sinclair, 11th Earl, he would have succeeded to the earldom. However, Sinclair of Freswick died in 1784 and the earldom therefore went to Sir James Sinclair of Mey who was a direct lineal descendant of George Sinclair, 4th Earl of Caithness.

== See also ==
- Barony of Roslin
- Lord Sinclair
- Lord Herdmanston

Peerage of Scotland
Preceded by William Sinclair	Earl of Caithness; 1779–1789	Succeeded by James Sinclair
