= 76th Regiment of Foot (MacDonald's Highlanders) =

- Active: 1777–1784
- Country: Kingdom of Great Britain
- Branch: British Army
- Type: Infantry
- Size: One battalion
- Engagements: American Revolutionary War

The 76th Regiment of Foot (MacDonald's Highlanders), sometimes referred to as 'MacDonnell's Highlanders' after its colonel, John MacDonnell of Lochgarry, was a Scottish Light Infantry regiment raised in the west of Scotland and western isles of Scotland in 1777.

== History ==
The regiment, which was raised in the west of Scotland and western isles of Scotland on 25 December 1777, by the Clan MacDonald, consisted of seven companies of Highlanders: two of Lowlanders and an Irish company.

It was presented with its colours at Inverness in March 1778 and moved into barracks at Fort George. In March 1779 it moved to Perth where, following a dispute over their pay and bounty payment, soldiers from the regiment took part in the Burntisland mutiny of March 1779, whilst under the command of Major John Sinclair, 11th Earl of Caithness (Lord Berridale), after which it was transferred to Jersey in the Channel Islands and embarked for New York in August 1779. Sinclair, the Earl of Caithness was himself badly wounded during the Siege of Charleston, which took place from March to May 1780, where American and French forces were defeated.

The regiment campaigned from March 1781, under the command of Major Francis Needham, 1st Earl of Kilmorey (who was also the regimental Colonel of the 86th Foot) in the American Revolutionary War and fought at the Battle of Black Swamp in June 1781, and the Battle of Green Spring in July 1781 where they defeated the French Gilbert du Motier, Marquis de Lafayette. The regiment was captured in the Siege of Yorktown three months later in October. It was split up and the troops were interned at various locations throughout Virginia. Following the end of the war, in 1783, it returned to Scotland and was commanded by Sir Robert Stuart. The regiment was finally disbanded at Stirling Castle in March 1784.

== Colonels ==
Colonels of the regiment were as follows:

- 1777–1784: Col John MacDonnell of Lochgarry

* disbanded 1784

== Sources ==
- Brereton, J.M.; Savory, A.C.S. (1993). History of the Duke of Wellington's Regiment. Duke of Wellington's Regiment. ISBN 0-9521552-0-6.
- Döhla, Johann Conrad (1993). Burgoyne, Bruce E. (ed.). A Hessian Diary of the American Revolution. University of Oklahoma Press. ISBN 978-0-8061-2530-5.
- MacLean, John. P. (2010). An Historical Account of the Settlements of Scotch Highlanders in America Prior to the Peace of 1783. Clearfield. ISBN 978-0806302300.
