= Clach a' Mheirlich =

Standing stone in Scotland

Coordinates: 57°41′33″N 4°12′45″W

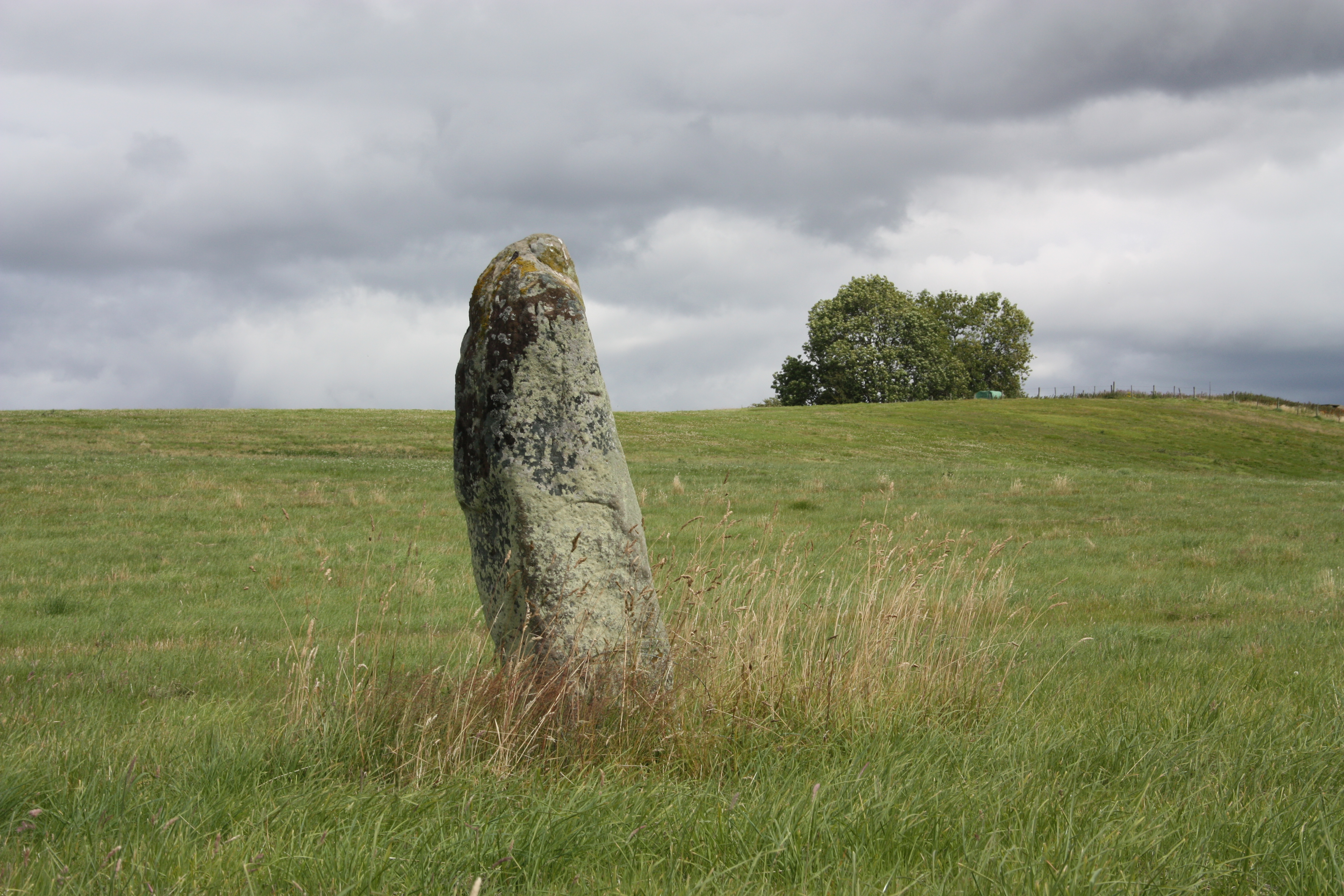
Clach a' Mheirlich, August 2010

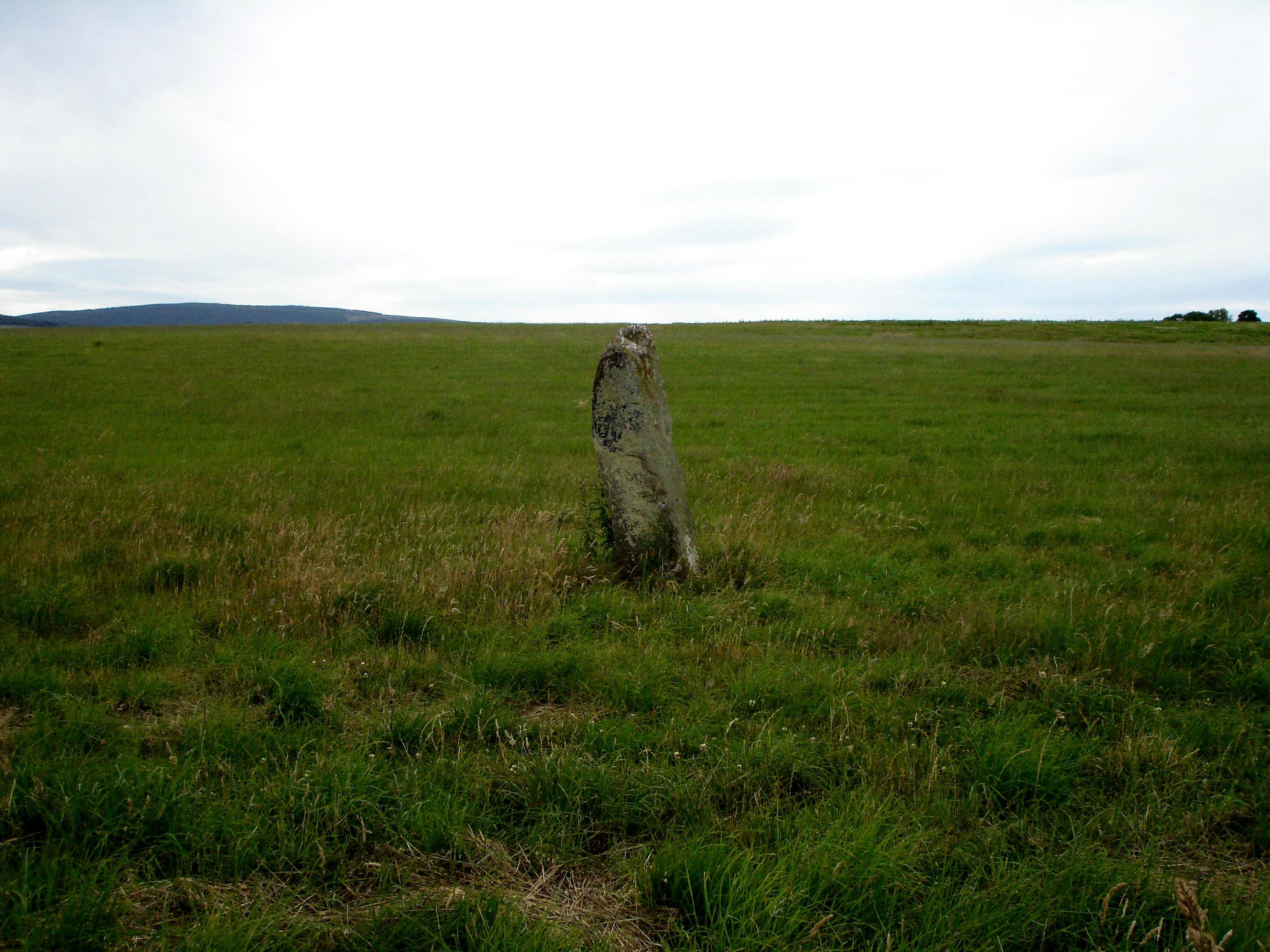
Clach a' Mheirlich, July 2006

The Clach a' Mheirlich (literally, the "Thief's stone") or Rosskeen Stone is a standing stone in a field near Rosskeen, Easter Ross, Scotland.

The stone itself is Bronze Age in origin, but has on it three incised Pictish-style symbols barely visible on the surface of the stone, making it a Class I Pictish symbol stone.

== See also ==
- Celtic art
