= George Sinclair, 15th Earl of Caithness =

George Philips Alexander Sinclair, 15th Earl of Caithness (30 November 1858 – 25 May 1889), was a Scottish hereditary peer.

== Early life and education ==
George Sinclair was the only son of James Sinclair, 14th Earl of Caithness and his first wife Louisa Georgiana Philips (1827-70), daughter of Sir George Philips, 2nd Baronet. He was educated privately and at Magdalene College, Cambridge. On 28 March 1881 he succeeded his father as 15th Earl of Caithness and 2nd Baron Barrogill.

== Later life ==
Lord Caithness served as Lord Lieutenant of Caithness from 1881 until his death in 1889.

== Death ==
Lord Caithness suffered from epilepsy throughout his life. He died following an epileptic seizure at the Palace Hotel in Edinburgh in May 1889 at the age of 30. He never married and did not have any children. By his will, he bequeathed the Castle of Mey and its lands and estates out of the hands of the Sinclairs, leaving the future Earls of Caithness without a family seat. Instead, he left it to his friend, the zoologist Frederick Granville Heathcote on the condition that he legally took the name of Sinclair (which he did) and that he lived in the Castle for at least 3 months of each year (which he also did).

Caithness was succeeded in the earldom by his distant cousin James Augustus Sinclair, 16th Earl of Caithness. There was no heir to the barony of Barrogill, created for the 14th Earl in 1866, which became extinct upon the death of the 15th Earl.

Honorary titles
Preceded by The Earl of Caithness	Lord Lieutenant of Caithness; 1881–1889	Succeeded by The Duke of Portland
Peerage of Scotland
Preceded by James Sinclair	Earl of Caithness; 4th creation 1881–1889	Succeeded by James Augustus Sinclair
