= Skirza =

Fishing village in Caithness, Scotland

Coordinates: 58.59631°N 3.0669°W

Skirza: Scottish Gaelic: Sgiorsa
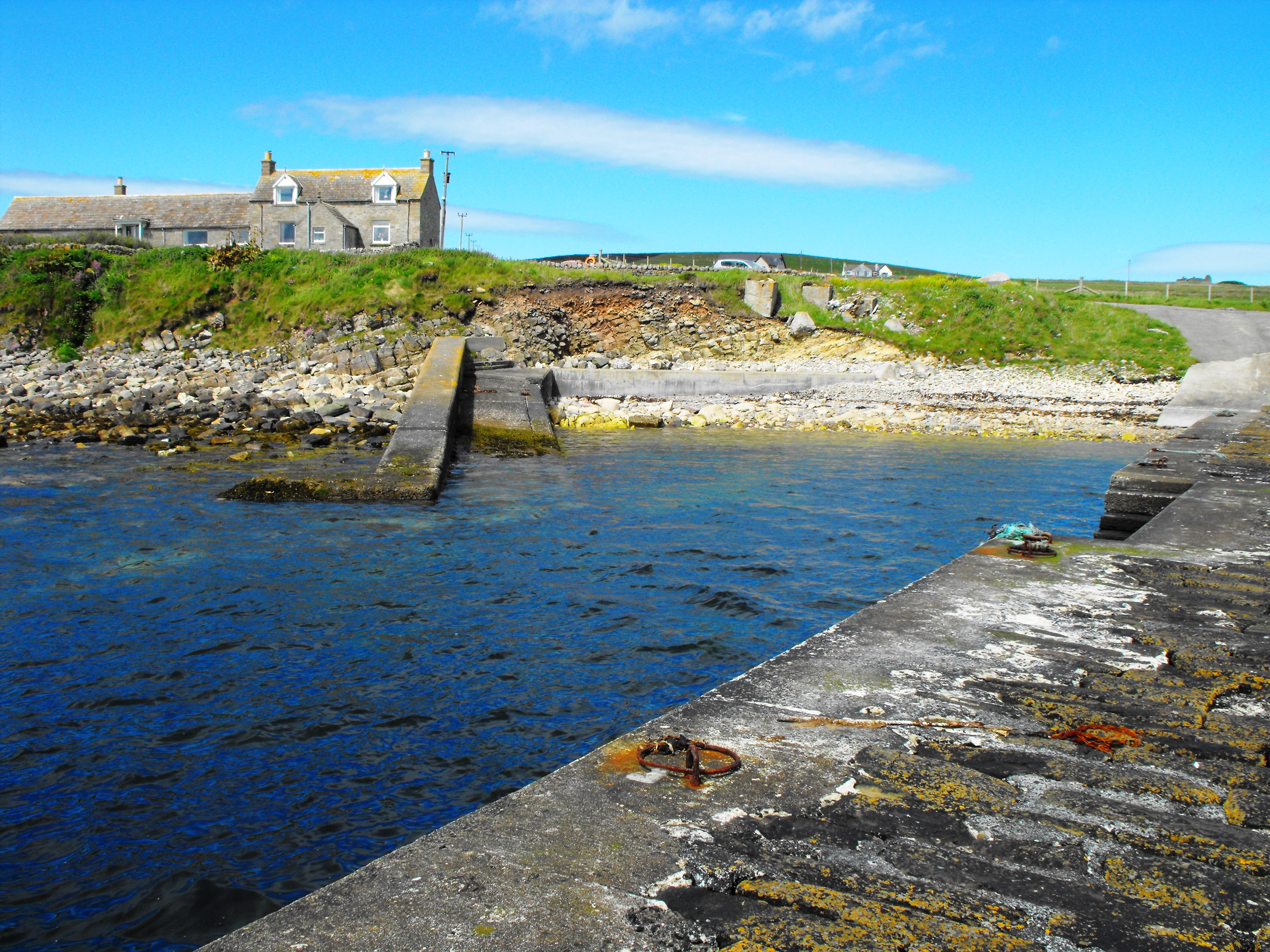
- Skirza Pier

- Location within the Caithness area
- OS grid reference: ND380680
- Council area: Highland
- Country: Scotland
- Sovereign state: United Kingdom
- Post town: Wick
- Postcode district: KW1 4
- Police: Scotland
- Fire: Scottish
- Ambulance: Scottish

Skirza or Skirsa, is a small remote linear fishing village, overlooking Freswick Bay to the south and Skirza Head to the southeast, in eastern Caithness, Scottish Highlands and is in the Scottish council area of Highland. The village of Freswick lies directly southwest of Skirza.

== Broch ==
The remains of the 2nd or 3rd century Broch is located on the promontory of Skirza Head. It measures 22 ft in diameter within a wall 14 ft thick with the entrance in the south-southeast and is protected on the landward side by a 30 foot ditch. South of the entrance is a basin which is some 10 ft deep and 10 ft by 7 ft across.
