= Sinclair baronets =

Baronetcy in the Baronetage of Nova Scotia

There have been seven baronetcies created for individuals with the surname Sinclair: six in the Baronetage of Nova Scotia and one in the Baronetage of Great Britain. Four of these creations remained extant as of 2008.

The Sinclair baronetcy, of Dunbeath in the County of Caithness, was created in the Baronetage of Nova Scotia on 3 January 1631 for John Sinclair. The title became extinct upon his death around 1652.

The Sinclair baronetcy, of Canisbay in the County of Caithness, was created in the Baronetage of Nova Scotia on 2 June 1631 for James Sinclair, a great-grandson of the fourth Earl of Caithness. The seventh Baronet succeeded as twelfth Earl of Caithness in 1789. For further history of the baronetcy, see the article on that title.

The Sinclair, later Sinclair-Lockhart, baronetcy, of Murkle in the County of Caithness and of Stevenston in the County of Haddington, was created in the Baronetage of Nova Scotia on 18 June 1636. For more information on this creation, see Sinclair-Lockhart Baronets.

The Sinclair baronetcy, of Longformacus in the County of Berwick, was created in the Baronetage of Nova Scotia on 10 December 1664 for Robert Sinclair. The title became either extinct or dormant on the death of the seventh Baronet around 1843.

The Sinclair baronetcy, of Kinnaird in the County of Fife, was created in the Baronetage of Nova Scotia around 1675 for James Sinclair. Sir John Sinclair, 4th Baronet (born 1763), succeeded to the title in 1767, but nothing further is recorded about him or the baronetcy.

The Sinclair baronetcy, of Dunbeath in the County of Caithness, was created in the Baronetage of Nova Scotia on 12 October 1704 for James Sinclair, with remainder to his heirs male whatsoever. He was a descendant of George Sinclair, 4th Earl of Caithness. On the death of the fifth Baronet in 1842 the line of the first Baronet failed. The title was assumed by John Sinclair, of Barrock, great-great-grandson of George Sinclair of Barrock, brother of the first Baronet. The seventh Baronet was Vice-Lord-Lieutenant of Caithness. The eighth baronet was the father of politician Susan Cunliffe-Lister, Baroness Masham of Ilton. As of 2011 the eleventh and present Baronet, Sir William Sinclair, is second in line of succession to the earldom of Caithness.

John Sinclair, 1st Baron Pentland, was the eldest son of Captain George Sinclair, youngest son of the sixth Baronet (see the Baron Pentland). Susan Cunliffe-Lister, Baroness Masham of Ilton, was the daughter of the eighth Baronet and the sister of the ninth Baronet.

The Sinclair baronetcy, of Ulbster in the County of Caithness, was created in the Baronetage of Great Britain on 14 February 1786. For more information on this creation, see the Viscount Thurso.

== Sinclair baronets, of Dunbeath (1631) ==
- Sir John Sinclair, 1st Baronet (died c. 1652)

== Sinclair baronets, of Canisbay (1631) ==
- Sir James Sinclair, 1st Baronet (died 1662)
- Sir William Sinclair, 2nd Baronet (died c. 1677)
- Sir James Sinclair, 3rd Baronet (died c. 1710)
- Sir James Sinclair, 4th Baronet (died c. 1730)
- Sir James Sinclair, 5th Baronet (died 1760)
- Sir John Sinclair, 6th Baronet (died 1774)
- Sir James Sinclair, 7th Baronet (1766–1823) (succeeded as Earl of Caithness in 1789)

see the Earl of Caithness for further succession

== Sinclair, later Sinclair-Lockhart, baronets of Stevenson, East Lothian (1636) ==
- see Sinclair-Lockhart baronets

== Sinclair baronets, of Longformacus (1664) ==
- Sir Robert Sinclair, 1st Baronet (died 1678)
- Sir John Sinclair, 2nd Baronet (died after 1696)
- Sir Robert Sinclair, 3rd Baronet (died 1727)
- Sir John Sinclair, 4th Baronet (died 1764)
- Sir Harry Sinclair, 5th Baronet (died 1768)
- Sir John Sinclair, 6th Baronet (died 1798)
- Sir John Sinclair, 7th Baronet (died c. 1843)

== Sinclair baronets, of Kinnaird (c. 1675) ==
- Sir James Sinclair, 1st Baronet (died c. 1702)
- Sir George Sinclair, 2nd Baronet (died 1726)
- Sir John Sinclair, 3rd Baronet (died 1767)
- Sir John Sinclair, 4th Baronet (born 1763)

Nothing further is known of this title

== Sinclair baronets, of Dunbeath (1704) ==
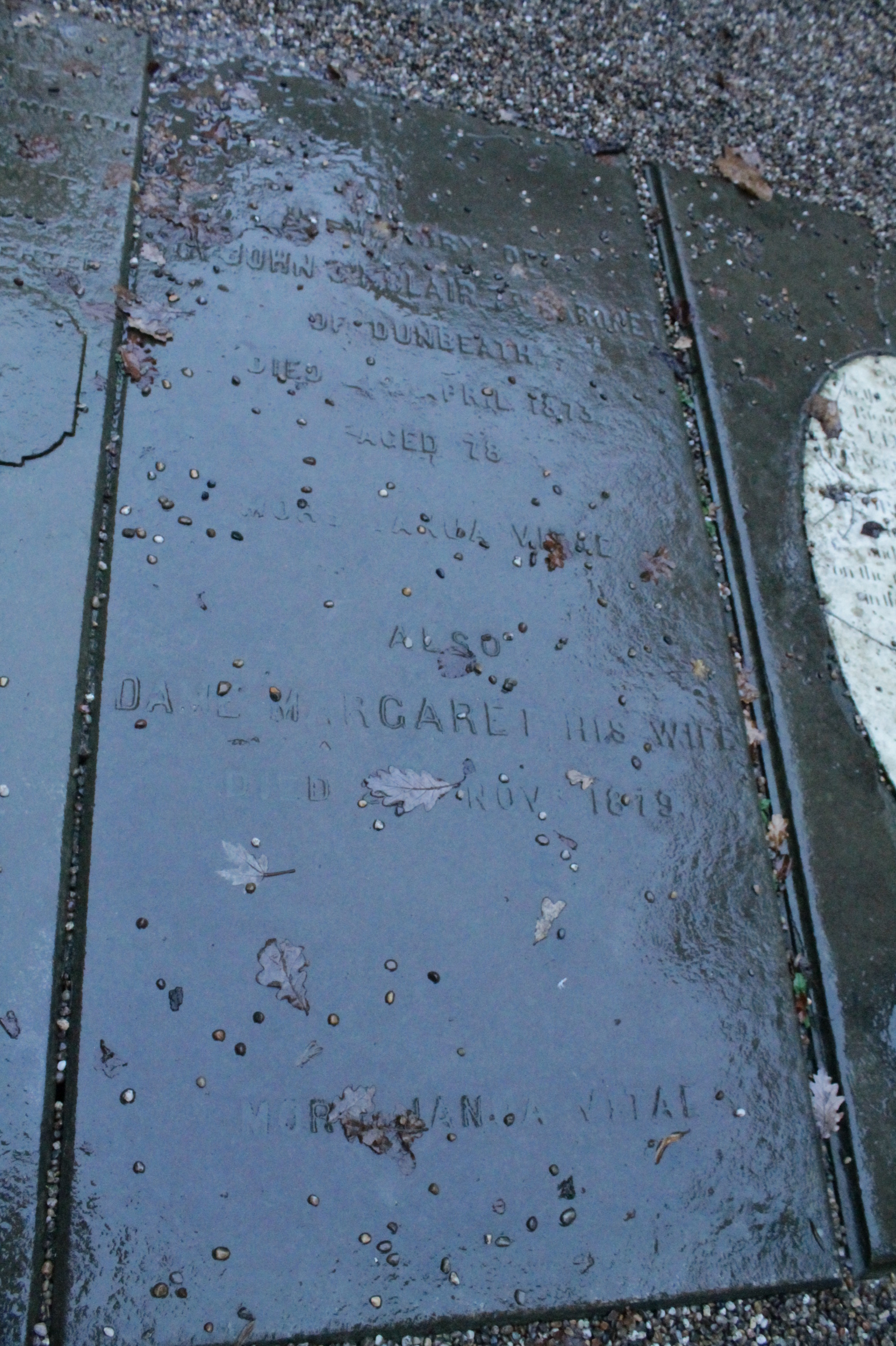
The grave of Sir John Sinclair, 7th Baronet of Dunbeath, Holyrood Abbey

- Sir James Sinclair, 1st Baronet (died 1742)
- Sir William Sinclair, 2nd Baronet (died 1767)
- Sir Alexander Sinclair, 3rd Baronet (died 1786)
- Sir Benjamin Sinclair, 4th Baronet (died 1796)
- Sir John Sinclair, 5th Baronet (died 1842)
- Sir John Sinclair, 6th Baronet (1794–1873)
- Sir John Rose George Sinclair, 7th Baronet (1864–1926)
- Sir Ronald Norman John Charles Udny Sinclair, 8th Baronet (1899–1952)
- Sir John Rollo Norman Blair Sinclair, 9th Baronet (1928–1990)
- Sir Patrick Robert Richard Sinclair, 10th Baronet (1936–2011)
- Sir William Robert Francis Sinclair, 11th Baronet (born 1979)

Coat of arms of Sinclair baronets
Crest A cock Proper. Escutcheon Quarterlt 1st Azure a ship at anchor oars in saltire Or flagged Gules within a double tressure counterflory Or 2nd & 3rd Or a lion rampant Gules armed and langued Azure 4th Azure a ship under sail Or sails Argent and flags Gules over all dividing the four quarteres a cross engrailed Sable the whole within a bordure parted per pale the dexter side indented Gules the sinister Ermine. Motto Fidelitas (Fidelity)

== Sinclair baronets, of Ulbster (1786) ==
- see the Viscount Thurso

== See also ==
- Earl of Caithness
- Baron Pentland
