= James Sinclair, 14th Earl of Caithness =

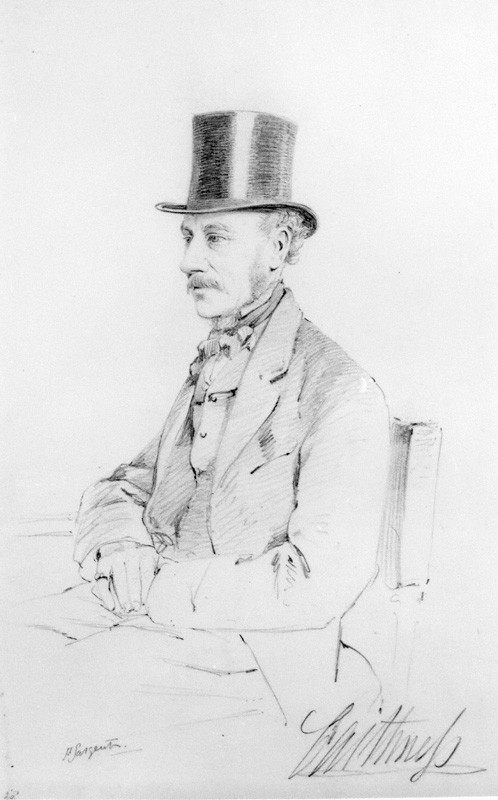
The 14th Earl of Caithness by Frederick Sargent

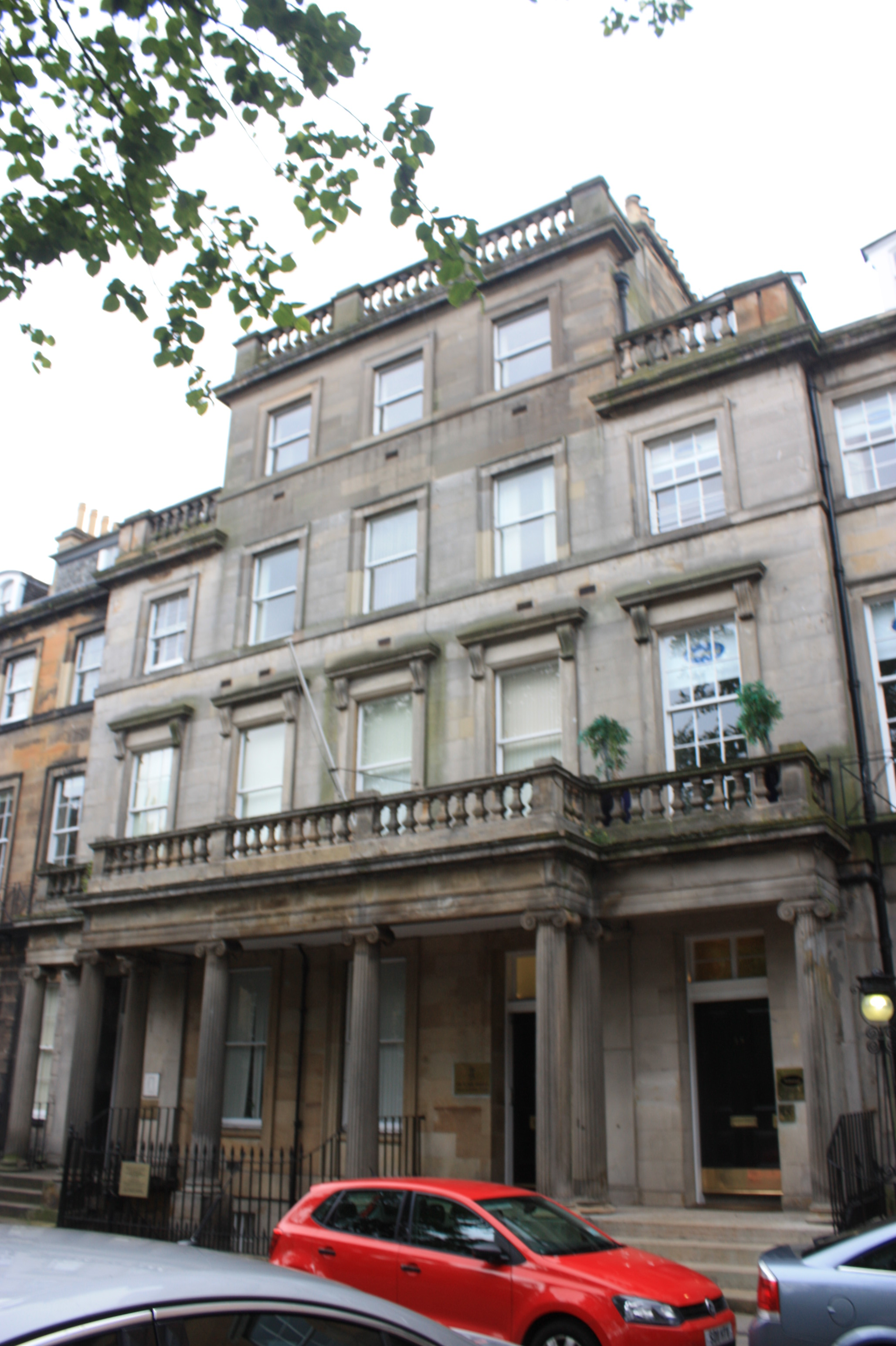
The Earl's Edinburgh townhouse at 17 Rutland Square

James Sinclair, 14th Earl of Caithness, FRS (16 August 1821 – 28 March 1881), styled Lord Berriedale from 1823 to 1855, was a Scottish Liberal politician, scientist and inventor.

== Life ==
Caithness was the son of Alexander Sinclair, 13th Earl of Caithness, and his wife Frances Harriet, daughter of the Very Reverend William Leigh, Dean of Hereford. He inherited the title in 1855 on the death of his father.

He was a Vice-Admiral of Caithness, tutor to Edward, Prince of Wales, (the future Edward VII) and was a Lord in Waiting to Queen Victoria - 1856–58, and 1859–66. Queen Victoria created him the 1st Baron Barrogill, in 1866, taking the Barony's name from the Castle of Mey which was then known as Barrogill Castle. This is a peerage of the United Kingdom which can only pass down the direct male line, and became extinct on the death of his son, George Sinclair, 15th Earl of Caithness. He sat as a Scottish representative peer in the House of Lords from 1858 to 1866. He was elected a Scottish representative peer in 1858, and served in the Liberal administrations of Lord Palmerston and Lord Russell as a Lord-in-waiting (government whip in the House of Lords) between 1859 and 1866. The latter year was when Caithness was created Baron Barrogill, of Barrogill Castle in the County of Caithness, in the Peerage of the United Kingdom, which entitled him to an automatic seat in the House of Lords. Between 1856 and 1881 he held the post of Lord-Lieutenant of Caithness.

He was also a respected scientist and inventor and was a Fellow of the Royal Society. The short biography attached to his pencil portrait explains that he was an inventor of a steam carriage, (actually the modifier for safety reasons), the gravitating compass and a tape-loom. He was a great industrial improver, with great enthusiasm for modern machinery. He introduced “steam” to Caithness by improving and making previous designs safer. First came his “steam car” in 1860, followed by the steam plough which he used to create his new farm at Philip Mains, Mey. He also invented an automatic rail-carriage-washer for the American market. One of his most unexpected inventions was an artificial leg, with which he won a prize at the French Exhibition in Paris in 1866. In 1877, he published “Lectures on Popular and Scientific Subjects”.

In addition to residing at the Castle of Mey in Scotland, he also lived in a large stately home called Stagenhoe in the village of St Paul's Walden in the county of Hertfordshire. This would have been his main residence while tutoring the young Edward VII Prince of Wales, sitting in the House of Lords and attending Royal Society meetings in London.

Lord Caithness married firstly Louisa Georgiana, daughter of Sir George Richard Philips, 2nd Baronet, in 1847. They had one son and one daughter. In the 1850s he had a huge Georgian townhouse at 17 Rutland Square in Edinburgh.

After her death in 1870 he married secondly Marie de Mariategui, daughter of José de Mariategui, in 1872, though they had no children. In 1879 she was created Duchess of Pomar by Pope Leo XIII. Lord Caithness died in New York City at the Fifth Avenue Hotel in March 1881, aged 59, and was succeeded in the earldom by his only son George. The Countess of Caithness died in November 1895.

== Notes ==
Honorary titles
Preceded by The 13th Earl of Caithness	Lord Lieutenant of Caithness; 1856–1881	Succeeded by The 15th Earl of Caithness
Peerage of Scotland
Preceded by Alexander Campbell Sinclair	Earl of Caithness; 4th creation 1855–1881	Succeeded by George Philips Alexander Sinclair
Peerage of the United Kingdom
New creation	Baron Barrogill; 1866–1881	Succeeded by George Philips Alexander Sinclair
