= Dounreay Castle =

16th Century Castle in Scotland

Coordinates: 58.5784°N 3.7505°W

Dounreay Castle is a ruined 16th-century L-plan castle, about 8 miles (13 km) west of Thurso, Highland (council area), Scotland, within the grounds of Dounreay Nuclear Power Development Establishment. It is also known as Dounreay House. The castle and its associated structures are a scheduled monument.

== History ==
The castle is thought to date from the latter part of the 16th century. It was a property of the Sinclairs, the owner in 1614 being William Sinclair of Dunbeath, while in 1726 it was one of the lodgings of the Earl of Caithness. Ownership passed to the Forbeses, to the Mackays of Reay, and then to the Mackays of Tongue. Occupation continued until 1863, but the castle was unroofed and ruinous by 1910. The site was used a farm, with the courtyard being the farmyard, with the first of two ranges of cottages possibly being added south east of the castle in the 17th century.

Cromwellian troops were housed in the castle in the mid-17th century. The site was leveled with the exception of the castle and the north-east cottage block during the building of the research establishment.

== Structure ==
The castle comprised a three-storey main block, and the jamb containing a scale-and-platt stair. Above an unvaulted basement was the hall. The dimensions of the main block were 39.5 feet (12.0 m) by 23.67 feet (7.21 m), and those of the wing 14.33 feet (4.37 m) by 18.5 feet (5.6 m), while the walls were about 3.5 feet (1.1 m). The entrance is in the re-entrant angle of the jamb, below the staircase.

The castle was enclosed by a barmkin, parts of which survive on the south western and seaward sides. The former is keyed into the tower and the latter has been incorporated into a later cottage wall. A kitchen range was added, built against the barmkin, and blocked an original gun loop in the tower.

The north west angle of the castle has collapsed, as has part of the western wall, filling much of the interior with rubble. In addition, the northern wall was bulging outwards as of 1964.

In 1997–1998 an "archaeological monitoring exercise" was conducted in the castle courtyard and on the beach. Due to security concerns, the 2-square-metre (22 sq ft) test pits were excavated by machine, supervised by the archaeologists remotely and by local staff on site. Little was found other than a large millstone, probably associated with the mill depicted on the 1st edition of the Ordnance Survey map.

== See also ==
- Castles in Great Britain and Ireland
- List of castles in Scotland
