= Edinburgh Pentlands =

Edinburgh Pentlands may refer to:

- Edinburgh Pentlands (UK Parliament constituency), 1950–2005
- Edinburgh Pentlands (Scottish Parliament constituency), from 1999
