= Baile Mhargaite (Sandy Dun) =

Baile Mhargaite Broch
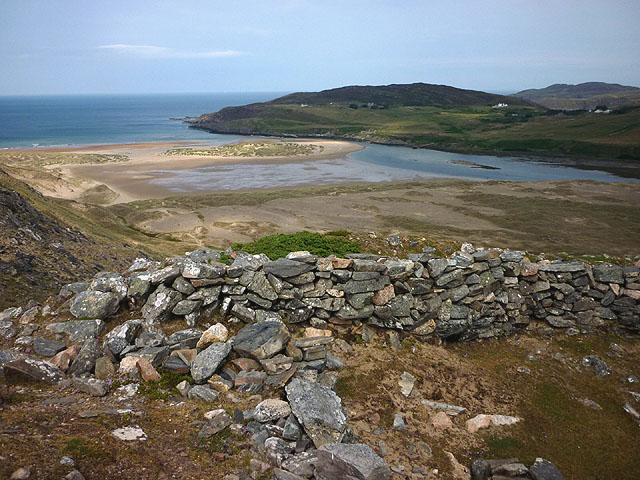
- Inner wall of the broch

- Location in Highlands, Scotland
- 58.517371°N 4.238048°W
- Type: Broch
- Periods: Iron Age, Roman
- Location: Sutherland

Baile Mhargaite (also known as Lochan Druim An Duin, the Sandy Dun, or Invernaver Broch) is an Iron Age broch in Strathnaver, Sutherland. It is a scheduled monument.

== Description ==
Baile Mhargaite broch (also referred to as Sandy Dun or Invernaver broch) has a visible circumference of roughly 8.5 meters, though the broch structure itself is fairly tumbled and filled with stone rubble and sand. The walls are preserved up to approximately a meter in height and 4 meters in thickness. Abutting the broch to the west is a small building annex measuring 8 meters by 5 meters. The original entrance to the broch is unknown, though it is thought that a partially exposed lintel slab may indicate that the entrance was in the west wall. North of the possible entrance is a short stretch of a base course of stones, and there are further potential wall remains adjacent to the access way.

West of the broch and annex is a natural ditch that is thought to have been part of the brochs defence. On the other three sides the broch was protected by steep rock slopes. In addition to the ditch there are also remains of an outer wall on the west side, though the poor state of preservation makes it difficult to assess the extent of this defensive wall.

== Archaeological finds ==
The broch has never been excavated and no finds have been reported.
