= Freswick =

Hamlet in Caithness, Scotland

Coordinates: 58.5922°N 3.0866°W

Freswick: Scottish Gaelic: Freasaig
- Bucholly Castle, historically known as Freswick Castle.

- Location within the Caithness area
- OS grid reference: ND3667
- Council area: Highland
- Lieutenancy area: Caithness
- Country: Scotland
- Sovereign state: United Kingdom
- Police: Scotland
- Fire: Scottish
- Ambulance: Scottish
- UK Parliament: Caithness, Sutherland and Easter Ross
- Scottish Parliament: Caithness, Sutherland and Ross

Freswick (/ˈfrɛzɪk/ FREZZ-ik) or Skirza, is a hamlet, overlooking Freswick Bay to the east, in eastern Caithness, Scottish Highlands and is in the Scottish council area of Highland. The village of Skirza lies directly northeast of Freswick.

== Name ==
The name Freswick probably originates from the Old Norwegian Frøysvík meaning 'Freyr's bay'. Current Fresvik is a village in Norway. It is also suggested that Freswick stemms from 'Frisians' wick', similar to the toponyms Vreeswijk and Friezenwijk in the Netherlands. There is a connection with former Frisia and Freswick concerning early-medieval brooches that have been found. A fragments of Viking-Age fibula, so-called penannular brooch type, found at Freswick by Bremner in 1939 has similarities to a fibula fragment found at the hamlet of Hallumerhoek, in the Dutch province of Friesland.

== See also ==
- Fresvik
- Vreeswijk
