= Keiss Castle =

Historic castle in Caithness, Scotland

- Keiss, Caithness in Scotland
- Keiss Castle as seen from the beach.

Site information
- Type: Z-plan tower house
- Open to the public: No
- Condition: Ruined

Location
- Coordinates: 58°32′17″N 3°06′22″W

Site history
- Built: 16th century (possibly on the site of an earlier fort)
- Built by: George Sinclair, 5th Earl of Caithness

Scheduled monument
- Official name: Keiss Castle,350m SSE of Square of Keiss
- Type: Secular castle
- Designated: 29th April 1920
- Reference no.: SM623

Keiss Castle or Old Keiss Castle, is a historic ruined castle near Keiss, Caithness in Scotland.

Built sometime in the late 16th to early 17th century for George Sinclair, 5th Earl of Caithness, it follows a z-plan tower house design and stands perched on sheer cliffs, overlooking Sinclair's Bay. It is suggested the castle was built upon an earlier fortification.

The castle was abandoned in 1755 in favour of a newer built residence, aptly named New Keiss Castle. It is a scheduled monument.

== History ==
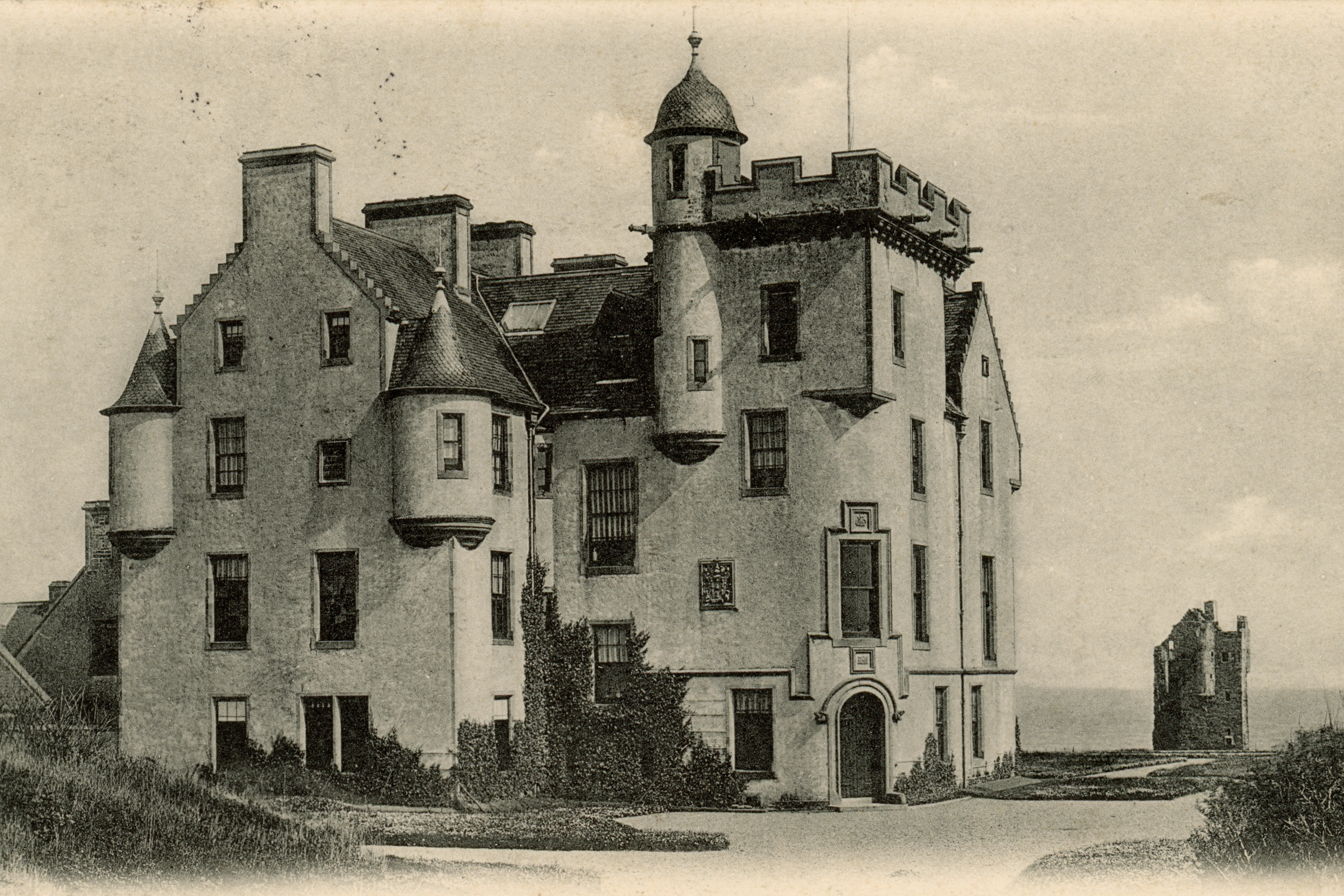
New Keiss Castle in the foreground with old Keiss Castle in the background, circa 1907

The castle was built possibly on the site of an earlier fort in the late 16th or early 17th century by George Sinclair, 5th Earl of Caithness. The 7th Earl died in the castle in 1698 but it is reported that the castle was ruinous in 1700. The estate was purchased by William Sinclair, 2nd Baronet of Dunbeath early in the 18th century and in 1752 Keiss became his family seat.

New Keiss Castle was built in 1755 but had to be sold in 1765 because of financial difficulties to the Sinclairs of nearby Ulbster. This Category B listed baronial mansion was altered to its current form on the instructions of K. Macleay by David Bryce in 1860, during which it was extended in the Scottish baronial style. It was then sold to the Duke of Portland in 1866. Also included in the listing is the Walled garden to the NE of the house and the gate lodge and gate piers with cast-iron carriage gates installed in the 1860 alterations.
