= Robert Pentland =

American politician

Robert Pentland (February 7, 1908 – June 5, 1975) was an American Democratic politician who served in the Missouri General Assembly. He served in the Missouri Senate between 1949 and 1969.

Born in Bowhill, Scotland, he was educated in the public schools of Benld, Illinois. On April 25, 1935, Pentland married Irma Seaman of Chicago, Illinois, in St. Louis, Missouri. He has also worked as a coal miner, a grocery clerk, a warehouseman, a representative for the Teamsters Union. He served two years with the 5th Marine Division during World War II.
