= Keiss =

Coordinates: 58.535°N 3.119°W

Keiss: Scottish Gaelic: Cèis
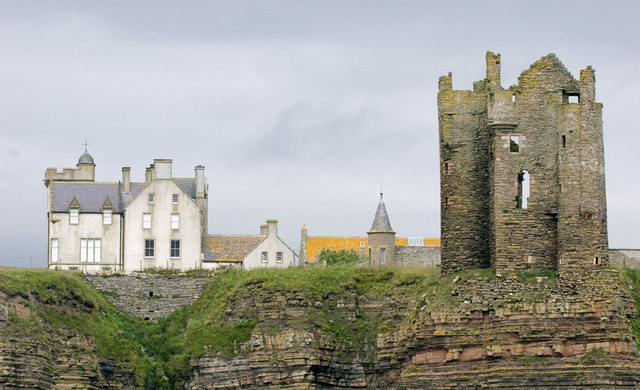
- New and old castles, Keiss

- Location within the Caithness area
- OS grid reference: ND3461
- Civil parish: Wick
- Council area: Highland
- Lieutenancy area: Caithness
- Country: Scotland
- Sovereign state: United Kingdom
- Post town: WICK
- Postcode district: KW1
- Dialling code: 01955
- Police: Scotland
- Fire: Scottish
- Ambulance: Scottish
- UK Parliament: Caithness, Sutherland and Easter Ross
- Scottish Parliament: Caithness, Sutherland and Ross

Keiss (Scottish Gaelic: Cèis) is a fishing village at the northern end of Sinclair's Bay on the east coast of Caithness in Scotland's Highland Council area.

== Keiss castle ==
Keiss Castle, which is now partially ruined, is located less than 1 mile north of the village centre, on sheer cliffs overlooking the bay, and has been a major tourist attraction for many years. The castle was likely built in the late 16th century and was first recorded as being under the ownership of the Sinclair Earls in 1623. Keiss House replaced Keiss Castle around 1755.

== Notable people ==
- Rev David Carment (1772-1856) leading figure in the Disruption of 1843 born and raised in Keiss.
