= Baron Pentland =

Extinct barony in the Peerage of the United Kingdom

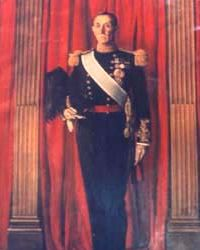
John Sinclair, 1st Baron Pentland.

Baron Pentland, of Lyth in the County of Caithness, was a title in the Peerage of the United Kingdom. It was created in 1909 for the British Liberal politician John Sinclair. He later served as Governor of Madras. Lord Pentland was the son of Captain George Sinclair, younger son of Sir John Sinclair, 6th Baronet, of Dunbeath, a descendant of George Sinclair of Mey, third son of George Sinclair, 4th Earl of Caithness (see Sinclair Baronets and Earl of Caithness for earlier history of the family). The title became extinct on the death of his son, the second Baron, on 14 February 1984.

== Barons Pentland (1909) ==
- John Sinclair, 1st Baron Pentland (1860–1925)
- Henry John Sinclair, 2nd Baron Pentland (1907–1984)

== Coat of arms ==
Coat of arms of Baron Pentland
Crest A cock proper. Escutcheon Quarterly: 1st, azure, a ship at anchor, oars in saltire or, flagged gules, within a double tressure counter-flory of the second; 2nd and 3rd, or, a lion rampant gules, armed and langued azure; 4th, azure, a ship under sail or, sails argent and flags gules; over all, dividing the four quarters, a cross engrailed sable, thereon a mullet for difference, Sinclair; the whole within a bordure parted per pale, the dexter side indented gules, the sinister ermine. Supporters On either side a Scotch deerhound proper, each supporting a banner azure, that to the dexter inscribed with the word "HELP" and that to the sinister with the word "HOLD" Motto Fidelitas (Fidelity)

== See also ==
- Sinclair Baronets
- Earl of Caithness
