= Henry Sinclair, 2nd Baron Pentland =

Lord Pentland

Henry John Sinclair, 2nd Baron Pentland AMICE (6 June 1907 – 14 February 1984) was the President of the Gurdjieff Foundation of New York from its formation in 1953 and the President of the Gurdjieff Foundation of California from its inception in 1955. He held both posts until his death. He also helped ensure the publication of English editions of Gurdjieff's and Ouspensky's books and worked to found Gurdjieff centers throughout North America.

The transatlantic Baron Pentland was a businessman and member of the House of Lords who spent much of his career conducting government and commercial affairs with the United States. He was director and vice president of the American British Electric Corporation

== Education and career ==
Pentland was educated at Wellington College. He inherited the title from his father, John Sinclair, 1st Baron Pentland, in 1925, aged only eighteen. He was admitted to Trinity College, Cambridge, and graduated with an MA in 1929. He was elected President of the Cambridge Union in 1929. He qualified as a civil engineer.

During World War II he served in the British Army and later appointed Assistant Secretary of the Combined Production and Resources Board, 1944–1945 at Washington, D.C.

He was a director and vice president of the American British Electric Corporation. Known for his affiliation with the Work of G. I. Gurdjieff, he became president of the American Gurdjieff Foundation upon its establishment in 1953, retaining the position until his death in New York in 1984.

== Family ==
Lord Pentland married Lucy Elisabeth Babington Smith, daughter of Sir Henry Babington Smith on 11 September 1941; the couple had one daughter, Mary Sinclair (born 21 November 1942).

== Books by Lord Pentland ==
Exchanges Within; Questions from Everyday Life; Selected Meetings with John Pentland in California. 1955-1984. Continuum: New York. 1997.

== Coat of arms ==
Coat of arms of Henry Sinclair, 2nd Baron Pentland
Crest A cock proper. Escutcheon Quarterly: 1st, azure, a ship at anchor, oars in saltire or, flagged gules, within a double tressure counter-flory of the second; 2nd and 3rd, or, a lion rampant gules, armed and langued azure; 4th, azure, a ship under sail or, sails argent and flags gules; over all, dividing the four quarters, a cross engrailed sable, thereon a mullet for difference, Sinclair; the whole within a bordure parted per pale, the dexter side indented gules, the sinister ermine. Supporters On either side a Scotch deerhound proper, each supporting a banner azure, that to the dexter inscribed with the word "HELP" and that to the sinister with the word a"HOLD" Motto Fidelitas (Fidelity)

Peerage of the United Kingdom
Preceded by John Sinclair	Baron Pentland; 1925–1984	Extinct
