= Sinclairs Bay =

Bay in the Scottish Highlands

Sinclair's Bay
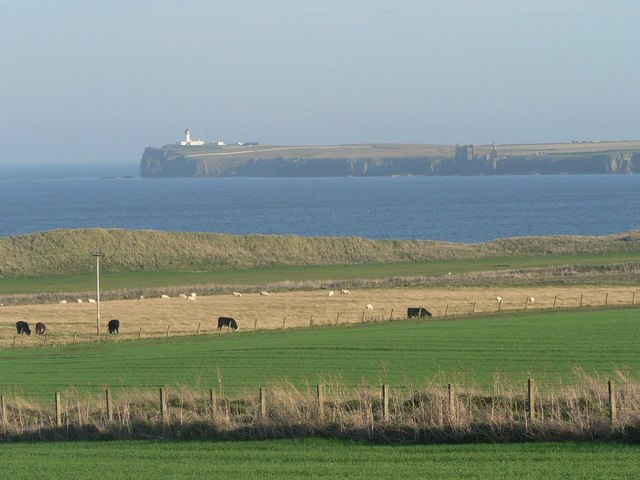
- Noss Head, lighthouse from across Sinclair's Bay

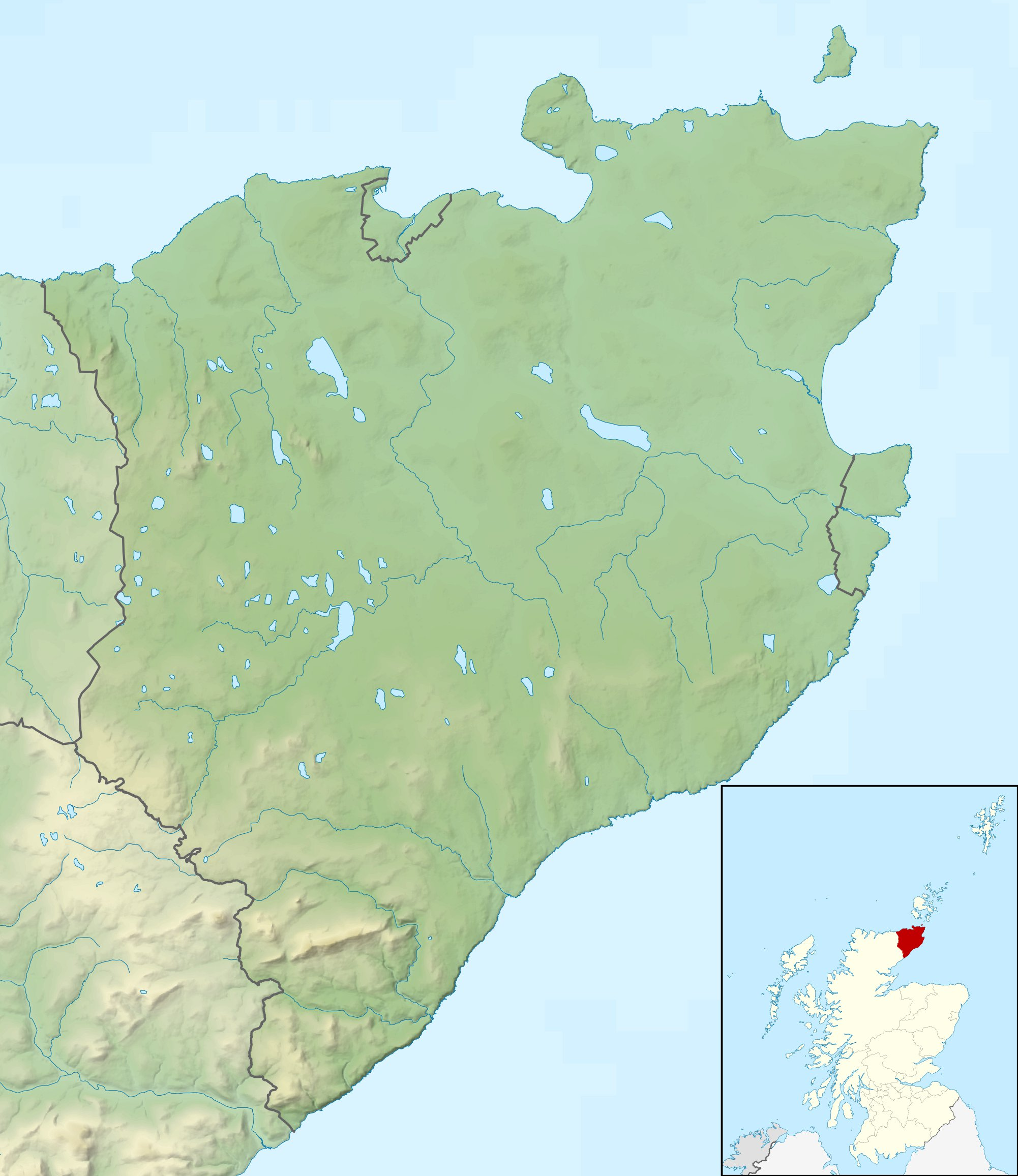
- Location within Caithness
- Location: Caithness, Scotland
- Coordinates: 58°30′20.5848″N 3°05′38.7960″W
- River sources: River of Wester
- Ocean/sea sources: North Sea
- Basin countries: Scotland
- Max. length: 9.45 km (5.87 mi)
- Max. width: 3.51 km (2.18 mi)
- Average depth: 16.2 metres (53 ft)

Sinclairs Bay is a bay on the eastern coast of Caithness, in the Scottish Highlands.

== Geography ==
Starting in the north, at Noss Head, the bay is bounded by Freswick Bay, and overlooked by Skirza Head, the bay proper sweeps south in a long elliptical curve, before sweeping east to pass the remains Castle Sinclair and terminating at Noss Head Lighthouse.

Sinclairs Bay has two primary geological features. Starting at the coastal village of Keiss, running northeast, a stony beach and coastal crags, become cliffs that are increasingly sheer the further north. South of Keiss, the cliffs even out in a large white sandy beach, called Keiss Beach, forming large Dunes of Reiss Beach further south. At Ackergill Tower, the beach again becomes stony and eventually forms into a series of cliffs and crags, further east.
