= Earl of Caithness =

Scottish noble title

Earldom of Caithness
- Creation date: c. 1334
- Peerage: Peerage of Scotland
- First holder: Maol Íosa V, Earl of Strathearn
- Present holder: Malcolm Sinclair, 20th Earl of Caithness
- Heir apparent: James Richard Sinclair, Lord Berriedale
- Remainder to: heirs general of the body of the grantee
- Subsidiary titles: Lord Berriedale
- Seat: London
- Former seat: Castle Sinclair Girnigoe

Earl of Caithness is a title that has been created several times in the Peerage of Scotland, and it has a very complex history. Its first grant, in the modern sense as to have been counted in strict lists of peerages, is now generally held to have been made to Maol Íosa V, Earl of Strathearn, in 1334, although this may have been merely a recognition of his hereditary right to the ancient earldom/mormaership of Caithness. The next year, however, all of his titles were declared forfeit for treason.

== History ==
Earlier, Caithness had been intermittently held, presumably always as fief of Scotland, by the Norse earls of Orkney, at least since the days of the childhood of Thorfinn Sigurdsson in c.1020, but possibly already several decades before. The modern reconstruction of holders of peerage earldoms does not usually include the Mormaerdom of Caithness, although there is no essential difference between them and, for example, the mormaerdoms of Lennox, Strathearn and Angus.

The next grant after Maol Íosa was to David Stewart, a younger son of Robert II of Scotland. His heiress, Euphemia, resigned the title in 1390 in favour of her uncle Walter, 1st Earl of Atholl. Walter himself resigned the title in 1428, in favour of his son Allan, but he retained the earldom of Atholl for himself. Upon Allan's death, Walter again came to hold both earldoms. However, both were lost when he was executed for high treason in 1437, his titles being forfeit.

The third creation of the title was for Sir George Crichton in 1452, but he surrendered the title in the same year. The final creation of the earldom was made in 1455 for William Sinclair, 3rd Earl of Orkney. He surrendered the Orkney title and all associated lands to James III in 1470, in return for the Castle of Ravenscraig, in Fife. James III had in 1469 received the rights of the king of Norway to Orkney territories as pledge of dowry of his wife Margaret of Denmark. In this way, the Scottish crown tightened its grip on Orkney and Shetland, a former Norwegian territory, by moving all other important holders away. Six years later, Earl William wished to disinherit his eldest son, who was known as "the Waster". Therefore, so that his earldom would not pass to him, he resigned the title in favour of his second son from his second marriage, another William. General Arthur St. Clair was reportedly descended from George Sinclair, 4th Earl of Caithness.

George Sinclair, 6th Earl of Caithness, was the last earl to cause a disturbance in the normal succession of the title. In 1672, he agreed that, at his death, all of his lands and titles would pass to Sir John Campbell, who was his creditor. In 1677, the sixth earl died, and King Charles II granted him a patent creating him Earl of Caithness. Later, however, the sixth earl's heir, also named George, was confirmed in his titles by the law. Therefore, in order to compensate for the loss of the earldom, Charles II created Campbell Earl of Breadalbane and Holland. Thereafter, the earldom of Caithness has passed solely within the Sinclair family, without any further resignations or other irregularities.

The Earl of Caithness also holds the title of Lord Berriedale, which was created in the Peerage of Scotland in 1455. That title is used as a courtesy title for the earl's eldest son and heir.

== Earls of Caithness, First Creation (c. 1334) ==
- Maol Íosa V, Earl of Strathearn (forfeit 1335; died before 1353)

== Earls of Caithness, Second Creation (c. 1375) ==
- David Stewart, 1st Earl of Caithness (died before 1389)
- Euphemia Stewart, 2nd Countess of Caithness (resigned 1390; died 1434)
- Walter Stewart, 3rd Earl of Caithness, 1st Earl of Atholl (resigned c. 1428, died 1437)
- Allan Stewart, 4th Earl of Caithness (died 1431)

== Earls of Caithness, Third Creation (1452) ==
- George Crichton, 1st Earl of Caithness (resigned 1452, died 1455)

== Earls of Caithness, Fourth Creation (1455) ==
- William Sinclair, 1st Earl of Caithness (resigned 1476, died 1484)
- William Sinclair, 2nd Earl of Caithness (died 1513)
- John Sinclair, 3rd Earl of Caithness (died 1529)
- George Sinclair, 4th Earl of Caithness (resigned 1545, died 1582)
  - John Sinclair, Master of Caithness (c. 1543 – Sep 1575)
- George Sinclair, 5th Earl of Caithness (1566–1643)
- George Sinclair, 6th Earl of Caithness (resigned 1672, died 1677) ()
- John Campbell, 1st Earl of Breadalbane and Holland (1633–1717) (resigned 1681)
- George Sinclair, 7th Earl of Caithness (died 1698)
- John Sinclair, 8th Earl of Caithness (died 1705)
- Alexander Sinclair, 9th Earl of Caithness (1685–1765)
- William Sinclair, 10th Earl of Caithness (1727–1779)
- John Sinclair, 11th Earl of Caithness (1757–1789)
- James Sinclair, 12th Earl of Caithness (1766–1823)
- Alexander Campbell Sinclair, 13th Earl of Caithness (1790–1855)
- James Sinclair, 14th Earl of Caithness (1821–1881)
- George Philips Alexander Sinclair, 15th Earl of Caithness (1858–1889)
- James Augustus Sinclair, 16th Earl of Caithness (1827–1891)
- John Sutherland Sinclair, 17th Earl of Caithness (1857–1914)
- Norman Macleod (Sinclair) Buchan, 18th Earl of Caithness (1862–1947)
- James Roderick Sinclair, 19th Earl of Caithness (1906–1965)
- Malcolm Ian Sinclair, 20th Earl of Caithness (born 1948) (was elected to remain in the House of Lords in 1999)

The heir apparent is the present holder's son Alexander James Richard Sinclair, Lord Berriedale (born 1981)
