= Hatton Castle, Aberdeenshire =

Castle in Aberdeenshire, Scotland

Coordinates: 57°30′44″N 2°24′25″W

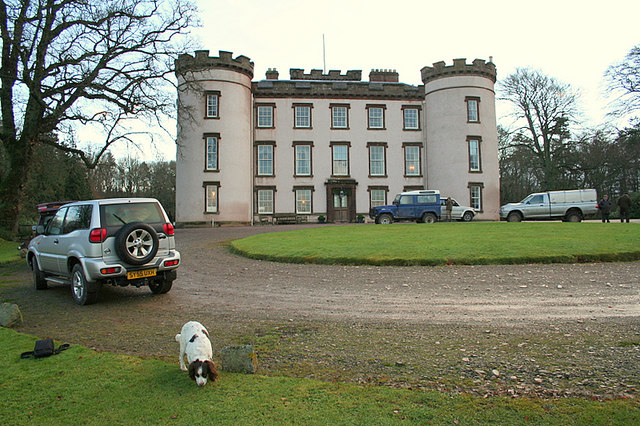
- Hatton Castle in 2008
- Interactive map of Hatton Castle, Aberdeenshire

Inventory of Gardens and Designed Landscapes in Scotland
- Official name: Hatton Castle
- Designated: 29 June 2011
- Reference no.: GDL00399

Hatton Castle is almost three miles (4.8 km) south-east of Turriff, Aberdeenshire in the north-east of Scotland. Formerly known as Balquholly Castle, sometimes spelt as Balquollie, it was renamed in 1814. The 17,994 square feet (1,671.7 m^{2}) mansion was designated a category A listed building in 1972; the gardens are included in the Inventory of Gardens and Designed Landscapes in Scotland.

== History ==
In the early 14th century Robert the Bruce granted the lands, then known as Loscraigie, to Patrick de Monte Alto. Mowat is the anglicisation of de Monte Alto. The Balquholly name was adopted some time before the 16th century. Records indicate there was a castle (spelt Balquholy) on the lands in the early 1500s, but it is likely it may have an earlier date. Purchased by Alexander Duff of Hatton in 1709, although the contracts were not finalised until 1729.

Ownership remained with members of the family into the 21st century. However, the estate was sold in 2020 to an undisclosed buyer.

== Mansion house ==
Construction of the present castellated mansion began in 1812 and was completed by 1814; it was at this time the name was changed to Hatton Castle. It has a round tower at each corner and incorporates sections of the ancient building. (Note: McKean quotes "Hatton embraces a substantial part of the ancient house and strong castle of Balquollie"; other reports vary.) The stone-built mansion has three storeys plus a basement and an attic. A wine cellar and gun room are in the basement. The ground floor hall has a glass cupola set above a stone staircase that provides access to the first floor. There are two bedrooms on the first floor and seven on the second floor; the attic contains four additional bedrooms, a bathroom and storage space.

The mansion was designated a category A listed building by Historic Scotland on 28 November 1972. The gardens are included in the Inventory of Gardens and Designed Landscapes in Scotland and assessed under the historical and architectural sections as outstanding.

A baluster sundial dates to 1703. It is a cube with hollowed arrises sitting on a pyramid. There is also a late-18th-century coach house, rectangular in form, and a square home farm designed by W Leslie in 1828. A T-plan buttress Gothic mausoleum, 1861, is the work of A & W Reid.
