= William Sinclair, 5th Lord Sinclair =

Scottish nobleman

Henry Sinclair
- Lord Sinclair
- Lord Sinclair coat of arms
- Predecessor: Henry Sinclair, 4th Lord Sinclair
- Successor: Henry Sinclair, 6th Lord Sinclair
- Died: 1570
- Noble family: Clan Sinclair
- Father: Henry Sinclair, 4th Lord Sinclair
- Mother: Margaret Hepburn

William Sinclair (died 1570) was a Scottish nobleman and the 5th Lord Sinclair. In The Scots Peerage by James Balfour Paul he is designated as the 4th Lord Sinclair in descent starting from William Sinclair, 1st Earl of Caithness and 3rd Earl of Orkney, but historian Roland Saint-Clair designates him as the 5th Lord Sinclair in descent from the father of the 1st Earl of Caithness and 3rd Earl of Orkney, Henry II Sinclair, Earl of Orkney, who is the first person recorded as Lord Sinclair in public records. Roland Saint-Clair references this to an Act of the Scottish Parliament in which the 4th Lord Sinclair was made Lord Sinclair based on his descent from his great-grandfather, Henry II Sinclair, Earl of Orkney, the first Lord Sinclair. Bernard Burke, in his a Genealogical and Heraldic Dictionary of the Peerage and Baronetage of the British Empire, agrees with Roland Saint-Clair and says that William Sinclair was "in reality" the fifth Lord Sinclair.

== Early life ==
He was the son of Henry Sinclair, 4th Lord Sinclair and Margaret, daughter of Adam Hepburn, Master of Hailes and sister of Patrick Hepburn, 1st Earl of Bothwell. Upon the death of his father in 1513, his mother Dame Margaret Hepburn held the Crown lands of Orkney for nearly thirty years without disturbance or interruption. Her husband, the 4th Lord, had in about 1489, been appointed one of the commissioners to collect the King's rents in Orkney and Shetland and in 1501 had taken a step towards regaining the Isles by obtaining a lease of the earldom for nineteen years. In 1514, it is recorded that the 4th Lord, then deceased, had sold to James IV of Scotland eight pieces of artillery for £100 to be paid to his widow.

== Orkney rebellion ==
In the second year of the widowhood of the mother of the 5th Lord, the Orcadians elected James Sinclair (son of William Sinclair of Wassatter or Warsetter) as their leader and virtual Governor, who, possessed all the wealth of his family despite being illegitimate. He was also a born and bred Orcadian. They withheld their rents to Lady Margaret Sinclair for three years from 1523 to 1525 and forced her son, William Sinclair, 5th Lord Sinclair, to surrender Kirkwall Castle and escape to Caithness. The 5th Lord Sinclair appears on the Council of Nobles that was brought together by James V of Scotland after he had escaped from the Douglases in 1528. Possibly for his support, the King then gave the 5th Lord Sinclair the Letter of Four Forms which sanctioned the invasion of Orkney the following year to try and force James Sinclair to surrender the governorship. Lord Sinclair made an alliance with John Sinclair, 3rd Earl of Caithness who was a close kinsman. Together, they gathered a considerable military force and invaded Orkney but were defeated at the Battle of Summerdale where the Earl of Caithness and 500 of his followers were killed. Lord Sinclair was taken prisoner with others. James Sinclair had prior to the battle already killed some of the Lord Sinclair's friends and attendants in Kirkwall Castle and a week or two after the battle killed thirty men who had tried to find sanctuary in St Magnus Cathedral. King James demonstrated his authority by renewing to Lady Sinclair her rights to the Isles until 1540. However, having defeated the invasion of Orkney, James Sinclair was knighted by King James.

== Royal relations ==
In 1543, the Queen Dowager instituted a suite against Oliver Sinclair of Pitcairns and William Sinclair, 5th Lord Sinclair protested that he should not be connected with what Oliver Sinclair had done.

In 1544, William Sinclair, 5th Lord Sinclair agreed to support the Queen-Mother as regent of Scotland against the Earl of Arran.

== Lands and charters ==
He received a charter for himself and his spouse Elizabeth Keith for the lands of Newburgh, Aberdeenshire and the fishings of the river Ythan on 17 April 1524. He had Sasine of the baronies of Dysart, Fife and Ravenscraig in 1543. He received further charters to him and his wife for the lands of Wilstoun, Carberry and Balbeggy in Fife on 28 June 1547.

In 1542, he received a remission under the Privy Seal of Scotland for having assisted the rebellion of George Home, 4th Lord Home and David Home of Wedderburn.

== Family ==
William Sinclair, 5th Lord Sinclair married Lady Elizabeth Keith, widow of Colin, Master of Oliphant and daughter of William, 3rd Earl Marischal. They had the following children:

1. Henry Sinclair, 6th Lord Sinclair, heir and successor.
2. Magnus Sinclair, of Kinninmonth, who according to The Scots Peerage was born from the 5th Lord Sinclair's second marriage to Mariota Bruce.
3. Margaret Sinclair.

== See also ==
- Barony of Roslin
- Earl of Caithness
- Lord Herdmanston

Peerage of Scotland
Preceded by Henry Sinclair	Lord Sinclair; 1513–1570	Succeeded by Henry Sinclair
