= William Sinclair, 3rd Lord Sinclair =

Scottish nobleman

William Sinclair
- Lord Sinclair
- Lord Sinclair coat of arms
- Predecessor: William Sinclair, 2nd Lord Sinclair
- Successor: Henry Sinclair, 4th Lord Sinclair
- Died: 1487
- Noble family: Clan Sinclair
- Father: William Sinclair, 2nd Lord Sinclair
- Mother: Elizabeth Douglas

William Sinclair of Newburgh, Aberdeenshire (died 1487) was a Scottish nobleman and the 3rd Lord Sinclair. In The Scots Peerage by James Balfour Paul he is designated as the 2nd Lord Sinclair, but historian Roland Saint-Clair designates him the 3rd Lord Sinclair in reference to his descent from his grandfather, Henry II Sinclair, Earl of Orkney, the first Lord Sinclair. Roland Saint-Clair references this to an Act of the Scottish Parliament in which William Sinclair's son, Henry Sinclair, 4th Lord Sinclair, was made Lord Sinclair based on his descent from his great-grandfather, Henry II Sinclair, Earl of Orkney, the first Lord Sinclair. Bernard Burke, in his a Genealogical and Heraldic Dictionary of the Peerage and Baronetage of the British Empire, agrees with Roland Saint-Clair and says that Henry Sinclair was "in reality" the fourth holder of the title of Lord Sinclair.

== Early life ==
He was the eldest son from the first marriage of William Sinclair, 1st Earl of Caithness, 11th Baron of Roslin and 2nd Lord Sinclair to Lady Elizabeth Douglas, daughter of Archibald Douglas, 4th Earl of Douglas. William Sinclair, 3rd Lord Sinclair was reportedly disinherited by his father who had favored his two eldest sons from his second marriage to Marjory Sutherland: he passed the title and lands of the Barony of Roslin to the eldest son from his second marriage, Oliver Sinclair, and the earldom of Caithness to his second son from his second marriage, another William Sinclair. Various reasons have been given for this including that of Father Richard Augustine Hay in his 1690 manuscript history of the Sinclairs which states that the first marriage from which William Sinclair, 3rd Lord Sinclair was born, was unlawful, but this is disputed by historian Roland Sinclair, writing in the late 19th century. Another theory is that as his father's first wife was a Douglas and that as the Clan Douglas were enemies of the Crown this meant that his father would not want to be identified with the Douglas family and did later take the side that opposed the Douglases. According to Roland Saint-Clair, the most likely reason is that William Sinclair, 3rd Lord Sinclair, whilst the Master of Orkney, having imprisoned William Tulloch the Bishop of Orkney was the main reason why his father had lost the earldom of Orkney. However, Roland Saint-Clair states that it is also questionable whether William Sinclair, 3rd Lord Sinclair was actually disinherited at all because he did possess Newburgh, Fife which had previously belonged to David St. Clair who was the brother of Henry I Sinclair, Earl of Orkney, who in turn was the great-grandfather of William Sinclair, 3rd Lord Sinclair.

== Castles and lands ==
William Sinclair, 3rd Lord Sinclair, recorded as "of Newburgh" reached an agreement with his half brother Oliver Sinclair, in which William would receive the lands of Cousland in the sheriffdom of Edinburgh, the barony of Dysart Castle and lands of Ravenscraig, Dulbo, Carbary, and Wilstoun in Fife in return for him and his son Henry renouncing their claims to the Barony of Roslin and it's attached lands. Ravenscraig Castle was the seat of the Lords Sinclair.

== Family ==
William Sinclair, 3rd Lord Sinclair married Lady Christian Leslie, daughter of George Leslie, 1st Earl of Rothes, and they had the following children:

1. Henry Sinclair, 4th Lord Sinclair, heir and successor.
2. Sir William Sinclair of Warsetter and Orkney.
3. Elizabeth Sinclair, married as the second wife to John Glendonwyn.

William Sinclair, 3rd Lord Sinclair died in about 1487.

== See also ==
- Barony of Roslin
- Earl of Caithness
- Lord Herdmanston

Peerage of Scotland
Preceded by William Sinclair	Lord Sinclair; 1480–1487	Succeeded by Henry Sinclair
