= Clan Sinclair =

Highland Scottish clan

- Clann na Ceàrda or Clan na Ceàrdaich
- Crest: A cock rampant
- Motto: Commit thy work to God
- Slogan: Girnigoe! Girnigoe!

Profile
- Region: Highlands
- District: Caithness
- Plant badge: Whin
- Pipe music: "The Sinclair's March" (a.k.a. The Red Ribbon)

Chief
- The Rt. Hon. The Earl of Caithness
- The 20th Earl of Caithness
- Historic seat: Castle Sinclair Girnigoe
Septs of Clan Sinclair
Budge, Caird, Clouston, Cline, Clyne, Groat, Laird, Linklater, Lyall, Mason, Purdie, Purdy, Snoddy, Peace, Wares
Clan branches
Earls of Caithness (chiefs)
Lords Sinclair
Sinclair of Roslin
Sinclair of Thurso
Sinclair of Keiss
Sinclair of Stemster and Dunbeath
Sinclair of Murkle
Sinclair of Assery
Sinclair of Lybster
Sinclair of Scotscalder
Sinclair of Geise
Sinclair of Greenland and Rattar
Sinclair of Freswick
Sinclair of Mey
Sinclair of Ulbster
Sinclair of Durran
Sinclair of Olrig
Sinclair of Dunbeath and Latheron
Sinclair Sutherland of Brabster
Sinclair of Barrock
Sinclair of Stirkoke
Sinclair of Dun
Sinclair of Southdun
Sinclair of Brabsterdorran
Sinclair of Forss
Sinclair of Achingale and Newton
Sinclairs of Lybster, Reay
Sinclairs of Hoy and Oldfield
See also:
Sinclair of Herdmanston
Sinclair baronets
Allied clans
Clan Sutherland (18th century)
Rival clans
Clan Sutherland (16th century)
Murray of Aberscross
Clan Gunn
Clan Campbell

Clan Sinclair (Scottish Gaelic: Clann na Ceàrda [ˈkʰl̪ˠãũn̪ˠ nə ˈkʲaːrˠt̪ə]) is a Highland Scottish clan which holds the lands of Caithness, the Orkney Islands, and the Lothians. The chiefs of the clan were the Barons of Roslin and later the Earls of Orkney and Earls of Caithness.

The Sinclairs are believed to have come from Normandy to England during the Norman conquest of England, before arriving in Scotland in the 11th century. The Sinclairs supported the Scottish Crown during the Scottish–Norwegian War and the Wars of Scottish Independence.

The chiefs were originally Barons of Roslin, Midlothian and William Sinclair, 1st Earl of Caithness and Baron of Roslin founded the famous Rosslyn Chapel in the 15th century. He split the family lands, disinheriting his eldest son from his first marriage, William ("the Waster"), who inherited the title of Lord Sinclair, (Note: The Scots Peerage by James Balfour Paul gives the 1st Lord Sinclair as William Sinclair, 1st Earl of Caithness, and this version is given by the Official Clan Sinclair website's timeline, quoting from Paul's Scots Peerage. However, historian Roland Saint-Clair stated that the 1st Lord Sinclair was the father of the 1st Earl of Caithness, Henry II Sinclair, Earl of Orkney, as recorded by public records. Therefore, the numbering of the Lords Sinclair is one place different from these two different historians. Bernard Burke, in his a Genealogical and Heraldic Dictionary of the Peerage and Baronetage of the British Empire, agrees with Roland Saint-Clair and says that Henry Sinclair (died 1513) and William Sinclair (died 1570) were "in reality" the fourth and fifth Lords Sinclair respectively.) instead giving the lands of Caithness to the second son from his second marriage, William Sinclair, 2nd Earl of Caithness, in 1476, and the lands at Roslin to his eldest son from his second marriage, Sir Oliver Sinclair.

In the 16th century the Sinclairs fought against England during the Anglo-Scottish Wars and also feuded with their neighbors the Clan Sutherland. During the Jacobite rising of 1715 the Sinclairs supported the Jacobite cause, but during the Jacobite rising of 1745, while the clan largely had Jacobite sympathies, their chief, the Earl of Caithness, supported the British-Hanoverian Government.

The current chief is Malcolm Sinclair, 20th Earl of Caithness.

== Origins ==
The surname of Sinclair in French is “de Sancto Claro” and in Latin, “Sanctus Clarus,” meaning Holy Light. The name derives from the hermit St. Clare and St. Clair-sur-Epte, a town near Paris close to the location of the hermit St. Clare's martyrdom.

No certain record exists but it is likely that the Sinclairs came from Saint-Clair in Normandy. The Saint-Clairs first went to England (before they came to Scotland) with William the Conqueror during his invasion of England. The name was originally "Saint-Clair" which was a place name. Richard of Saint-Clair and Brittel of Saint-Clair are both mentioned in the Domesday Book. William of Saint-Clair accompanied Saint Margaret of Scotland, daughter of Edward the Exile to Scotland in 1068, where she eventually married Malcolm III of Scotland. In return for his efforts, the king supposedly granted Sinclair the barony of Roslin, Scotland "in free heritage".

One of the earliest recorded Sinclairs in Scotland was Henry of Saint-Clair/Sinclair, who obtained a charter for the lands of Herdmanston in Haddingtonshire in 1160.

The chiefs of Clan Sinclair, the Earls of Caithness, descend from William St. Clair who was sheriff of Edinburgh and who was granted the barony of Roslin (Rosslyn) in 1280.

== Scottish–Norwegian War ==
During the Scottish–Norwegian War, Haakon IV of Norway invaded Scotland. However, at the Battle of Largs in 1263 he was faced with William St. Clair who commanded a wing of Alexander III of Scotland's army. In 1264, William St. Clair was ordered by King Alexander of Scotland to support the forces of the king of England at the Battle of Lewes.

== Wars of Scottish Independence ==
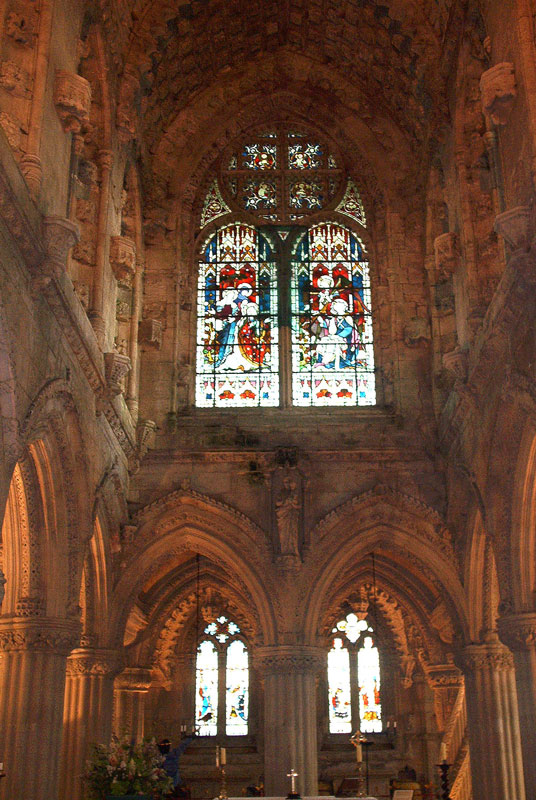
Interior of Rosslyn Chapel which was founded by William Sinclair, 1st Earl of Caithness

During the Wars of Scottish Independence, Sir William Sinclair of Rosslyn was captured at the Battle of Dunbar (1296) and died later, probably in the Tower of London. Henry, his son, was also captured and later sent to St Briavels Castle, and in 1296 he swore fealty to Edward I of England.

In 1303 the Battle of Roslin took place where Scots under Henry Sinclair of Rosslyn and the Clan Comyn defeated an English force. The Battle of Loudoun Hill took place in 1307 where Scots under Robert the Bruce, assisted by Henry Sinclair of Rosslyn again defeated the English.

The family initially favoured John Balliol's claim to the throne but later it became paramount that they gave their loyalty to Robert the Bruce. The Battle of Bannockburn was fought in 1314, where the Clan Sinclair fought in support of Robert the Bruce. After the battle Robert the Bruce gave William Sinclair his sword. The Battle of Donibristle took place in 1317, William Sinclair, Bishop of Dunkeld, rallied the Scots army to defeat an English invading force in Fife.

Sir William Sinclair, heir to Henry, and, it is claimed, his brother John, were among the Scots killed with Sir James Douglas at the Battle of Teba (1330), cutting short their attempt to carry Robert Bruce's heart to the Holy Land. They, or at least their bones, are said to be buried in Rosslyn Chapel. The Battle of Neville's Cross took place in 1346 where Sir John Sinclair of Herdmanston was taken prisoner

== Later 14th century ==
In 1379, Sir Henry Sinclair, who was also Admiral of Scotland claimed the Earldom of Orkney through his mother and received it from Haakon VI of Norway. However the earldom of Orkney was later resigned by order of James III of Scotland.

Henry I Sinclair, Earl of Orkney, Baron of Roslin, and Lord of Shetland (c.1345-c.1400), was a Scottish explorer nobleman. In 1391, he conquered the Faroe Islands. He is also alleged to have voyaged as far as the Americas in 1398 (being hypothetically identified with Zichmni, who travelled with the Zeno brothers, for the first time by Johann Reinhold Forster in 1784); believers in this hypothesis claim he possibly landed in both Massachusetts and Nova Scotia. The voyage to America been dismissed as a recent myth and was not mentioned by writers who lived at the same time or shortly after nor by the 17th century writers who also wrote about him. According to a biography published many years after his death, he died in battle against the English around the year 1400.

== 15th century ==
Henry II Sinclair, Earl of Orkney was taken prisoner by the English at Battle of Homildon Hill in 1402 but was soon released. In 1406 he escorted Prince James to France but the ship was captured by the English and both were imprisoned in the Tower of London. In 1407 he escaped or was released on payment of a ransom.

William Sinclair, 1st Earl of Caithness (3rd Earl of Orkney and Baron of Roslin) was High Chancellor of Scotland between 1454 and 1458. He had been granted the earldom of Caithness in 1455. He split the family lands, disinheriting his eldest son from his first marriage, William ("the Waster"), who later became the Lord Sinclair, instead giving the lands of Caithness to the second son from his second marriage, William Sinclair, 2nd Earl of Caithness, in 1476, and the lands at Roslin to his eldest son from his second marriage, Sir Oliver Sinclair.

== 16th century ==
William Sinclair, 2nd Earl of Caithness was killed fighting for James IV of Scotland at the Battle of Flodden in 1513. There was a loss of 300 Sinclairs including George Sinclair of Keiss, Henry Sinclair, 4th Lord Sinclair, Sir John Sinclair of Herdmanston, the Bishop of Caithness as well as James IV of Scotland.

John Sinclair, 3rd Earl of Caithness (1490–1529) died at the Battle of Summerdale in May 1529 in Orkney. He was succeeded by his son George Sinclair, 4th Earl of Caithness. William Sinclair, 5th Lord Sinclair was taken prisoner. At the Battle of Solway Moss in 1552, Scots commanded by Oliver Sinclair of Pitcairns were beaten by the English. In 1568, Henry Sinclair, 6th Lord Sinclair assisted Mary, Queen of Scots, to escape from Loch Leven Castle. In 1570, John Sinclair, Master of Caithness, son of George Sinclair, 4th Earl of Caithness burned the local Cathedral in pursuit of the Morays who had taken refuge in the steeple. George Sinclair, 4th Earl of Caithness later imprisoned his son, the Master of Caithness, for making peace with the Morays.

In 1588 Castle Sinclair Girnigoe withstood a siege by the Earl of Sutherland and in 1590 George Sinclair, 5th Earl of Caithness invaded Sutherland which resulted in the Battle of Clynetradwell. On 3 April 1593, George, 5th Earl of Caithness resigned his earldom in return for novodamus and remainder to his son William Sinclair. On 11 December William Sinclair of Mey was knighted by King James VI of Scotland.

== 17th century and Civil War ==
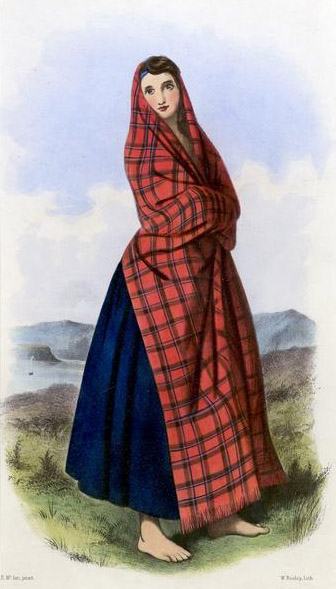
A Victorian era, depiction of a member of the clan by R. R. McIan, from The Clans of the Scottish Highlands, published in 1845.

On 21 October 1601, Henry Sinclair, 6th Lord Sinclair died and was succeeded by grandson Henry. In 1606, George 5th Earl of Caithness, was by an Act of Parliament allowed to change the name of Girnigoe Castle to Sinclair Castle. See: Castle Sinclair Girnigoe.

The Battle of Kringen took place on 26 August 1612 in Otta, Norway. George Sinclair was killed with most of his men in an ambush.

In 1650 Major Sinclair assisted James Graham, 1st Marquess of Montrose at the Battle of Carbisdale where they were defeated. (Note: Major Sinclair was John Sinclair, son of Alexander Sinclair of Brims, son of Richard Sinclair of Brims, son of William Sinclair, 2nd of Stemster and Dunbeath, son of Alexander Sinclair, 1st of Stemster and Dunbeath, son of William Sinclair, 2nd Earl of Caithness.) They escaped to Ardvreck Castle, but there they were betrayed by MacLeod of Assynt and were executed. Sir William Sinclair of Rosslyn was killed at the Battle of Dunbar (1650) and was the last knight to be buried in full armour below Rosslyn Chapel. General Monck sacked Rosslyn Castle but the Chapel was spared. In 1651, at the Battle of Worcester, John Sinclair, 10th Lord Sinclair was captured by Cromwell's forces and imprisoned in the Tower of London and then at Windsor Castle until 1660 when he was liberated by General Monck. In 1657, George Sinclair 6th Earl of Caithness was present when Oliver Cromwell was proclaimed Chief Magistrate of the three nations in Edinburgh.

In 1680 a feud took place between George Sinclair of Keiss and Sir John Campbell of Glenorchy over the right to the lands and title of the earldom of Caithness. This resulted in the Battle of Altimarlach, where, legend has it that so many Sinclairs were killed that the Campbells were able to cross the river without getting their feet wet. Clearly, however, the Sinclairs had influence in high places as only a few years later, in 1681, they regained the earldom by an order of Parliament. In 1698, George Sinclair 7th Earl of Caithness died. He was succeeded by John Sinclair of Murchill (Murkle) 8th Earl, his cousin.

== 18th century and Jacobite risings ==
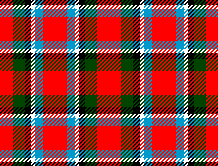
Sinclair dress tartan (modern)

During the Jacobite rising of 1715 the Clan Sinclair supported the Jacobite cause, however by the time of the Jacobite rising of 1745 the Clan Sinclair supported the British Hanoverian Government.

In 1708, Chief John, Master of Sinclair (Son of Henry Lord Sinclair) after killing two men in duels was exiled to Prussia but later pardoned by Anne, Queen of Great Britain. In 1715, John Master of Sinclair captured a vessel with 420 stand of arms bound for the Earl of Sutherland. In 1715, at the Battle of Sheriffmuir, David Sinclair of Brabsterdorran fought for Jacobite cause, as did John, Master of Sinclair who fled to Orkney and then to Europe. On 3 November 1733, John Sinclair of Murkle the younger son of John 8th Earl created Lord Murkle. In 1736, Sir James Sinclair glazed the windows for the first time of Rosslyn Chapel, relaid the floor with flagstones and repaired the roof of the chapel. In 1736, Sir James Sinclair of Rosslyn resigned his office as hereditary Grand Master Mason of Scotland to the Scottish Lodges on their foundation. He was later reappointed for his life. The Sinclairs of Roslin (Rosslyn) laid claim to be hereditary Grand Master Masons of Scotland. In 1739 forty-four Scottish Freemasons' Lodges met in Edinburgh to found the Grand Lodge of Scotland. William St Clair was a candidate for Grand Master and promptly became the first elected Grand Master after offering to surrender his hereditary rights. On 17 June 1739 Major Malcolm Sinclair 'A good and faithful servant of Sweden' was charged with affairs of State, he was assassinated at Grunberg in Silesia by agents of Tsaritsa Anna of Russia.

On 4 June 1745, Sir James Sinclair of Rosslyn, a lieutenant general with the Royal Scots regiment, was appointed the commander of the British Forces in Flanders. On 16 April 1746, at the Battle of Culloden, he commanded the Royal Scots regiment on the British-Hanoverian Government side. The Jacobite rebel, John Mackenzie, Lord MacLeod, tried raising the Sinclairs in arms but had little success: only about thirty men under Sinclair of Scotscalder arrived at the place of muster, and Sinclair of Scotscalder's estates were later forfeited. However, the Clan Sinclair was strongly Jacobite, but after hearing the news of the Jacobite failure at the Battle of Culloden, this apparently made them "sneak home again". It was also reported that had Lord Sutherland and Lord Reay not been in their way then the Sinclairs would have been among the first of the rebels, with about 500 Caithness Sinclairs who were ready to join the Jacobites, although the Earl of Caithness, their chief, supported the British Government. When Duncan Forbes, Lord Culloden was forming the 18 Independent Highland Companies to oppose the Jacobite rising of 1745 the Sinclairs were not offered a company. In 1750, Sir William Sinclair of Dunbeath founded the Baptist church at Keiss.

A Clan Sinclair flag is reported to have been found at Culloden battlefield after the event, however most of the flags of the Prince Charles' army that were captured at Culloden were burnt by the public hangman in Edinburgh. A list was made of those flags, but only contains brief descriptions.

== Castles ==
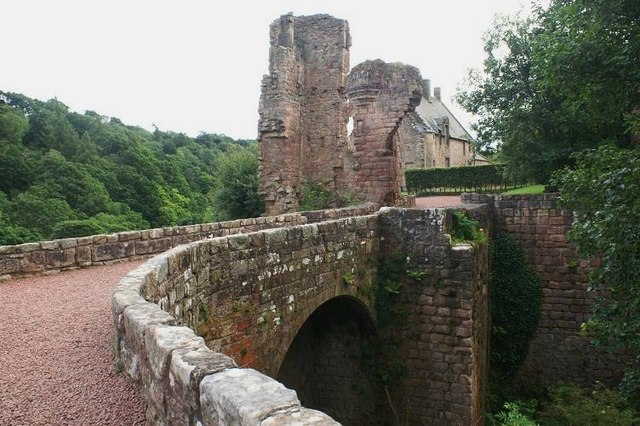
The ruins of Roslin Castle, former seat of the Sinclair Barons of Roslin

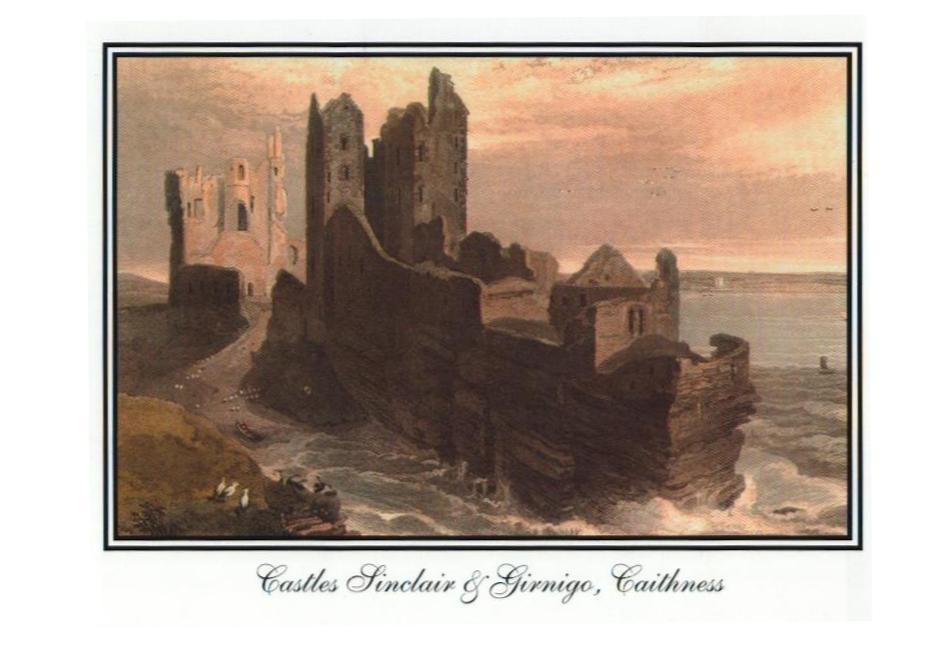
The ruins of Castle Sinclair Girnigoe as it appeared in 1821, historic seat of the Earls of Caithness, chiefs of Clan Sinclair

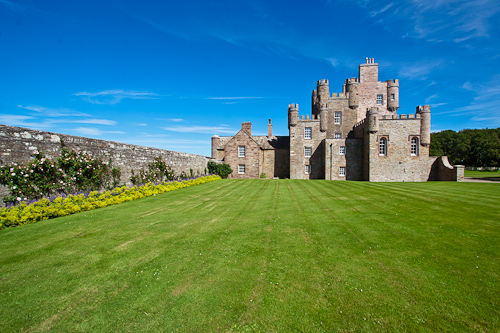
The Castle of Mey, former seat of the Sinclairs of Mey

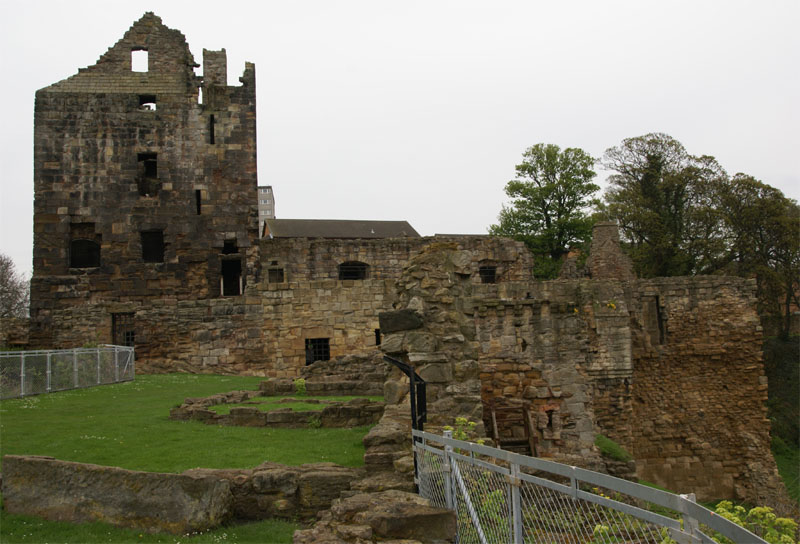
The ruins of Ravenscraig Castle

Castles that were either built by the Sinclairs or came into their possession have included amongst many others:

- Roslin Castle, also known as Rosslyn Castle in Midlothian, is considered the earliest seat of the Sinclairs in Scotland. The ruins show that it was once a large, strong, princely stronghold. The main tower is ruinous, but a range that dates from the sixteenth century is almost complete. The keep was probably built by Sir William Sinclair who set out on a crusade with Robert the Bruce and was killed fighting the Moors in Granada in 1330. Roslin Castle was sacked and torched in 1544 by the Earl of Hertford. In 1650 it was attacked again by George Monck, 1st Duke of Albemarle during Oliver Cromwell's invasion. The castle was damaged by a mob of Covenanters in 1688. The castle is now owned by the Sinclair-Erskine family. The Sinclairs also built the famed Rosslyn Chapel nearby.
- Castle Sinclair Girnigoe, near Wick, Caithness was once thought of as two castles: Castle Sinclair and Castle Girnigoe, however later theories are that it was one large fortress. There is not much left of the part that is known as Castle Sinclair, but the Castle Girnigoe part is a substantial ruin that rises five stories on a cliff above the sea. The castle was damaged by the Clan Campbell when it was attacked after the Battle of Altimarlech in 1681. The castle is now in the care of the Clan Sinclair Trust.
- Castle of Mey, 7 miles (11 km) north-east of Castletown, Caithness is a Z-plan tower house that rises six stories and dates from the sixteenth century. The castle was property of the Sinclair Earls of Caithness from 1566 and they built the castle. William Sinclair, son of George Sinclair of Mey, while a student at Edinburgh High School in 1595, shot and killed Bailie MacMorran in a siege at the school. MacLeod of Assynt who betrayed James Graham, 1st Marquess of Montrose was later imprisoned in the castle. In 1952 the castle was sold to Queen Elizabeth The Queen Mother who had it restored.
- Ravenscraig Castle, in Kirkcaldy dates from the fifteenth century and is one of the first castles in Britain to have been built for both defensive and offensive artillery use. The Sinclairs received Ravenscraig after they resigned the Earldom of Orkney. They owned it until 1650 and it was the Sinclairs who completed the castle. The property later passed to the Sinclair-Erskine family and is now in the care of Historic Scotland who have opened it to the public.
- Ackergill Tower, near Wick, Caithness, was seized by the Sinclairs in 1547 but later returned to the Clan Keith. It was acquired by the Sinclairs again in 1612.
- Braal Castle, near Thurso, Caithness, is a ruinous castle that passed to the Sinclair Earls of Caithness by 1547 and then went to the Sinclairs of Ulbster.
- Dunbeath Castle, near Dunbeath, Caithness, was acquired by the Sinclairs in the 15th century.
- Keiss Castle, near Wick, Caithness, the original castle of which was held by the Sinclairs of Keiss until they abandoned it for new Keiss Castle in 1755. The old castle is now dangerously ruined.
- Castle of Old Wick, near Wick, Caithness. During a feud between the Clan Sutherland and Clan Sinclair the castle was starved into submission by John Sinclair, Master of Caithness in 1595. It is now in the care of Historic Scotland.
- Thurso Castle, near Thurso, Caithness is a ruinous mansion on the site of a castle. It was held by the Sinclairs of Greenland and Rattar in 1612. Thurso Castle was the home of Sir John Sinclair, 1st Baronet of Ulbster who compiled the Statistical Account of Scotland and who died in 1835. This line of Sinclairs had been made Baronets in 1786 and Viscounts Thurso in 1952, and they still live in Caithness.

== Clan profile ==
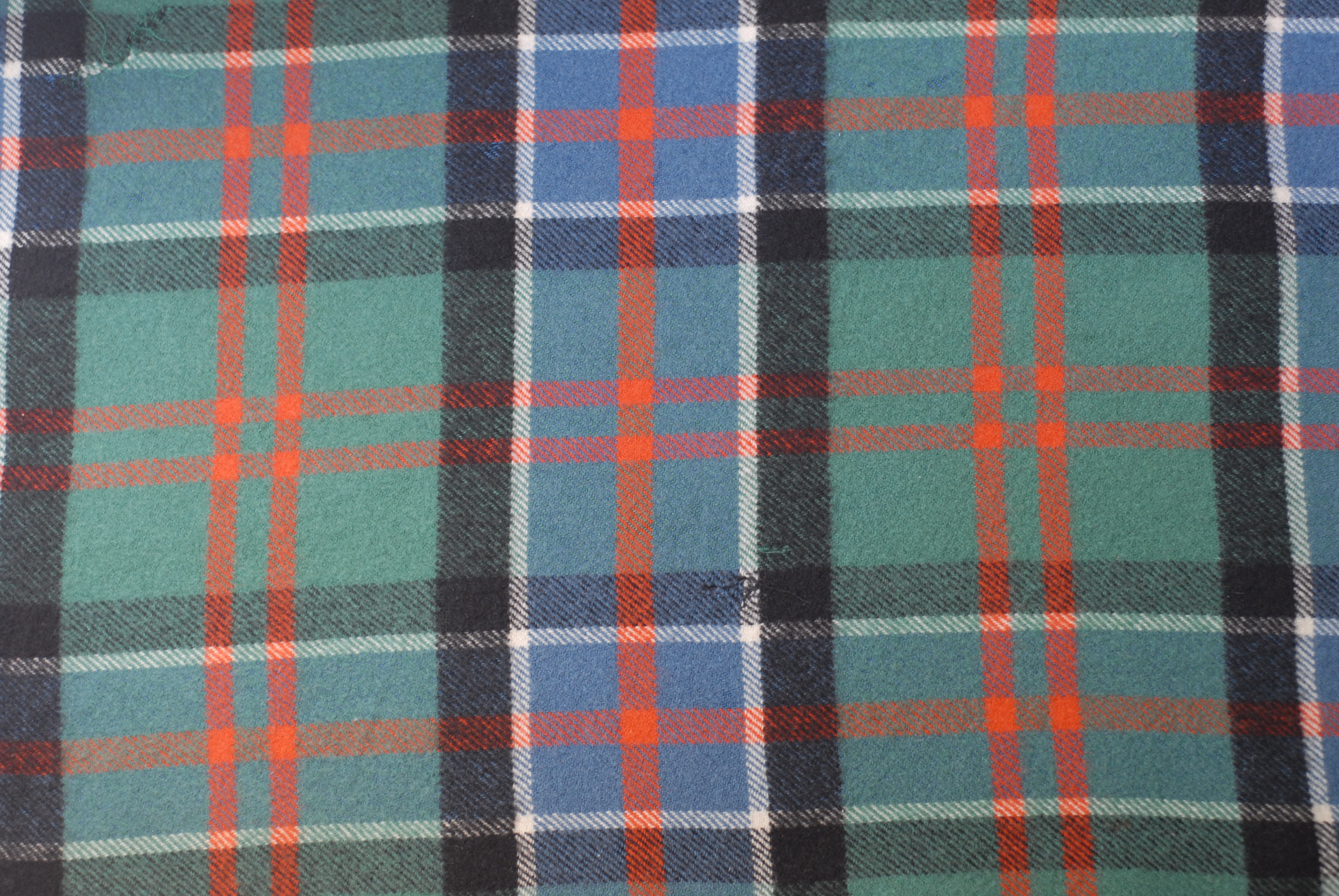
Sinclair hunting tartan (ancient)

- Clan Chief: Malcolm Ian Sinclair, 20th Earl of Caithness
- Crest badge: Note: the crest badge is made up of the chief's heraldic crest and motto,
- Chief's motto: "Commit thy work to God" (sometimes styled as Latin: "Revela Domino opera tua")
- Chief's crest: A cock rampant
- Clan plant badge: Whin
- Lands: Midlothian, Orkney and Caithness
- Gaelic Name: Mac na Ceardadh
- Origin of Name: Placename, French: "de Sancto Claro"
- Pipe Music: "Spaidsearachd Mhic nan Cearda" ("The Sinclair's March")

== See also ==
- Earl of Rosslyn
