= Adam Hepburn =

Adam Hepburn may refer to:

- Adam Hepburn, Master of Hailes (died 1479), Scottish nobleman
- Adam Hepburn of Craggis (died 1513), Scottish nobleman
- Adam Hepburn, 2nd Earl of Bothwell (died 1513), Scottish nobleman
- Adam Hepburn, Lord Humbie (died 1656), Scottish judge, politician and soldier
