= Battle of Summerdale =

1529 battle in Scotland

- Part of Rebellion of the Orkney Sinclairs
- Flags of Caithness and Orkney
Date	19 May 1529
Location	boundary of the parishes of Orphir and Stenness in Mainland, Orkney, Scotland. 58°58′37.6″N 03°08′25.8″W
Result	Victory for Orkney Sinclairs

Belligerents
Clan Sinclair of Caithness (supporters of James V of Scotland)	Sinclairs of Orkney; Orcadians

Commanders and leaders
John Sinclair, 3rd Earl of Caithness †; William Sinclair, 5th Lord Sinclair	James Sinclair, Governor of Orkney

Casualties and losses
500 men killed including the Earl of Caithness; William Sinclair, 5th Lord Sinclair and others taken prisoner	One killed

The Battle of Summerdale (also called the Battle of Bigswell) was fought on 19 May 1529, (Note: The battle was said to have been fought in 1527 by Jo Ben's Descriptio Insularum Orchadiarum, which claims to have been written in 1529. Both the year of composition and 1527 as the date of the battle are disputed by Roland William Saint-Clair, on internal textual evidence.) and was the last battle to take place on Orkney soil. The battle took place on the boundary of the parishes of Orphir and Stenness in Mainland, Orkney (several miles west of Kirkwall). The battle was fought between the Sinclairs of Orkney and Shetland and the Sinclairs of Caithness, who had the support of James V, King of Scotland.

== History ==
The Orkney Islands came under Scottish rule in 1468, and the former Earldom was rented out to tacksmen. These tacksmen collected rent, taxes and other fees from the Orcadians, and abused their powers. The tacksman in 1489 was Henry Sinclair, 4th Lord Sinclair, and the property and responsibility passed down the Sinclair line. The Sinclair family made up the nobility within Orkney, but they were divided in their loyalty. Some Sinclairs, such as William Sinclair, 5th Lord Sinclair, were loyal to the Scottish crown and others such as James Sinclair, feared the control of Scotland in Orkney, and rebelled against the encroaching crown and eventually refused to pay their dues to the tacksman. The loyal Sinclairs were pushed out of Orkney to Caithness during a rebellion in which James Sinclair took over Kirkwall Castle. After many negotiations, James V of Scotland sent the Caithness Sinclairs to fight against the Sinclairs of Orkney in order to win back control of the Orkney Islands. The Caithness Sinclairs were all slain apart from one man, and only one Orcadian boy was killed. According to Roland Saint-Clair, John Sinclair, 3rd Earl of Caithness was killed with 500 men, and William Sinclair, 5th Lord Sinclair and others were taken prisoner.

== The supernatural ==
It has been said that upon landing at Orphir, William Sinclair of Caithness encountered a witch. This witch unwound two balls of wool as they marched, one red and one blue. The red ball ran out first and the witch informed William Sinclair that this meant the side whose blood was spilt first would be defeated. Sinclair supposedly put great faith in the prophecy, and decided to kill the first Orcadian they came across. Seeing a boy herding cattle, William Sinclair ordered his men to kill him, but once the boy was dead, he was recognised as a native of Caithness who had taken refuge in Orkney some time before. Tradition has it that this unnerved them, and contributed to their subsequent defeat.

On the other hand, the Orcadians were said to be supported by the Christian Saint Magnus. Saint Magnus is said to have appeared on the field of battle to assist the Orkneymen.

In another tradition, the land where the battle was fought was said to have been smooth grass without stones until the day of the battle. However, that morning so many stones had appeared that the Orcadians dropped the pitchforks they were armed with and threw these stones at the oncoming Caithness men, preventing them from getting close enough to attack and eventually forcing them to flee, with the Orcadians in close pursuit.

== After the battle ==
James Sinclair was pardoned completely by James V, despite his blatant rebellion. Romantic historians believe this was because James V feared losing Orkney to Norway and Denmark.

Mounds in the area of the battle are said to be the graves of the fallen Caithnessmen, though George Barry refuted this on the grounds of their antiquity. Barry, writing in 1805, also noted that bodies had been very recently discovered in the adjacent marsh, which the Caithness men had been pursued through before the battle, with their clothes surviving in a remarkably well preserved condition. An excavation of one of the mounds by F. G. Wainwright in 1960 showed a disturbance of the contents, which was concluded to indicate a previous excavation "in search of treasure or information", but did not rule out the possibility it was to inter the bodies of the Caithnessmen.

Communication between the Orcadians and people of Caithness completely broke down after the battle, and animosity between the two persisted for over three centuries after this.
