= John Sinclair, 3rd Earl of Caithness =

Scottish nobleman

John Sinclair
- Earl of Caithness
- Earl of Caithness Coat of Arms
- Predecessor: William Sinclair, 2nd Earl of Caithness
- Successor: George Sinclair, 4th Earl of Caithness
- Died: 1529
- Noble family: Clan Sinclair
- Father: William Sinclair, 2nd Earl of Caithness
- Mother: Margaret Keith

John Sinclair (died 1529) was a Scottish nobleman, 3rd Earl of Caithness and chief of the Clan Sinclair, a Scottish clan of the Scottish Highlands.

== Early life ==
He was the son of William Sinclair, 2nd Earl of Caithness and Margaret, daughter of Sir Gilbert Keith of Inverugie. His father had been killed at the Battle of Flodden in 1513.

== Earl of Caithness ==
Soon after Flodden, Adam Gordon, Earl of Sutherland and husband of Elizabeth Sutherland, 10th Countess of Sutherland, made overtures to John Sinclair, 3rd Earl of Caithness in anticipation of dangers in the North, and they entered into a bond of friendship for mutual alliance and support. This included an exchange of lands. John Sinclair, 3rd Earl of Caithness had sasine of the earldom on 24 November 1513. He received a charter from the Crown for himself and his wife Elizabeth Sutherland of Duffus that was dated 14 July 1527 for the lands of Keiss, Stane, and Rowdale in the earldom of Caithness and sheriffdom of Inverness. This charter also granted to William Sinclair, the earl's son and heir apparent, the earldom of Caithness under reservation of his father's life-rent, and his spouse's reasonable terce. On 18 July 1527, the earl received a charter for the lands of Greeneland and Wester Clyth in Caithness. A bond of "manhood" was entered into by John Sinclair, 3rd Earl of Caithness and William Sinclair, 5th Lord Sinclair dated 15 February 1528–29.

The Earl of Caithness and Earl of Sutherland later came into continuous opposition with each other and eventually Sutherland brought a case before the Lords of Council and Session to recover his lands. Gavin Dunbar, Bishop of Aberdeen pronounced his decision at Edinburgh on 24 March 1524, and both parties were satisfied and the two Earls lived in peace with each other from then onward. In 1528, the Earl of Caithness was one of those included in James V of Scotland's proposed extirpation of the "Kin of Clanquhattane" (Clan Chattan), although nothings seems to have been done about that troublesome clan. This was during the time of William Mackintosh, 15th of Mackintosh who was chief of the confederation of Clan Chattan.

John Sinclair, 3rd Earl of Caithness was killed in an expedition to Orkney in 1529. In 1528-29 there had been insurrection led by the brothers James Sinclair and Edward Sinclair who were from the Orkney Isles against William, Lord Sinclair who himself had wasted Orkney and Shetland the previous year. According to Roland Saint-Clair there had been a formidable but abortive attempt to separate the Orkneys from the dominion of the Crown. There had been great cruelties practiced by both sides. The Earl of Caithness coming to the aid of his kinsmen was slain with many of his followers at the Battle of Summerdale on 18 May 1529. The Earl of Caithness had been the author of this rebellion but in the battle his insurgents were encountered by James Sinclair, the Governor of Orkney, who defeated Caithness, killing him and five-hundred of his men.

== Family ==
He had married Elizabeth, daughter of William Sutherland, 5th of Duffus, and had the following children:

1. William Sinclair, Master of Caithness who died in 1527 without issue.
2. George Sinclair, 4th Earl of Caithness, heir and successor.
3. Janet Sinclair, married to Alexander Ross of Balnagown.
4. David Sinclair, a natural (illegitimate) son who was Bailie to the Bishop of Caithness. His elder brother George obtained a remission to imprison him in Castle Sinclair Girnigoe. David is also believed to have been the paternal ancestor of the noble Sinclair of Dun and Forss families. His wife was Margaret Calder, heiress of Dun, with whom he had the children: John the heir of Dun, William of Forss, Alexander, Henry, John the Archdeacon of Caithness, George and Donald.

== See also ==
- Barony of Roslin
- Lord Sinclair
- Lord Herdmanston

Peerage of Scotland
Preceded by William Sinclair	Earl of Caithness; 1513–1529	Succeeded by George Sinclair
