= Elizabeth Sinclair (courtier) =

Elizabeth Sinclair was a servant of Margaret Tudor (1489–1541), the wife of James IV of Scotland.

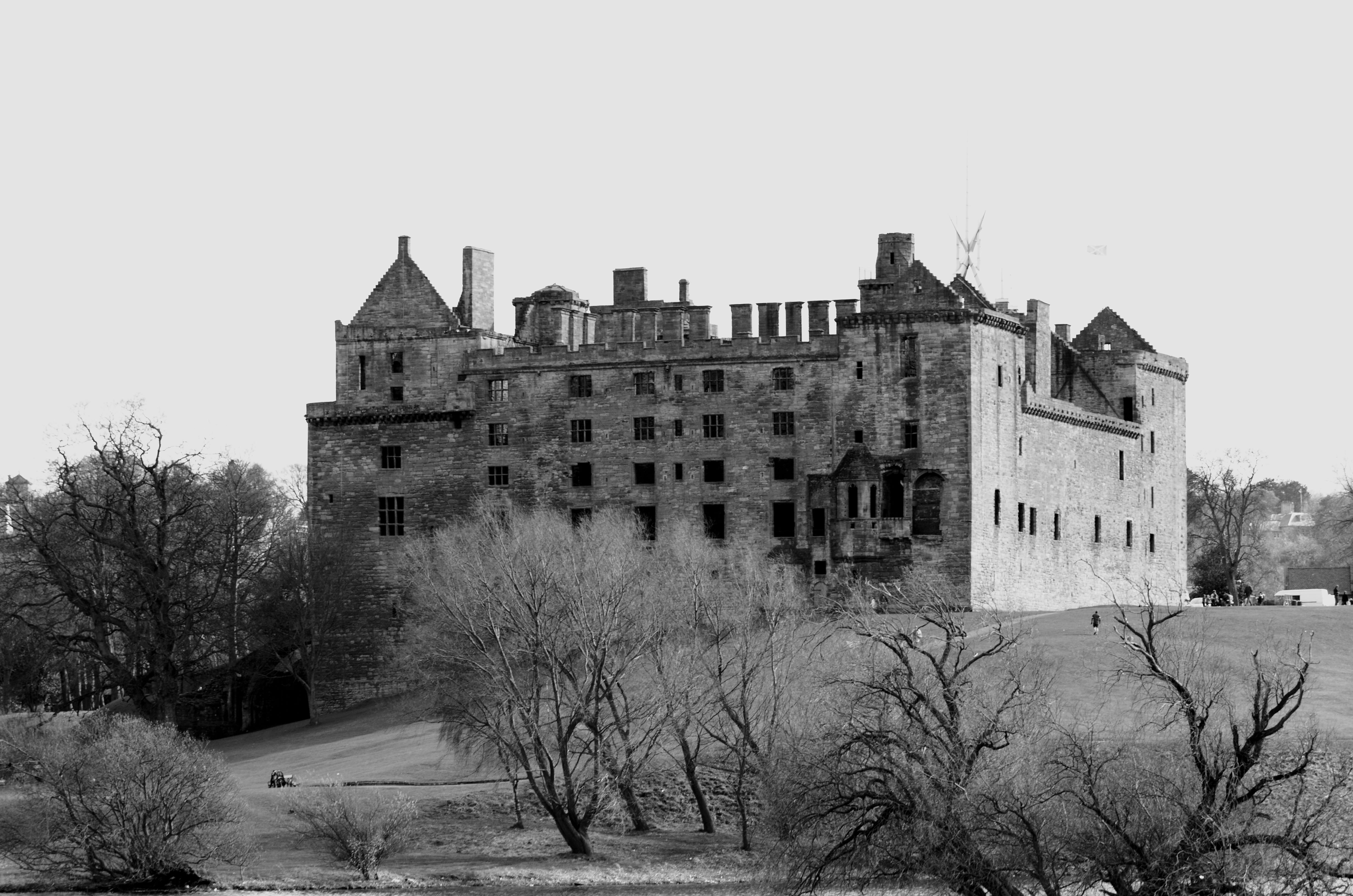
The Queen's servants and gentlewomen received gifts at Linlithgow Palace on New Year's Day

== Family ==
She was either a daughter of William Sinclair, 3rd Lord Sinclair (died 1487) and Christian Leslie, or a daughter of Henry Sinclair, 4th Lord Sinclair (died 1513) and Margaret Hepburn. The royal treasurer's accounts describe her as Lord Sinclair's daughter.

== Life at court ==
Gift giving on New Year's Day was highly ritualised. Elizabeth Sinclair was at court on New Year's Day 1512 at Linlithgow Palace, and was given a gift of a gold chain worth £7-4s Scots, Christian Ray's gift was worth £7, Ellen More received £3-10s. In January 1513 Sinclair got 10 French gold crowns, and Ellen and Margaret More had ten gold crowns between them. Eight ladies of the Queen's bedchamber (presumably including Sinclair) were given gold rings, made by John Aitkin in his workshop at Stirling Castle.

In February 1512 Elizabeth Sinclair, was given as a reward for her services to the king and queen the right to marry Walter Drummond (died 1518), the heir of John, Lord Drummond, or to sell this right to another. Walter Drummond married Elizabeth Graham, a daughter of William Graham, 1st Earl of Montrose in 1513 and Sinclair may have gained the "profit" of his marriage.

== Lands ==
Margaret Tudor gained control of her son James V (1512-1542) and was Regent of Scotland in the summer of 1524. She was able to grant offices and reward her followers. On 29 August 1524 Margaret Tudor rewarded Sinclair for her service with the income from farms in her dower lands at Cessintully near Thornhill, including a property called McCorolstoun. Sinclair also received an income from a part of the queen's lands at Cornton. Christian Ray had a liferent income from the Newtown of Doune. All these lands are in Stirlingshire.

== Marriage ==
By 1540, Elizabeth Sinclair was married to Bartholomew or Bartilmo Balfour. Women in early modern Scotland did not use their husband's surnames after marriage. Bartholomew Balfour had been appointed as a squire and gentleman in the household of James V in 1524.

Bartholomew Balfour participated in a feud concerning the Queen's lands in Menteith in 1529. He sided with James Stewart, Captain of Doune Castle against William Edmonstone of Duntreath. In a court case, Henry Stewart, 1st Lord Methven, brother of the Captain of Doune, a member of the king's household since 1524, and now married to Margaret Tudor, spoke on behalf of Balfour.

Their son was probably Bartholmew Balfour (died 1547), who was killed at the battle of Pinkie. Called the "Laird of MacKarestowne" in Menteith, after the property gifted to his mother, he married Margaret Drummond, a daughter of Alexander Drummond of Carnock. Their children included Henry and Bartholomew Balfour, commanders of Scots troops in the Netherlands.
