= Castle Sinclair Girnigoe =

Historic castle in Caithness, Scotland

- Wick, Caithness in Scotland

Site information
- Type: L-plan tower house with numerous extensions
- Owner: Clan Sinclair Trust
- Open to the public: Yes
- Condition: Ruined

Location
- Coordinates: 58.478014°N 3.068082°W

Site history
- Built: 1476–1496
- In use: 15th century to 17th century
- Materials: Flagstone, Lime mortar

Scheduled monument
- Official name: Castle Girnigoe and Castle Sinclair
- Type: Secular castle
- Designated: 8 March 1935
- Reference no.: SM622

Castle Sinclair Girnigoe, separately known as Castle Sinclair and Castle Girnigoe, are the ruins of two historic castles, near Wick on the east coast of Caithness.

The castles are considered to be the earliest seats of Clan Sinclair. The first castle, Girnigoe, was built in the 15th century and the second, Sinclair, was built in the 17th century.

Collectively, they are designated as a scheduled monument.

== History ==
The earlier Castle Girnigoe was built by William Sinclair, 2nd Earl of Caithness, probably sometime between 1476 and 1496, but certainly before his death at the Battle of Flodden in 1513. There is some evidence to suggest that the castle was built on the foundations of an earlier fortalice.

Olave Sinclair, the foud of Shetland, was brought to Girnigoe in May 1573, paralysed after a stroke. In 1577, George Sinclair, 4th Earl of Caithness, imprisoned his own son John Sinclair, Master of Caithness, in Castle Girnigoe, on suspicion of rebelling against his rule. He was held there for seven years, after which his father fed him a diet of salted beef, with nothing to drink, so that he eventually died insane from thirst. The rebel Earl of Bothwell was at Girnigoe in December 1594.

Expansion occurred in 1606 when Castle Sinclair was built, comprising a gatehouse and other buildings, along with a curtain wall. These were connected to the earlier castle by a drawbridge over a ravine. The same year George Sinclair, 5th Earl of Caithness, requested the Scottish Parliament to change the name to Castle Sinclair, but because the names Castle Sinclair and Castle Girnigoe were both written down in 1700, both names have been in use since.

Robert Sinclair describes Girnigoe as "an adapted 5-storey L-plan crow-stepped gabled tower house, which sat upon a rocky promontory jutting out into Sinclair Bay.

In 1672, George Sinclair, 6th Earl of Caithness, was in heavy debt to his fourth cousin, John Campbell of Glenorchy, and transferred the castle to Campbell as payment. When Sinclair died four years later with no heir, Campbell claimed the title Earl of Caithness and married Sinclair's widow. However, Sinclair's first cousin, George Sinclair of Keiss, challenged Campbell's title. This resulted in the Battle of Altimarlach in which Campbell defeated Sinclair in 1680. Glenorchy and some of his troops remained in Caithness for some time and levied rents and taxes on the people, subjecting them to the most grievous oppression. He sent the remainder home immediately after the battle. However, George Sinclair of Keiss continued his opposition and laid siege, with firearms and artillery, to Castle Sinclair Girnigoe which he took after feeble resistance from the garrison. As a result, he and his three friends who had assisted him, Sinclair of Broynach, Sinclair of Thura and Mackay of Strathnaver were declared rebels. The political current having turned in favor of Sinclair of Keiss however, this was quashed. Having failed to regain his inheritance by force, Sinclair of Keiss then turned to the law. Through the influence of the Duke of York and afterwards James II, he took his place as 7th Earl of Caithness on 15 July 1681, and his lands were restored on 23 September. Campbell of Glenorchy was made Earl of Breadalbane by way of compensation.

== Preservation ==
Since 1998 the Clan Sinclair Trust has been carrying out archaeological research in the castle and are also seeking to preserve the castle. The castle is the only castle in Scotland which is listed by the World Monuments Fund.

== Image gallery ==
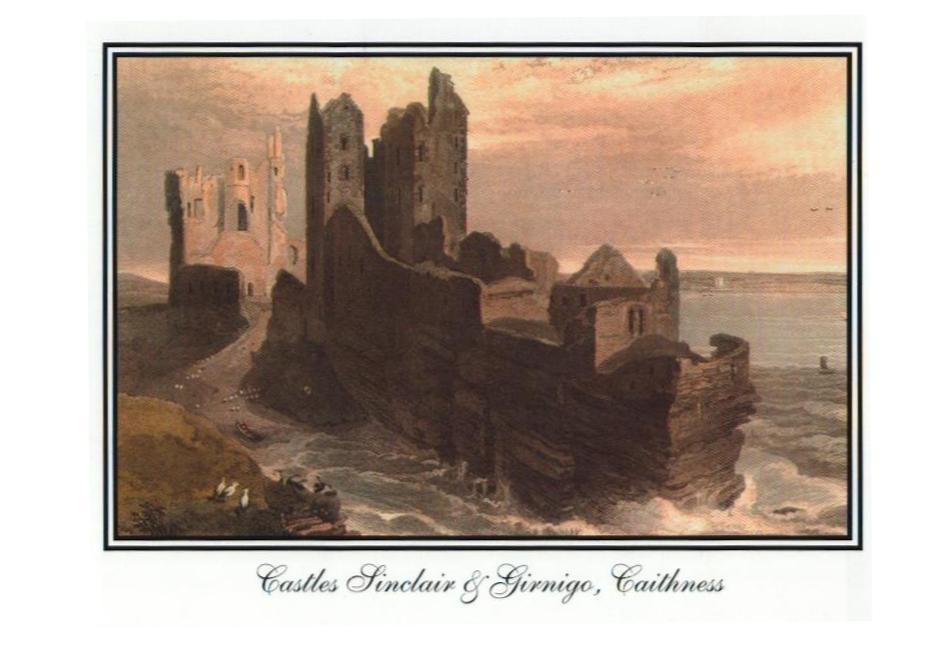
Castle Sinclair Girnigoe drawn in 1821

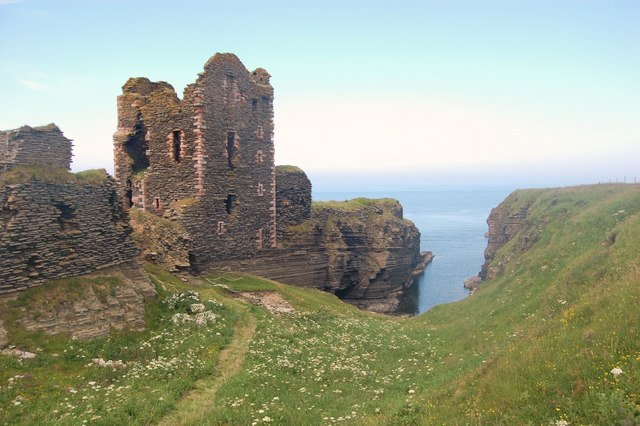
Castle Sinclair Girnigoe

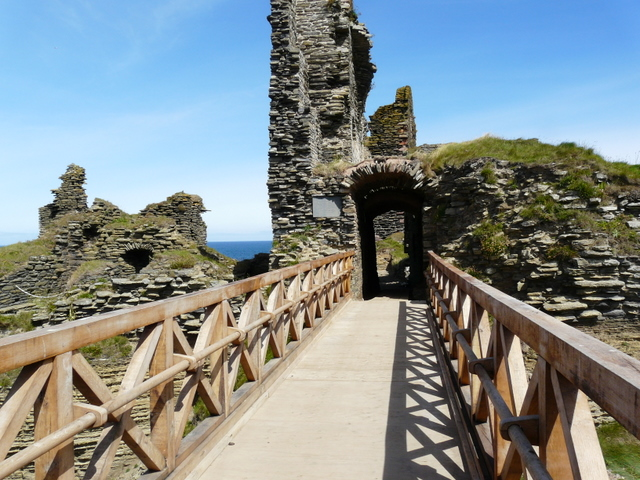
Footbridge giving access into Castle Sinclair Girnigoe

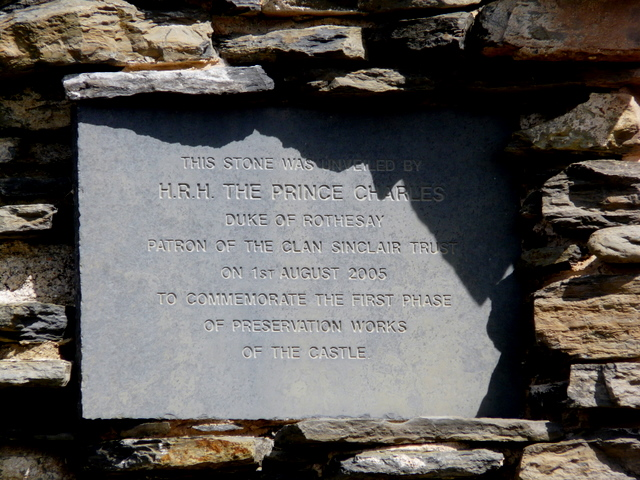
Plaque unveiled by the Duke of Rothesay (now Charles III) as patron of the Clan Sinclair Trust

== See also ==
- Battle of Champions – fought just west of the castle in 1478 or 1464
- Castle of Mey
- Roslin Castle
- Rosslyn Chapel
- Sinclair (surname)
