= William Sinclair, 2nd Earl of Caithness =

Scottish nobleman

William Sinclair
- Earl of Caithness
- Earl of Caithness Coat of Arms
- Predecessor: William Sinclair, Earl of Orkney and 1st Earl of Caithness
- Successor: John Sinclair, 3rd Earl of Caithness
- Born: c. 1459
- Died: 9 September 1513
- Noble family: Clan Sinclair
- Father: William Sinclair, Earl of Orkney and 1st Earl of Caithness
- Mother: Marjory Sutherland

William Sinclair (c. 1459 – 9 September 1513) was a Scottish nobleman, the 2nd Earl of Caithness and chief of the Clan Sinclair, a Scottish clan of the Scottish Highlands.

== Early life ==
William Sinclair, 2nd Earl of Caithness was born at Ravenscraig Castle, Kirkcaldy, Scotland second son to William Sinclair, 1st Earl of Caithness and Marjory Sutherland, daughter of Sir Alexander Sutherland of Dunbeath.

== Earl of Caithness ==
William Sinclair received a charter from James III of Scotland that was dated 7 December 1476 for the Earldom of Caithness to be held by him and his heirs. This included the patronage of the Hospital of Saint Magnus at Spittal and this was followed in 1480 by a charter for the jurisdiction. The earl allied himself to the royal cause during the rebellion of 1488 which was headed by James III of Scotland's own son. The earl is party to a charter for the lands of Caithness that was executed at Castle Sinclair Girnigoe and dated 14 March 1496. He is also on a charter for land in "Hjaltland" (Shetland) which was dated at Edinburgh on 3 December 1498. There is a remission cited as being made by George Hepburn who was Bishop of the Isles from 1510 to 1513, in favour of William, Earl of Caithness for all "Murders and crimes", which according to Roland Saint-Clair must mean incidents of disputed administration, feuds and property quarrels, and not personal felony. William, Earl of Caithness resided at Castle Sinclair Girnigoe which was situated on a projecting rock near Noss Head on the east side of Sinclairs Bay and it is now only ruins. In 1505, he sat in the Scottish Parliament. He also accompanied James IV of Scotland at the Battle of Flodden against the English army on 9 September 1513, where both of them were killed.

== Family ==
He married Margaret Keith, daughter of Sir William Keith, 4th of Inverugie, who also resided at Ackergill Tower which was a very strong keep at the most inland part of Sinclairs Bay, about two miles north of Castle Sinclair Girnigoe They had the following children:

1. John Sinclair, 3rd Earl of Caithness (d. 1529), married Elizabeth Sutherland (d. 1527).
2. Alexander Sinclair of Stempster, whose daughter Helen married Donald Mackay, 11th of Strathnaver. He was the ancestor of the Sinclairs of Dunbeath.
3. William Sinclair, a natural (illegitimate) son.

Caithness may have had another child, Margaret, according to some sources. Dame Margaret Sinclair, according to these sources, married Sir Thomas Kirkpatrick. They had no children.

== See also ==
- Barony of Roslin
- Lord Sinclair
- Lord Herdmanston

Peerage of Scotland
Preceded by William Sinclair	Earl of Caithness; 1476–1513	Succeeded by John Sinclair
