= Thurso East =

Coastline in northern Scotland

Coordinates: 58°35′57″N 3°30′37″W

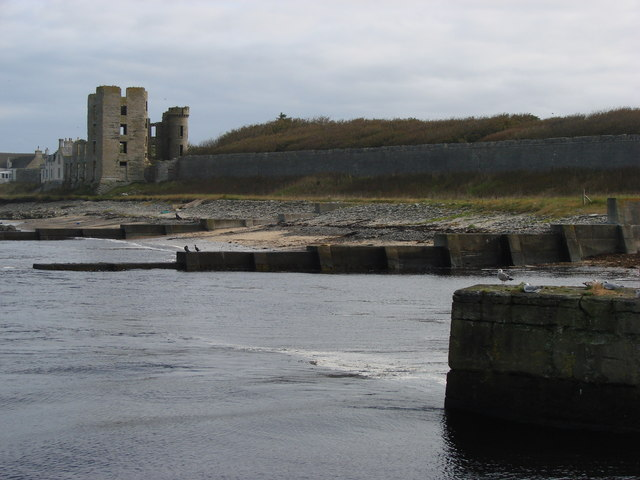
Thurso Castle

Thurso East (alternatively, the North Shore) is a coastline section of the Atlantic 0.5 miles (0.80 km) east of Thurso, Caithness, northern Scotland. It is situated at the mouth of the River Thurso, overlooked by the remains of Thurso Castle. The reef is made of layers of Caithness flagstone (the same stone that paves the Strand and much of Paris). It is Scotland's prime surfing venue on the north coast.

== Surfing ==
Thurso East is a fast reef break and has hosted many international competitions. The reef holds swell from 2 feet (0.61 m) upwards of 15 feet (4.6 m) and is primarily a long walling right-hander with several barrel sections depending on tide and swell direction. Thurso East came into the spotlight in 2006 when it was used to host the inaugural O'Neill Highland Open WQS surfing competition. The event was won by British surfer Russell Winter. From 2006 to 2011 O’Neill sponsored an international surf contest at this location which was latterly called the Coldwater Classic and the event regularly attracted big name surfers. In 2012 O'Neill announced that it wouldn't be renewing their sponsorship deal, in order to direct resources elsewhere.

== See also ==
Glossary of surfing
