= Battle of Altimarlach =

1680 battle in Scotland

- Part of the Scottish clan wars
- Coats of Arms of Campbell, Earl of Breadalbane (left) and Sinclair, Earl of Caithness (right)
Date	13 July 1680
Location	Altimarlach Burn, near Wick, Caithness, Scotland 58.456°N 3.147°W
Result	Campbell Victory

Belligerents
Clan Campbell and Clan MacNab	Clan Sinclair

Commanders and leaders
Sir John Campbell of Glenorchy	George Sinclair of Keiss

Strength
Accounts vary from 700 to 1100 men	Accounts vary from 400 to 1,500 men

Casualties and losses
Very low	Accounts vary from 80 to 200 men killed

The Battle of Altimarlach was a Scottish clan battle that took place on 13 July 1680, near Wick, Caithness, Scotland. It was fought in a dispute between Sir John Campbell of Glenorchy and George Sinclair of Keiss over who had the right to the title and lands of the Earl of Caithness. The battle was fought between men of the Clan Campbell and Clan Sinclair. Campbell of Glenorchy won a decisive victory in the battle, but Sinclair of Keiss later turned to the law and was awarded the title of Earl of Caithness.

== Background ==
According to James Tait Calder, George Sinclair, 6th Earl of Caithness, had sometime before his death in 1675 (or 1676) sold his estates to John Campbell, Lord Glenorchy, who was one of his principal creditors. According to William Anderson, in 1672, debt forced George Sinclair, 6th Earl of Caithness, to resign his titles and estates in favour of Sir John Campbell. Glenorchy married Caithness's widow, the Countess Dowager, who was also a daughter of Campbell, Earl of Argyll who in turn was a relation of Campbell of Glenorchy. Glenorchy then assumed the title of Earl of Caithness. However, according to Anderson, Glenorchy took possession of the estates on Sinclair's death in May 1676 and was created Earl of Caithness in June the following year. Glenorchy appointed Sir John Sinclair of Murkle as sheriff and justicary-depute of Caithness, as well as bailie of all the baronies on the Caithness estate, to secure an influential friend in the county. George Sinclair of Keiss, son of Francis Sinclair of Northfield, disputed Glenorchy's right to the title and especially to the lands of Northfield and Tister, which he had inherited from his father. According to Anderson, George Sinclair of Keiss disputed the claim and seized the land in 1678.

The claims of both were submitted to the four most eminent lawyers in Scotland at the time: Sir George Mackenzie of Rosehaugh, Sir Robert Sinclair of Longformacus, Sir George Lockhart, Lord Carnwath and Sir John Cunningham, 1st Baronet. They decided in favour of Glenorchy and forwarded their decision to King James VII of Scotland, who then sent a letter to the Privy Council of Scotland that ordered it to issue a proclamation prohibiting George Sinclair of Kess from assuming the title of Earl of Caithness. However, Sinclair of Keiss paid no attention to that and not only retained possession of the lands, which he claimed by his own inheritance, but also annoyed Glenorchy's chamberlains so much that they found it extremely difficult to collect the rents. Almost all of the gentlemen in the county supported the cause of Sinclair of Keiss, in particular David Sinclair of Broynach and William Sinclair of Thura. They gave him all the aid in their power and even helped him to demolish the castle of Thurso East of which Glenorchy had taken possession. The common people were also friendly towards Sinclair of Keiss, and Glenorchy was looked upon as an usurper who had taken advantage of the necessities of the late Earl and cheated him out of his title and property.

The Privy Council passed an Act on 11 November 1679, charging "haill kin, friends and followers of John, Earl of Caithness, to concuurr and assist" in recovering the lands that were in dispute.

== Battle ==
According to Calder, the following summer, in 1680, Glenorchy invaded Caithness with 700 men. According to Anderson, Glenorchy had taken a force of 800 men north on 13 July 1680 to evict Sinclair of Keiss, who was waiting for him with 500 men near Wick, Caithness. However, according to David Stewart of Garth, Glenorchy's force consisted of 1100 men which included the immediate descendants of his family; the Campbells of Glenlyon, Glenfalloch, Glendochart and Achallader, together with those of his neighbour and brother-in-law, the Laird of Macnab. According to Thomas Sinclair, Glenorchy set off from Taymouth Castle in Perthshire for Caithness with 500 well-armed men. Sinclair of Keiss, upon hearing that the Campbells were passing through Braemore, which is on the confines of the county, resolved to meet them in open field. The New Statistical Account of Scotland states that Sinclair had collected a force of 400 men. According to Calder, Sinclair collected about 800 followers but that some accounts say that he had 1500. Many of Sinclair's men, however, were old, untrained and totally destitute of any knowledge of military tactics. According to Thomas Sinclair, the only man to have known anything of discipline or to have seen any real service was Major Sinclair of Thura, who had served abroad during the Thirty Years' War.

The two sides met near Stirkoke, but Glenorchy's men were fatigued with having marched nearly thirty miles and so he declined to enter into battle and withdrew to the hills of Yarrows. The Sinclairs marched to Wick and celebrated their supposed advantage, it is said, with drink that had been supplied by a secret agent of the Campbells. The following morning, on 13 July 1680, Glenorchy crossed the river of Wick below Sibster, nearly opposite Stirkoke Mains. The Sinclairs mustered with great difficulty and hastily led up the riverside to meet the enemy. Major Sinclair of Thura had advised in deferring the engagement until the ensuing day when the men would have recovered from the effects of the drink and would have gone fresh and prepared into action, but he was overruled.

Glenorchy had originally intended to march to Keiss, but seeing the Sinclairs advancing, he prepared for battle by drawing up 500 of his men 200 yards up the river, where it is joined by the burn of Altimarlach. Glenorchy ordered the remainder of his men to lie down and conceal themselves in a deep gorge and not to move from that spot until their officers told them to. That force was not seen by the advancing Sinclairs. Major Sinclair strongly recommended for his countrymen to allow the Campbells to begin crossing the ravine so that they could fall upon them when they were scrambling up the steep banks, but they ignored him and instantly began crossing the burn in a tumultuous manner. As a result, Major Sinclair found that they had put themselves in the situation which he had wished to have placed on the Campbells. When the two forces were within a few yards of each other, Glenorchy ordered his men to attack, and the onset of the Campbells was so furious that the Sinclairs, enfeebled from the drink of the previous evening, instantly gave way and fled in the direction of the burn of Altimarlach. At that moment, the reserve force of the Campbells arose from the gorge and ambushed them. The Sinclairs made a desperate rush for the river and the Campbells chased them into the water as they tried to escape. Many of them were drowned, and many others who tried to escape by running over the open plain were cut down by battle axes and broadswords.

Inflamed with drink, the Sinclairs had been routed, and legend has it that so many Sinclairs were killed that the Campbells were able to cross the river without getting their feet wet. According to Peter Campbell, 80 Sinclairs were killed in the battle. According to Ronald William Saint-Clair (Sinclair), as many as 200 "Caithnessmen" (Sinclairs) were reported to have fallen in the battle. Thomas Sinclair stated that the Hon. David Sinclair, Major Sinclair of Thura, with many other gentlemen, and a great number of inferior note fell in the action. According to John L. Roberts, writing in 2000, there were at least 107 Sinclairs killed in the battle.

== Aftermath ==
Glenorchy and some of his troops remained in Caithness for some time, levied rents and taxes on the people and subjected them to the most grievous oppression. He sent the remainder home immediately after the battle. However, George Sinclair of Keiss continued his opposition and laid siege, with firearms and artillery, to Castle Sinclair Girnigoe, which he took after feeble resistance from the garrison. As a result, he and his three friends who had assisted him, Sinclair of Broynach, Sinclair of Thura and Mackay of Strathnaver, were declared rebels. The political current having turned in favour of Sinclair of Keiss, however, that was quashed. Having failed to regain his inheritance by force, Sinclair of Keiss then turned to the law. Through the influence of the Duke of York, afterwards King James VII of Scotland, he took his place as Earl of Caithness on 15 July 1681, and his lands were restored on 23 September. Campbell of Glenorchy was made Earl of Breadalbane by way of compensation.

== The last clan battle ==
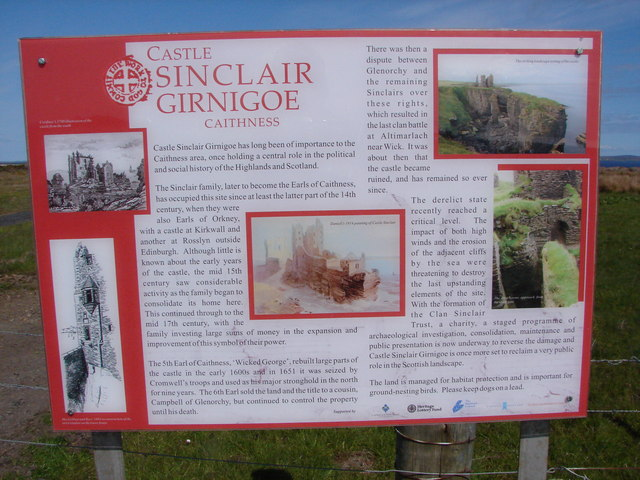
Information board at Castle Sinclair Girnigoe which states that the Battle of Altimarlach was the "last clan battle". However, the Battle of Mulroy which took place in 1688, between the Mackintoshes and Mackenzies against the MacDonalds and Camerons, is another contender as being the last of the private clan battles between Scottish clans

The Battle of Mulroy which was fought in 1688 between the Mackintoshes and MacDonalds is sometimes described as being the last of the private clan battles fought between Scottish clans. However, this is perhaps inaccurate as the Mackintoshes had official government support for their actions against the MacDonalds and their army was in part made up of government troops from an Independent Highland Company under Mackenzie of Suddie. This would therefore leave the Battle of Altimarlach, fought in 1680 between the Campbells and Sinclairs, as the last true clan battle.

== Pipe music ==
Men of the Clan MacIver of Argyll who were a sept of the Clan Campbell apparently joined up with the MacIvers of Caithness in support of Glenorchy and although only forming a small part of his force, contributed their full share to its success. According to tradition, the piper of the clan in Caithness, Finlay MacIver, composed the Great Highland bagpipe tune, Bodach-na-briogais, which was inspired by the battle. According to Hugh Fraser Campbell and Walter Biggar Blaikie, Glenorchy's piper, Findlay MacIver, had composed at this time the well known piping tune, The Campbells Are Coming. According to the New Statistical Account of Scotland, the tune The Braes of Glenorchy also obtained its name at this time.

== Ballad ==
A ballad commemorating the battle was published in 1861 by historian James Tait Calder:

The Battle of Altimarlach: A Ballad

'Twas morn; from rustic cot and grange
The cock's shrill clarion rung;
And fresh on every sweet wild flower
The pearly dew-drop hung.

Given up to thoughtless revelry,
In Wick lay Sinclair's band,
When suddenly the cry arose,
"Glenorchy's close at hand!"

For now the Campbell's haughty chief
The river Wick had crossed,
With twice seven hundred Highlanders
A fierce and lawless host.

"To arms! To arms!" from street to lane
The summons fast did go;
And forth the gathered Sinclairs marched
To meet the coming foe.

Where Altimarlach opens up
Its narrow, deep ravine,
Glenorchy's force, in order ranged,
Were strongly posted seen.

They meet, they close in deadly strife,
But brief the bloody fray;
Before the Campbell's furious charge
The Caithness ranks gave way.

Flushed with success, Glenorchy's men
Set up a savage cheer,
And drove the Sinclairs panic-struck
Into the river near.

There, 'neath the Cambell's ruthless blade
Fell more than on the plain,
Until the blood-dyed stream across
Was choked up with the slain.

But who might paint the flood of grief
That burst from young and old,
When to the slaughtered Sinclair's friends
The direful tale was told!

The shrieking mother wrung her hands,
The maiden tore her hair,
And ll was lamentation loud,
And terror, and despair.

Short time Glenorchy Caithness ruled,
By every rank abhorred;
He lost the title he usurped,
Then fled across the Ord.

While Keiss, who firm upheld his claim
Against tyrannic might,
Obtained the Sinclair's coronet
Which was his own by right;

The coronet which William wore,
Who loved his Prince so well,
And with his brave devoted band
On fatal Flodden fell.
