= Clan Sinclair Trust =

The Clan Sinclair Trust is a Scottish trust which was formed with the main objective of rescuing and preserving Castle Sinclair Girnigoe and of developing a visitor centre and library. Over the years, the Trust has raised substantial funds which have been spent on the castle including major works to stabilise the remaining building and on conducting major archaeological research which has resulted in highly important historical discoveries.

The Patron is Prince Charles, Duke of Rothesay. On 8 September 2022, the day that Queen Elizabeth II died, Prince Charles became King Charles III and remains Patron. The Chief Executive of the Clan Sinclair Trust is Sir Malcolm Sinclair, 20th Earl of Caithness and John Sinclair, 3rd Viscount Thurso and Euan Sinclair are trustees.

The Trust's 2006 Financial Statement reported that in April of that year "the Trust acquired Noss Head Estates Limited, a privately owned company" with a generous donation from Niven Sinclair and his cousin Sandi Sinclair Pershing from the US. The purchase was from Ian Sinclair and Joan Burton and comprised 35 acres of land at Noss Head, together with two houses and outbuildings. Ian Sinclair was to continue to live in the house on the land in life-rent with his partner Joan Burton and a lighthouse situated there remained the property of the Northern Lighthouse Board.

The Trust advised in 2009 that it hoped to establish a clan centre when funds permit. However, Ian Sinclair died in 2014 and in 2017 the site at Noss Head lighthouse was sold. Funds released by this sale augmented the reserves held by the Clan Sinclair Trust. Some of those funds were deployed so that the Castle Sinclair Girnigoe could be further stabilised from deterioration. In addition, access improvements were made so that it was and is safe for members of the public to visit the castle.

== See also ==
- Clan Sinclair
