= George Sinclair, 7th Earl of Caithness =

Scottish nobleman

George Sinclair
- Earl of Caithness
- Earl of Caithness Coat of Arms
- Predecessor: John Campbell
- Successor: John Sinclair, 8th Earl of Caithness
- Died: 1698
- Noble family: Clan Sinclair
- Father: Francis Sinclair of Northfield

George Sinclair, previously of Keiss, died 1698, was a Scottish nobleman, 7th Earl of Caithness and chief of the Clan Sinclair, a Scottish clan of the Scottish Highlands.

== Early life ==
George Sinclair of Keiss was the son of Francis Sinclair of Northfield, who in turn was a younger son of George Sinclair, 5th Earl of Caithness. His first cousin-once-removed was George Sinclair, 6th Earl of Caithness (d. 1676) who was the son of John Sinclair, Master of Berriedale and his wife Jean, daughter of Colin Mackenzie, 1st Earl of Seaforth. The 6th Earl of Caithness's paternal grandparents were William Sinclair, Lord Berriedale and Mary, daughter of Henry Sinclair, Lord Sinclair. William Sinclair, Lord Berriedale was in turn the elder son of George Sinclair, 5th Earl of Caithness.

== Dispute to the Earldom of Caithness ==
George Sinclair, 6th Earl of Caithness married Mary, daughter of Archibald Campbell, 1st Marquess of Argyll, but had no children. He died at Thurso Castle in 1676. The Earldom of Caithness being much in debt, he had transferred the estates and the title to his principal creditor, John Campbell of Glenorchy, who upon Sinclair's death was created Earl of Caithness by patent. This however was challenged by George Sinclair of Keiss. On 13 July 1680, Campbell of Glenorchy took a force of 800 men north to evict Sinclair of Keiss, who was waiting for him with 500 men near Wick. Inflamed with drink, the Sinclairs attacked the force of Campbells and were routed in what is known as the Battle of Altimarlach. Legend has it that so many Sinclairs were killed that the Campbells were able to cross the river without getting their feet wet. However, in 1681 the Privy Council of Scotland made a proclamation in favour of Sinclair of Keiss who became the 7th Earl of Caithness and Campbell of Glenorchy was created Earl of Breadalbane and Holland by way of compensation.

George Sinclair of Keiss, 7th Earl of Caithness died in 1698 without issue and this brought an end to the male heirs of the 5th Earl. The Earldom of Caithness then devolved upon the male heirs of James Sinclair, 1st of Murkle, who himself was a son of John Sinclair, Master of Caithness (d. 1576), who in turn was a son of George Sinclair, 4th Earl of Caithness (d. 1582). John Sinclair, eldest son of James Sinclair, 2nd of Murkle, then became the 8th Earl of Caithness.

== See also ==
- Barony of Roslin
- Lord Sinclair
- Lord Herdmanston

Peerage of Scotland
Preceded by John Campbell	Earl of Caithness; 1681–1698	Succeeded by John Sinclair
