= Henry I St Clair of Herdmanston =

12th-century Scottish noble

Henry St Clair
- Lord Herdmanston
- Successor: Alan St Clair
- Noble family: Clan Sinclair

Henry St Clair, Lord Herdmanston and Carfrae, was a Scottish noble of the 12th century.

Henry received a charter for the lands of Herdmanston, East Lothian from Richard de Morville, Constable of Scotland for whom he was Vicecomes. This was received in 1162 for military service and according to Roland Saint-Clair writing in the late 19th century, very few of the great Scottish families possessed a granted ancestral estate at such an early period. However, Herdmanston was not a large estate and must have been exposed to more powerful noble neighbors. Henry de St Clair appears as a witness in the Acts of the Scottish Parliament in 1180. From close association with the de Morville's it could be concluded that Henry de St Clair was from the same family as Hugh de St Clair who was ex-communicate with Hugh de Balliol and Hugh de Morville after they had opposed the tyranny of Thomas Becket the Archbishop of Canterbury. He is known to have been acting as the Sheriff of Lauderdale in 1189. Henry also received the barony of Carfrae, Lauderdale from William de Morville. According to The Scots Peerage by James Balfour Paul, he had a daughter named Ada who married Petrus de Haga of Bemersyde.

His heir was Alan de St Clair.

== See also ==
- Barony of Roslin
- Lord Sinclair
- Earl of Caithness
