= George Sinclair, 6th Earl of Caithness =

Scottish nobleman

George Sinclair
- Earl of Caithness
- Earl of Caithness Coat of Arms
- Predecessor: George Sinclair, 5th Earl of Caithness
- Successor: John Campbell
- Died: 1676
- Noble family: Clan Sinclair
- Father: John Sinclair, Master of Berriedale
- Mother: Jean Mackenzie

George Sinclair (died 1676) was a Scottish nobleman, 6th Earl of Caithness, and chief of the Clan Sinclair, a Scottish clan of the Scottish Highlands.

== Early life ==
George Sinclair, 6th Earl of Caithness was the son of John Sinclair, Master of Berriedale and his wife Jean, daughter of Colin Mackenzie, 1st Earl of Seaforth. His paternal grandparents were William Sinclair, Lord Berriedale and Mary, daughter of Henry Sinclair, Lord Sinclair. William Sinclair, Lord Berriedale was in turn a son of George Sinclair, 5th Earl of Caithness.

George Sinclair, 6th Earl of Caithness succeeded his great-grandfather and was served heir to John, Master of Berridale, his father in the earldom of Caithness on 21 March 1644.

== Earl of Caithness ==
=== Civil War ===
After the Stuart Restoration the Earl of Caithness had become a royalist and was active in suppressing the Covenanters. He was a member of the Privy Council of Scotland and Lord Lieutenant of the county of Caithness. A Sinclair clansmen, John Sinclair of Dunbeath Castle, joined the royalist James Graham, 1st Marquess of Montrose and was with him at the Battle of Carbisdale in 1650.

George Sinclair, 6th Earl of Caithness was present with Archibald Campbell, 1st Marquess of Argyll when Oliver Cromwell was proclaimed "Chiefe Magistrate of thir thrie nations, ouer the Crose of Elb".

=== Death and dispute to the Earldom of Caithness ===
George Sinclair, 6th Earl of Caithness married Mary, daughter of Archibald Campbell, 1st Marquess of Argyll, but had no children. He died at Thurso Castle in 1676. At the time of his death he was also an elder in the church of Thurso. It was recorded on 3 May 1676 that "Mr Andrew Munro, minister of Thurso, did represent that the Earl of Caithness, being visited with heavie sickness, did earnestlie desire that all the Brethen of the Presbie should remember him in the publick and private prayers to God, which desire was cordially entertained".

The Earldom of Caithness being much in debt, he had transferred the estates and the title to his principal creditor, John Campbell of Glenorchy, who upon Sinclair's death was created Earl of Caithness by patent. This however was challenged by George Sinclair of Keiss, son of Francis Sinclair of Northfield, who in turn was a younger son of George Sinclair, 5th Earl of Caithness. On 13 July 1680, Campbell of Glenorchy took a force of 800 men north to evict Sinclair of Keiss, who was waiting for him with 500 men near Wick. Inflamed with drink, the Sinclairs attacked the force of Campbells and were routed in what is known as the Battle of Altimarlach. Legend has it that so many Sinclairs were killed that the Campbells were able to cross the river without getting their feet wet. However, in 1681 the Privy Council of Scotland made a proclamation in favor of Sinclair of Keiss who became the 7th Earl of Caithness and Campbell of Glenorchy was created Earl of Breadalbane and Holland.

== See also ==
- Barony of Roslin
- Lord Sinclair
- Lord Herdmanston

Peerage of Scotland
Preceded by George Sinclair	Earl of Caithness; 1643–1672	Resigned; Title succeeded by John Campbell
