= Sheriff of Lauderdale =

The Sheriff of Lauderdale was historically the royal official responsible for enforcing law and order in Lauderdale, Scotland.

== Sheriffs of Lauderdale ==
- Aelsi de Clephane (1170)
- Henry St Clair of Herdmanston (1189)
- Alan de Clephane (1202)
