= Alexander Drummond of Carnock =

Scottish landowner involved in a plan to besiege Stirling Castle

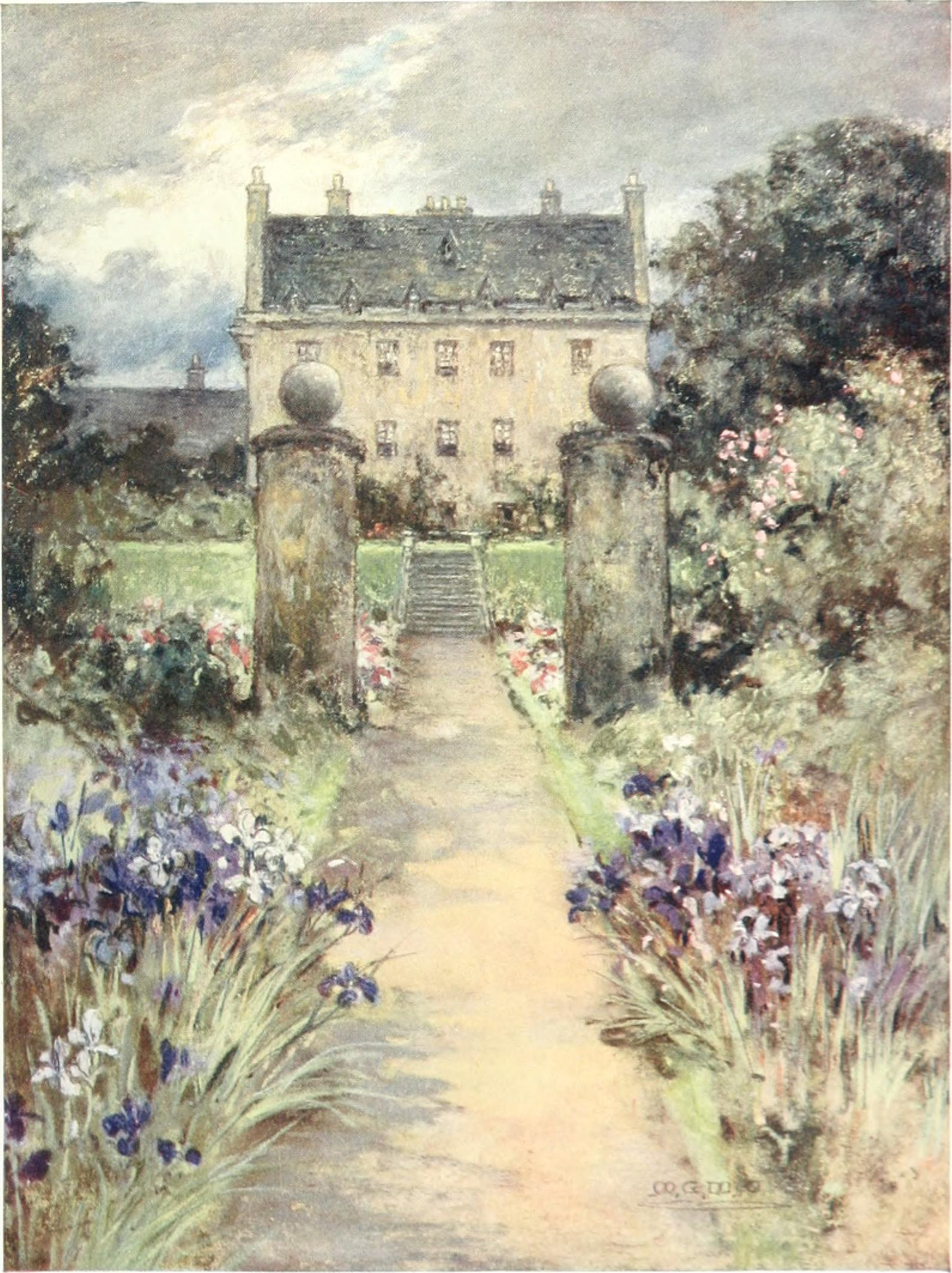
Watercolour of Carnock House from Herbert Maxwell, Scottish Gardens (1908)

Alexander Drummond of Carnock (died c. 1545), was a Scottish landowner and ally of the Douglas family involved in a plan to besiege Stirling Castle.

== Career ==
Alexander Drummond was the son of Robert Drummond 3rd laird of Carnock and Marion Monteith daughter of laird of West Carse.

One of his ancestors was Elizabeth Airth, joint heiress of the lands of Airth, Carnock, Plean, and he inherited the lands of Carnock and Arnmore.

Alexander Drummond was a friend of Archibald Douglas, 6th Earl of Angus, though the nature of his relationship is uncertain. He tried to help Angus recapture James V of Scotland by besieging the king and his mother Margaret Tudor at Stirling Castle. He was declared a traitor by the Parliament of Scotland in September 1528 for assisting and facilitating at the siege and went into England as an exile. The charge was that he had aided the earl and his brother George Douglas of Pittendreich;

"to invade our sovereign lord's person and the barons that were with him for his defence in the burgh of Stirling in the month of July last bypast; and for art and part of the treasonable revealing of the things which were done within the burgh of Stirling, treasonably advertising and explaining to the said earl and George what number of men our sovereign lord had and of their strength and power, and to give them "artatioune" to invade his highness that they might decide whether it were more gainful to fight with him or desist therefrom"

Alexander Drummond was again linked with the Douglas family in November 1543. It was thought he held the Castle of Dalkeith with the Master of Morton and James Douglas of Parkhead against Regent Arran.

== Family ==
Alexander Drummond married Marjory Bruce daughter of the laird of Auchenbowie.

The children of Alexander Drummond and Marjory Bruce included;

- Robert Drummond of Carnock
- Alexander Drummond of Midhope
- Charles Drummond of Kingsfield, Provost of Linlithgow
- Margaret Drummond married Walter MacAulay, laird of Ardincaple, and secondly Bartholomew Balfour, laird of Mackerston (McOreston in Menteith), and was the mother of Bartholomew Balfour, General of Scots troops in the Netherlands in 1592.
- A daughter, Lady Skemore and Throsk, and mother of Patrick Abercromby and David Abercromby. David Abercromby was a gentlemen of the equerry to Anne of Denmark. He died in June 1609 and declared his last will to the Countess of Roxburghe that his goods should go to his brother George. Patrick Abercromby was one of the grooms of King's Privy Chamber and seems to be the courtier who danced with James Auchmoutie of Auldhame & Scoughall in Ben Jonson's The Irish Masque at Court for the wedding of Robert Carr, 1st Earl of Somerset and Frances Howard in December 1613. In May 1617 Patrick Abercromby, Auchmoutie, Archibald Armstrong, Edward Zouch, and others left the king at Brechin Castle and rode to Aberdeen where they were made burgesses of the town.
