= John Sinclair, 8th Earl of Caithness =

Scottish nobleman

John Sinclair
- Earl of Caithness
- Earl of Caithness Coat of Arms
- Predecessor: George Sinclair, 7th Earl of Caithness
- Successor: Alexander Sinclair, 9th Earl of Caithness
- Died: 1705
- Noble family: Clan Sinclair
- Father: James Sinclair, 2nd of Murkle

John Sinclair (died 1705) was a Scottish nobleman, 8th Earl of Caithness and chief of the Clan Sinclair, a Scottish clan of the Scottish Highlands.

== Early life ==
John Sinclair, 8th Earl of Caithness was the son of James Sinclair 2nd of Murkle, who in turn was a grandson of John Sinclair, Master of Caithness (d. 1576), who in turn was a son of George Sinclair, 4th Earl of Caithness (d. 1582). He had succeeded to the Earldom of Caithness upon the death of his relation George Sinclair, 7th Earl of Caithness, in 1698, who had died without issue and this brought an end to the male heirs of George Sinclair, 5th Earl of Caithness. His father had resigned the lands of Murkle in favor of himself and of John in March 1644.

== Family ==
John Sinclair, 8th Earl of Caithness married Jean Carmichael, said to have been of the Hyndford family. He died in 1705, leaving the following children:

1. Alexander Sinclair, 9th Earl of Caithness, heir and successor.
2. John Sinclair, Lord Murkle, who was a Senator of the College of Justice, and who left no issue.
3. Francis Sinclair of Milton of Lieurary, who left no issue.
4. Archibald Sinclair.
5. Lady Janet Sinclair, who married David Sinclair of Southdun in 1714 and had several children.

== See also ==
- Barony of Roslin
- Lord Sinclair
- Lord Herdmanston

Peerage of Scotland
| Preceded by George Sinclair | Earl of Caithness; 1698–1705 | Succeeded by Alexander Sinclair |
