= Herdmanston House =

Former Scottish castle and 16th century manor house

Coordinates: 55.918361°N 2.845694°W

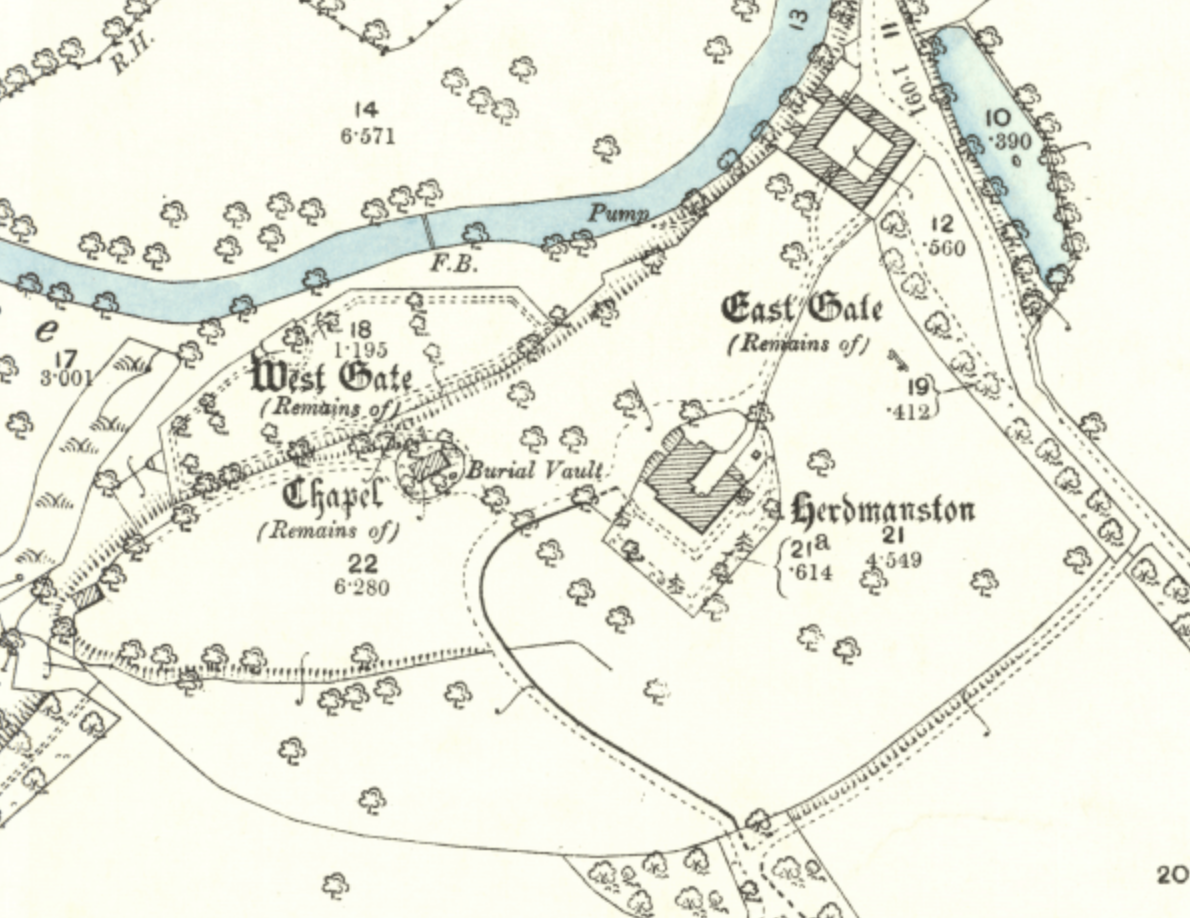
Herdmanston House and environs depicted on an 1894 Ordnnce Survey map

Herdmanston House was a castle and later tower house located in the parish of Saltoun, East Lothian in Scotland.

The lands of Herdmanston were held by the St Clair/Sinclair family from the 12th century, when Henry St Clair received a grant of lands of Herdmanston, from Richard de Morville, Constable of Scotland. Described as an L-plan 16th-century tower house, incorporating an earlier building. The tower was seized by Lord Gray of Wilton in 1548.

The house was demolished on 31 May 1969, after the house had been declared unsafe and uninhabitable after use by the military during the Second World War. A gate pillar remains at the site.

Nearby are located the remains of the 13th century chapel, dedicated to St John the Evangelist and the vault of the Sinclair family.
