= Adam Hepburn of Craggis =

Adam Hepburn
- Born: Battle of Flodden
- Died: 9 September 1513
- Occupation: Master of the Royal Stables
- Known for: Son of Adam Hepburn, Master of Hailes

Sir Adam Hepburn was the son of Adam Hepburn, Master of Hailes and Helen Home, and brother of Patrick, the first Earl of Bothwell. He lived at Craigs, Kirkcudbrightshire, Scotland.

He married Elizabeth Ogstoun, daughter of William Ogstoun, thus making a considerable addition to his patrimony. Attached to the royal household of James IV, he became Master of the Royal Stables on 30 March 1497. He was killed in action at the Battle of Flodden on 9 September 1513, as were his brother George and nephew Adam, the second Earl of Bothwell.

Adam Hepburn and his wife Elizabeth had three daughters:

- Helen Hepburn, married to Sir Patrick Hepburne of Waughton, died before 20 April 1560
- Elizabeth Hepburn, married Alexander Livingstone, 1st of Dunipace
- Janet Hepburn, married to James Auchinleck of Kenny

Since he died without male-issue, his estate was divided amongst these three daughters,
