= Kirkwall Castle =

Coordinates: 58.9823°N 2.9605°W

A plaque marking the castle site

Kirkwall Castle, also known as King's Castle, was located in Kirkwall, the main settlement in the Orkney Islands of Scotland. Built in the 14th century, it was deliberately destroyed in 1614. The last ruins were cleared in the 19th century. The castle was located around the corner of Broad Street and Castle Street in the centre of Kirkwall.

== History ==
In the 14th century, Henry Sinclair, Earl of Orkney, (c. 1345 – c. 1400) held the Earldom of Orkney from King Haakon VI of Norway. Sinclair built the castle at Kirkwall soon after being granted the Earldom in 1379. Henry Sinclair, 4th Lord Sinclair, and Patrick Hepburn, 1st Earl of Bothwell were both made keeper of castle and granted administrative offices in Orkney in May 1489. William Sinclair, 5th Lord Sinclair complained that James Sinclair's men took the castle at Easter 1528, and it was said that at the time of the Battle of Summerdale, relatives of James Sinclair were captured at Kirkwall Castle and executed. The castle and town were defended by Edward Sinclair of Strom against an English landing party led by John Clere in August 1557, and many of his men drowned during their retreat.

In the early 17th century Patrick Stewart, 2nd Earl of Orkney, feuded with Laurence Bruce, Sheriff of Shetland. Stewart was arrested in 1610, and in May 1614 his son, Robert, rebelled against King James VI. Robert and his supporters occupied Kirkwall Castle, along with the Bishop's and Earl's Palaces, and St Magnus Cathedral. In August, George Sinclair, 5th Earl of Caithness led royal troops against the rebels, and Kirkwall Castle surrendered in September. On 26 October 1614 the Privy Council of Scotland ordered that Kirkwall Castle be demolished, although this was not carried out until the following year.

The ruins stood until 1742, when James Douglas, 14th Earl of Morton, granted the stones to the Town Council to build a new town house and jail. By 1865 only a 55-foot (16.8 m) section of wall, 11 feet (3.4 m) thick remained, and this was removed to improve access to the harbour. A plaque dated 1865 on Castle Street marks the site of the castle. In 2019, the tarmac on Castle Street was taken up for roadworks, and the foundations of Kirkwall Castle were uncovered underneath the road.
