= George Hepburn (bishop) =

British politician

- Bishop of the Isles
- Church: Roman Catholic Church
- Diocese: The Isles
- Appointed: 10 February 1511
- Term ended: 9 February 1513
- Other post(s): Abbot of Iona (1510–1513) Abbot of Arbroath (1504–1513)

Orders
- Consecration: 1510

Personal details
- Born: c. 1454
- Died: 9 September 1513 (aged c. 59); Branxton, Northumberland, England
- Parents: Adam Hepburn

George Hepburn (died 9 September 1513) was the son of Adam Hepburn and brother to Patrick Hepburn, the first Earl of Bothwell.

He was a churchman, and served firstly as postulate Abbot of Arbroath, before becoming Lord High Treasurer of Scotland for a brief spell in 1509. Serving in that role only for a short time, he was consecrated as Bishop of the Isles in 1510 and was also Commendator of the Abbeys of Arbroath and Icolmkill.

He was killed at the Battle of Flodden in 1513, as was his brother Adam and his nephew, also Adam, the second Earl of Bothwell.
