= Henry Sinclair, 4th Lord Sinclair =

Scottish noble

Henry Sinclair
- Lord Sinclair
- Lord Sinclair coat of arms
- Predecessor: William Sinclair, 3rd Lord Sinclair
- Successor: William Sinclair, 5th Lord Sinclair
- Died: 9 September 1513; Branxton, Northumberland, England
- Noble family: Clan Sinclair
- Father: William Sinclair, 3rd Lord Sinclair
- Mother: Christian Leslie

Henry Sinclair (died 1513) was a Scottish noble and the 4th Lord Sinclair. In The Scots Peerage by James Balfour Paul he is designated as the 3rd Lord Sinclair, but historian Roland Saint-Clair designates him the 4th Lord Sinclair and references this to an Act of the Scottish Parliament in which he was made Lord Sinclair based on his descent from his great-grandfather, Henry II Sinclair, Earl of Orkney, the first Lord Sinclair. Bernard Burke, in his a Genealogical and Heraldic Dictionary of the Peerage and Baronetage of the British Empire, agrees with Roland Saint-Clair and says that Henry Sinclair was "in reality" the fourth holder of the title of Lord Sinclair.

== Early life ==
He was the son of William Sinclair, 3rd Lord Sinclair and Christian Leslie, daughter of George Leslie, 1st Earl of Rothes. Immediately after the death of his father, an Act was passed by the Scottish Parliament in his favour and which recognised him as "Chief of yat blude" and willing "yarfor that he be callit Lord Saintclair in tyme to cum", dated 26 January 1488–89. This Act was only a recognition of the Barony of St. Clair existing in the person of his ancestor, Henry II Sinclair, Earl of Orkney and did not constitute a new creation.

== Notable offices ==
Henry Sinclair, 4th Lord Sinclair sat as a Baron of Parliament on 14 January 1488. On 4 December 1488, Confirmation issued to him and his wife Margaret, the lands of Cousland, house and fortalice, and Ravenscraig with the adjacent lands of Woolston, Carberry and Dubbo.

Lord Sinclair is mentioned with frequent involvement in the Orcadian dominions. As the Tacksman of the Isles he granted an annuity to the Bishop of Orkney on 6 August 1485. On 28 May 1489 Lord Sinclair received several grants including a 13-year lease of Orkney and Shetland, the custody of Kirkwall Castle with the fortalices, and the Justicary, Foudery and Balliatus for 13 years. It is also likely that through his influence an Act of the Scottish Parliament was passed in 1503 for the annulment of all foreign laws within that realm and to spare the native laws of Orkney and Shetland. In 1503, he had sasine of the lands of Newburgh.

The poet and translator Gavin Douglas mentions that Lord Sinclair was an inspiration for his version of the Aeneid. Sinclair may known Gavin Douglas at the royal court. Sinclair was made Master of the Artillery on 13 March 1510, for a fee of £100 a year, deducted from his Orkney accounts. His main residence was at Ravenscraig Castle. He was on bad terms with the inhabitants of Dysart as shown by a complaint made against him by John Wynde, burgess of Dysart. In 1512, he was the captain of the Scottish flagship, the Great Michael.

Shortly before his death his sold eight pieces of ordance to the King for £100 which was paid to his widow. Henry Sinclair was killed at the Battle of Flodden on 9 September 1513.

== Family ==
Henry Sinclair, 4th Lord Sinclair, married Margaret, daughter of Adam Hepburn, Master of Hailes and sister of Patrick Hepburn, 1st Earl of Bothwell. They had the following children:

1. William Sinclair, 5th Lord Sinclair, heir and successor.
2. Catherine Sinclair, who in 1512 married Sir David Wemyss of Wemyss, ancestor of the Earls of Wemyss.
3. Helen Sinclair, who married James Ogilvy, 4th Lord Ogilvy of Airlie.
4. Jean Sinclair, who married Sir Alexander Lindsay, Master of Crawford and son of David Lindsay, 8th Earl of Crawford.
5. Agnes Sinclair, who married Patrick Hepburn, 3rd Earl of Bothwell.
6. William Sinclair, a natural son who was legitimised on 20 February 1539–40. He was Chaplain, Rector of Olrig and later Vicar of Latheron.

== See also ==
- Barony of Roslin
- Earl of Caithness
- Lord Herdmanston

Peerage of Scotland
Preceded by William Sinclair	Lord Sinclair; 1487–1513	Succeeded by William Sinclair
