= Adam Hepburn, Master of Hailes =

Adam Hepburn, Master of Hailes (after 1432 – 1479) was Sheriff of Berwickshire in April 1467, and had a charter of confirmation of Dunsyre in the sheriffdom of Lanarkshire, dated 13 October 1475, being thereafter designated 'of Dunsyre'.

== Family ==
Adam Hepburn, Master of Hailes, was the son of Sir Patrick Hepburn, 1st Lord Hailes and Ellen Wallace. He was not of age to marry on 2 February 1448, the date of the marriage contract agreed between his father and father-in-law Alexander Home, 1st Lord Home, which settled the contract of marriage between Adam and Helen Home, Sir Alexander's daughter by his spouse Marion Lauder.

== Children ==
1. Patrick Hepburn, 1st Earl of Bothwell (c. 1452 – 18 October 1508).
2. George Hepburn (c. 1454 – 9 September 1513)
3. Margaret Hepburn (c. 1456 – 8 November 1542) married Sir David Wemyss of Wemyss and (bef 4 Dec 1488) Henry Sinclair, 4th Lord Sinclair.
4. Adam Hepburn (c. 1457 – 9 September 1513)
5. Elizabeth (Agnes) Hepburn (born c. 1461) married Alexander Home

== Intrigue ==
Hepburn is believed to have intrigued with the widowed Queen Mary of Gueldres, a young and beautiful woman. He attached himself to the party of the Boyds, and was concerned in the seizure of King James III at Linlithgow on 9 July 1466, for which he obtained a remission from Parliament dated 13 October that year.

Adam Hepburn of Dunsyre is one of the several illustrious jurors on an Assize, 5 March 1470/1, which acquitted Andrew Ker of Cessford of aiding and abetting James Douglas, 3rd Earl of Angus "traitor from England within Scotland", for his association with Robert Boyd, 1st Lord Boyd after he was declared a rebel, and other accusations, all of which Ker had denied. Others on the jury were Archibald Douglas, 5th Earl of Angus, David Lindsay, 3rd Earl of Crawford, Alexander Cunningham, Lord Kilmaurs, James Hamilton, 1st Lord Hamilton, and Sir Alexander Lauder of Haltoun. (Hist. MSS).
