= Ravenscraig Castle =

Castle in Kirkcaldy, Scotland

Coordinates: 56°7′10.48″N 3°8′28.58″W

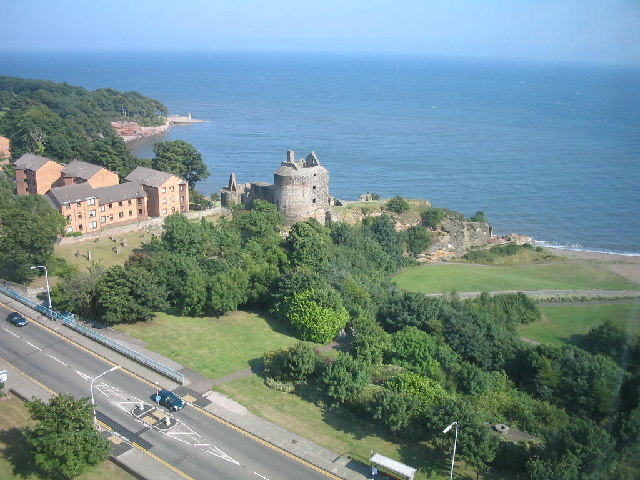
Aerial view of Ravenscraig Castle

Ravenscraig Castle is a ruined castle located in Kirkcaldy which dates from around 1460. The castle is an early example of artillery defence in Scotland.

== History ==
The construction of Ravenscraig Castle by the mason Henry Merlion and the master carpenter Friar Andres Lesouris was ordered by King James II (reigned 1437–1460) as a home for his wife, Mary of Guelders. The castle is considered one of the first—perhaps the very first—in Scotland to be built to withstand cannon fire and provide for artillery defence. The king was an artillery enthusiast and was involved with the planning but, ironically, was killed when one of his cannon exploded at the Siege of Roxburgh Castle in the Scottish Borders.

Construction was commenced around 1460 by his widow, Mary of Guelders, as a memorial to him and as a dower house. She continued the construction work until her death in December 1463, when the east tower and the basement of the central section was probably built for her by the master mason Henry Merlioun. The site was supervised by the master of works, David Boys. Andrew Balfour, a servant of the royal wardrobe, organised the supply of timber joists in 1461, the timber was boated down the Allan Water and shipped to Fife from Stirling. During this period her steward Henry Kinghorn and other members of the household were able to live in completed accommodation.

Ownership passed to her son James III (reigned 1460–1488). In 1471 he gave the castle to William Sinclair, Earl of Orkney and Caithness in exchange for the Earldom of Orkney and associated lands which James annexed from Norway to the Scottish Crown. The castle was completed by the Sinclairs, who also had an interest in artillery fortifications.

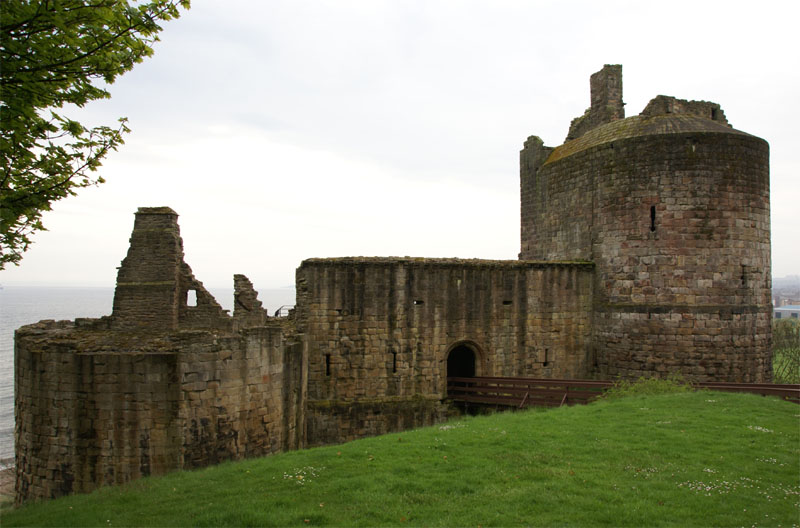
Ravenscraig Castle, showing the large D-plan west tower, and the ruined east tower

James V and Mary of Guise came to Ravenscraig on 9 April 1540 on their way to Falkland Palace. They arrived in two galleys rowed from Kinghorn. The Duke of Holstein came to the castle with William Schaw in 1598.

During the 1650–51 invasion of Scotland by English forces under Oliver Cromwell, Ravenscraig was invaded, attacked and damaged. The castle remained in the ownership of the Sinclairs, who built nearby Dysart House (1755–1756) on the estate, and later passed to the St Clair-Erskines, Earls of Rosslyn. The estate and castle remained in the family until sold in 1896, by the 5th Earl, to linoleum magnate Sir Michael Nairn who lived in Dysart House.

The castle was used as an ammunition depot during the First World War. In 1929, 85 acres (34 ha) of the estate, including the castle, was given to the town of Kirkcaldy by the Nairn family as a public park. Ravenscraig Castle was passed into state care in 1955 and has been open to the public by the owners Historic Scotland since 1971. It is now managed by Historic Environment Scotland, and is protected as a Scheduled Ancient Monument.

Celtic punk band The Real McKenzies filmed the video for their song Drink Some More at Ravenscraig Castle.

== The castle ==
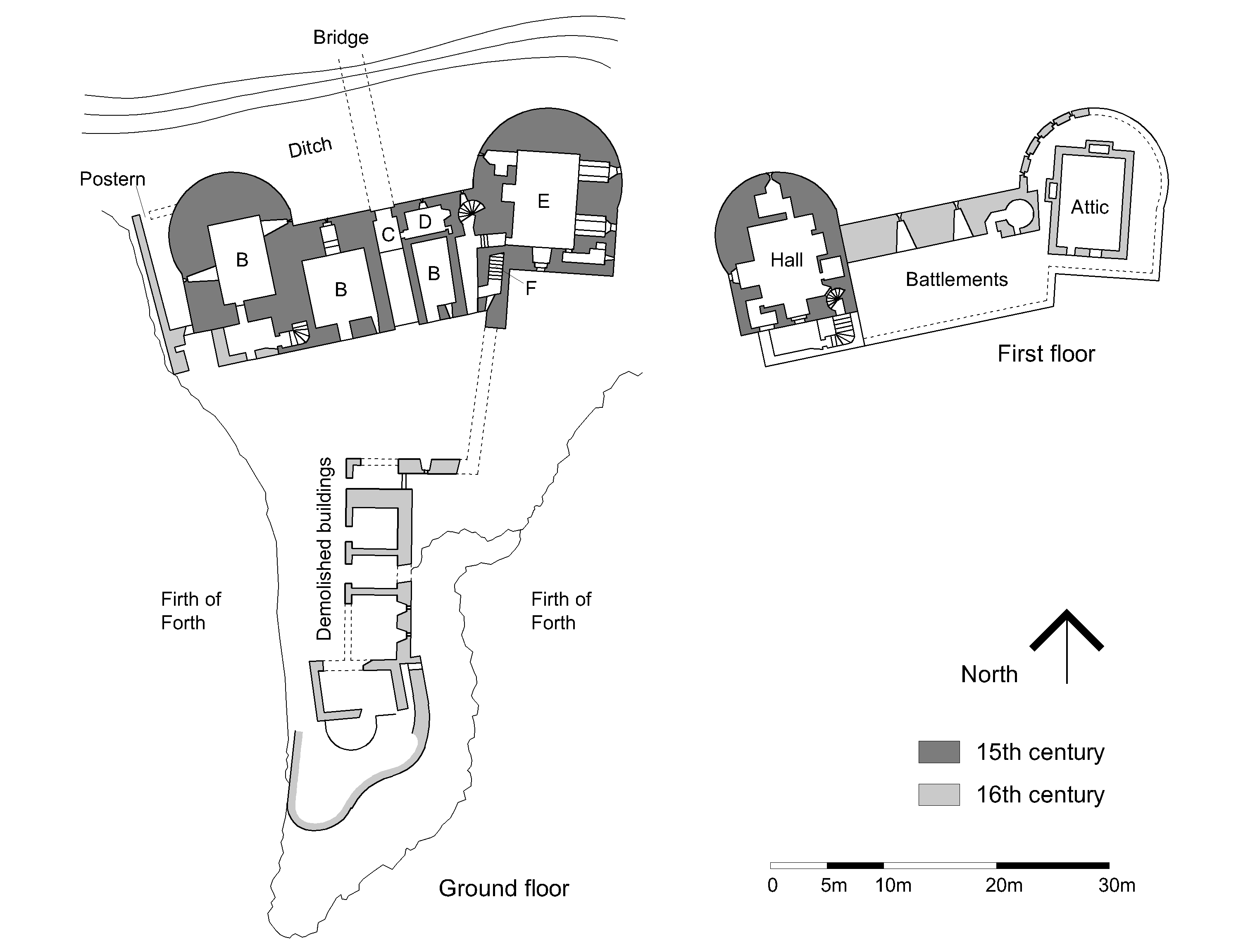
Plan of Ravenscraig Castle Key: A=Postern B=Cellar C=Entrance passage D=Guard room E=Chamber F=Stair down

Ravenscraig is a small castle, built on a narrow rocky promontory in the Firth of Forth. It is naturally defended on three sides by steep cliffs dropping to the sea, and the main part of the castle forms the northern, landward, defence. This comprises two D-plan towers, with outer walls 4.25 metres (13.9 ft) thick, designed to withstand cannon fire. Battlements between the towers formed an artillery platform, with gun holes pointing to landward. The whole is defended by a deep, rock-cut ditch, and is accessed via a bridge.

=== The towers ===
The west tower stands to four storeys, and has a single small room on each floor. At the ground floor is a vaulted cellar, with a hall above, accessed via a stone forestair, or outside stairway. A spiral stair links the upper levels, although the timber floors are no longer present. Chimneys rise through the walls to form features of the castle's skyline. The east tower is of three storeys, although its base is set lower into the cliff. A well is located at the lowest level, with a single chamber on each level above, although again the timber floors are missing. The floors are linked by a straight stair within the thickness of the west wall. The rooms of both towers are windowless to landward, due to the thick walls, but have windows with stone seats to the other sides.

=== Linking building and courtyard ===
The towers are linked by a central block, which contains the main gate and entrance passage. Vaulted cellars and a guard room lie to either side. These vaults support the artillery platform above. The gun holes are of the "inverted keyhole" type, which became common in the late 15th century. Beyond the main block, only the foundations remain of the buildings on the promontory.

== Literary inspiration ==
Rosabelle by Sir Walter Scott

Ravenscraig is the setting for the ballad Rosabelle, sung by Lord St. Clair's bard, Harold, at the wedding feast in the sixth canto of Sir Walter Scott's Lay of the Last Minstrel. The ballad tells in elliptical style of 'the lovely Rosabelle', apparently a daughter of the St. Clair (or Sinclair) family, who insists despite dire warnings on setting out by boat from Ravenscraig (called 'Ravensheuch' by Scott) across the Firth of Forth, to attend a ball at the family seat, Roslin Castle, in Midlothian. Rosabelle knows that, as well as her parents, a certain 'Lord Lindesay's heir' will be present. However, that night an eerie light blazes on Roslin Castle and the nearby chapel where Rosabelle's ancestors lie buried, while Rosabelle herself lies drowned.

Henry I Sinclair, Earl of Orkney, who built the first Rosslyn castle in the 11th century, was married to a Rosabel.
