= Henry Sinclair, 6th Lord Sinclair =

Scottish nobleman

Henry Sinclair
- Lord Sinclair
- Lord Sinclair coat of arms
- Predecessor: William Sinclair, 5th Lord Sinclair
- Successor: Henry Sinclair, 7th Lord Sinclair
- Died: 1601
- Noble family: Clan Sinclair
- Father: William Sinclair, 5th Lord Sinclair
- Mother: Lady Elizabeth Keith

Henry Sinclair (died 1601) was a Scottish nobleman and the 6th Lord Sinclair. In The Scots Peerage by James Balfour Paul he is designated as the 5th Lord Sinclair in descent starting from William Sinclair, 1st Earl of Caithness and 3rd Earl of Orkney, but historian Roland Saint-Clair designates him as the 6th Lord Sinclair in descent from the father of the 1st Earl of Caithness and 3rd Earl of Orkney, Henry II Sinclair, Earl of Orkney, who is the first person recorded as Lord Sinclair in public records. Roland Saint-Clair references this to an Act of the Scottish Parliament in which the 4th Lord Sinclair was made Lord Sinclair based on his descent from his great-grandfather, Henry II Sinclair, Earl of Orkney, the first Lord Sinclair. Bernard Burke, in his a Genealogical and Heraldic Dictionary of the Peerage and Baronetage of the British Empire, agrees with Roland Saint-Clair and says that Henry Sinclair's father, William Sinclair, was "in reality" the fifth Lord Sinclair.

== Early life ==
He was the son of William Sinclair, 5th Lord Sinclair and Lady Elizabeth Keith, widow of Colin, Master of Oliphant and daughter of William, 3rd Earl Marischal.

== Lord Sinclair ==
Henry Sinclair, 6th Lord Sinclair, first appears on national records on 1 August 1560 as a Baron of Parliament, then as the Master of Sinclair. On 12 September 1565 the Master of Sinclair, along with other gentry from Fife, signed at St Andrews a bond to the King and Queen to "take part and pursue all rebels into England". On 19 October 1565 he was appointed one of the Keepers of Havens. Henry, Master of Sinclair, was recorded as being one of the Lords of Convention at Perth on 27 July 1569, and on 29 October 1569 he recorded his vote against the Queen's divorce. He supported the Reformation and was a member of the Privy Council of Scotland before 1573.

Henry Sinclair, 6th Lord Sinclair, succeeded his father in 1570. He made a complaint, on 22 October 1579, that his house of Knockhall in Aberdeenshire had been sacked, for which he suspected William Forbes of Spayside, who was a broken man, and an order was issued requiring the occupants to surrender the house.

In the Bodleian Library there is a manuscript collection of poems by various authors which is described as "liver Henrieii dmi Sinclair". The manuscript contains 231 folios and has various writings and signatures including: "Mawnis Synclar", "Be me Laurence Sincla", "Elezabeth Synclar within", "Villam Lord", "be me Patrick Schiner", "Jeff (or Jess) Sinclar" and "Maluin (Malcolm) Sin...". Folio 118 has a blazon of the arms of Orkney and according to Roland Saint-Clair is the earliest specimen of extant Scottish heraldic art on vellum or paper.

Henry Sinclair, 6th Lord Sinclair was one of the nobles that rallied around James VI of Scotland when he escaped from the Ruthvens. Upon the death of Mary, Queen of Scots on 8 February 1587, King James arranged for his courtiers to appear before him in the morning and Henry, Lord Sinclair arrived in a full suit of armour. The king was angry at him and asked if he had not heard of the general order, to which Sinclair replied "Yes!, this is the proper mourning for the Queen of Scotland".

A pedigree chart of the family which was allegedly drawn up by him in 1590 is preserved in the Lyon Office.

The Earl of Huntly took refuge in Sinclair's Ravenscraig Castle in 1591–92 after he had killed the ex-Regent Moray. Sinclair told him that he was welcome to come in but was twice as welcome to have passed by. On 2 December 1596 Henry, Lord Sinclair, was ordered to free William Bonar of Rossie, whom he had imprisoned in Ravenscraig Castle.

== Family ==
Henry Sinclair, 6th Lord Sinclair married firstly to Janet, daughter of Patrick, Lord Lindsay with whom he had the following children:

1. James Sinclair, Master of Sinclair, who died in 1592. He married Isabella, daughter of Andrew Leslie, 5th Earl of Rothes and had the children: Henry Sinclair, James Sinclair and Patrick Sinclair who were respectively each successively the 7th, 8th and 9th Lords Sinclair. He also had the daughters Catherine Sinclair and Margaret Sinclair, the latter who married William Sinclair, Lord Berriedale, eldest son of George Sinclair, 5th Earl of Caithness.
2. Patrick Sinclair, who married Catherine, daughter of James Boswell of Balmuto and who was ancestor of the Sinclairs of Belgreggie.
3. Andrew Sinclair, who was a member of the Danish Rigsraad. He married Kristina Kaas who was a noble Danish lady with whom he had at least three sons and one daughter.
4. Magnus Sinclair.
5. Helen Sinclair, wife of Andrew Kinninmount of Kinninmount.

Henry Sinclair, 6th Lord Sinclair married secondly, Elizabeth, daughter of William, 7th Lord Forbes and had the following children:

1. Henry Sinclair, from whom begins the "Genealogical Descendance" of the Swedish Sinclairs.
2. Laurence Sinclair.
3. William Sinclair.
4. Elizabeth Sinclair, who married Duncan Campbell of Glenorchy, ancestor of the Earls of Breadalbane and Holland
5. Jane Sinclair.

== Death ==
Henry Sinclair, 6th Lord Sinclair, died on 21 October 1601, and was succeeded by his grandson Henry Sinclair, 7th Lord Sinclair who died in 1602 and was succeeded by his brother James Sinclair, 8th Lord Sinclair. James Sinclair died in 1607 and was succeeded by his brother Patrick Sinclair, 9th Lord Sinclair who died in 1617 and was succeeded by his son John Sinclair, 10th Lord Sinclair.

== See also ==
- Barony of Roslin
- Earl of Caithness
- Lord Herdmanston

Peerage of Scotland
Preceded by William Sinclair	Lord Sinclair; 1570–1601	Succeeded by Henry Sinclair
