= James St Clair, 14th Lord Sinclair =

Major The Right Honourable The Lord Sinclair

Scottish Representative Peer
- In office 3 December 1868 – 24 October 1880

Personal details
- Born: James St Clair; 3 July 1803
- Died: 24 October 1880 (aged 77)
- Spouse: Jane Little (m. 1830)
- Children: 6
- Parent(s): Charles St Clair, 13th Lord Sinclair; Mary Agnes Chisholm

Maj. James St Clair, 14th Lord Sinclair (3 July 1803 – 24 October 1880) was a Scottish noble and representative peer.

== Early life ==
St Clair was born on 3 July 1803. He was the eldest son of Charles St Clair, 13th Lord Sinclair, and his first wife, Mary Agnes Chisholm (d. 1814), the only daughter of James Chisholm of Chisholm. His paternal grandparents were Elizabeth (née Rutherfurd) St Clair (a daughter of John Rutherfurd, MP for Roxburghshire) and Andrew St Clair of Herdmanston, de jure 12th Lord Sinclair.

Charles St Clair, de jure 11th Lord Sinclair (a son of Dr. Matthew St Clair, who was a younger brother of John Sinclair, 23rd Lord Herdmanston). His maternal grandmother was Eleanor (née Elliot) Rutherfurd (a daughter of the Lord Justice Clerk Sir Gilbert Elliot, 2nd Baronet, of Minto). His uncle, John Rutherfurd, was also an MP for Roxburghshire, and married Mary Ann Leslie (a daughter of Maj.-Gen. Alexander Leslie and granddaughter of Alexander Leslie, 5th Earl of Leven).

== Career ==
Upon his father's death in 1863, he inherited the Lordship of Sinclair (which had been confirmed on his father by the House of Lords in 1782) He was an Ensign with the Grenadier Guards in 1822. He was made Lieutenant and Captain in 1826, and Major of the 92nd Foot in 1827.

Lord Sinclair sat in the House of Lords as a Conservative Scottish representative peer from 1868 until his death in 1880.

== Personal life ==
On 14 September 1830, St Clair was married to Jane Little, eldest daughter of Archibald Little, of Shabden Park. Together, they were the parents of:

- Charles William St Clair, 15th Lord Sinclair (1831–1922), who married Margaret Jane Murray, a daughter of James Murray, of Ancoats Hall, in 1870.
- Archibald St Clair (1833–1872), a Commander of the Royal Navy.
- James Chisholm St Clair (1837–1902), who served in the Madras Civil Service (later the Indian Civil Service) from 1857 to 1882.
- Lockhart Matthew St Clair (1855–1930), who was Secretary to the Government, Central Provinces, India; he married Ellen Mary Margaret Rice, a daughter of Maj.-Gen William Roche Rice in 1881.
- Mary Agnes St Clair (b. 1840)
- Helen St Clair (1842–1849), who died young.

Lord Sinclair died on 24 October 1880 and was succeeded in the lordship by his eldest son Charles. His widow died on 17 June 1887.

Peerage of Scotland
Preceded by Charles St Clair	Lord Sinclair; 1863–1880	Succeeded by Charles St Clair
