= John St Clair, 7th Lord Herdmanston =

14th-century Scottish noble

John St Clair
- Predecessor: William St Clair
- Successor: William St Clair
- Noble family: Clan Sinclair

John St Clair, Lord Herdmanston, Baron of Carfrae and Cessford, was a Scottish noble of the 14th century.

John was the son of William St Clair of Herdmanston and Margaret, daughter of William St Clair, Master of Roslin. He resigned the barony of Cessford to younger brother Walter St.Clair in 1376. His half sister was Margaret, Countess of Angus and Mar from John's mother's second marriage. John married Elizabeth, the daughter and heiress of Patrick de Polwarth of Polwarth, bringing the estates of Polwarth and Kimmeringhame into the family. John was succeeded by his son William.
