= James Sinclair, 8th Lord Sinclair =

Scottish nobleman

James Sinclair
- Lord Sinclair
- Lord Sinclair coat of arms
- Predecessor: Henry Sinclair, 7th Lord Sinclair
- Successor: Patrick Sinclair, 9th Lord Sinclair
- Died: 1607
- Noble family: Clan Sinclair
- Father: James Sinclair, Master of Sinclair
- Mother: Isabella, daughter of Andrew Leslie, 5th Earl of Rothes

James Sinclair (died 1607) was a Scottish nobleman and the 8th Lord Sinclair. In The Scots Peerage by James Balfour Paul he is designated as the 7th Lord Sinclair in descent starting from William Sinclair, 1st Earl of Caithness and 3rd Earl of Orkney, but historian Roland Saint-Clair designates him as the 8th Lord Sinclair in descent from the father of the 1st Earl of Caithness and 3rd Earl of Orkney, Henry II Sinclair, Earl of Orkney, who is the first person recorded as Lord Sinclair in public records. Roland Saint-Clair references this to an Act of the Scottish Parliament in which the 4th Lord Sinclair was made Lord Sinclair based on his descent from his great-grandfather, Henry II Sinclair, Earl of Orkney, the first Lord Sinclair. Bernard Burke, in his a Genealogical and Heraldic Dictionary of the Peerage and Baronetage of the British Empire, agrees with the numbering by Roland Saint-Clair and says that Henry Sinclair (died 1513) and William Sinclair (died 1570) were "in reality" the fourth and fifth Lords Sinclair respectively.

== Lord Sinclair ==
He was the second son of James Sinclair, Master of Sinclair who died in 1592 and his wife Isabella, daughter of Andrew Leslie, 5th Earl of Rothes. He was also the grandson of Henry Sinclair, 6th Lord Sinclair. His elder brother was Henry Sinclair, 7th Lord Sinclair who died in 1602 and whom he succeeded. He died in 1607 and was succeeded by his brother Patrick Sinclair, 9th Lord Sinclair.

== See also ==
- Barony of Roslin
- Earl of Caithness
- Lord Herdmanston

Peerage of Scotland
Preceded by Henry Sinclair	Lord Sinclair; 1602–1607	Succeeded by Patrick Sinclair
