= John St Clair, 11th Lord Herdmanston =

14th-century Scottish noble

John St Clair
- Predecessor: William St Clair
- Successor: William St Clair
- Noble family: Clan Sinclair

John St Clair, Lord Herdmanston, Baron of Carfrae, Lord of Polwarth and Kimmerghame, was a Scottish noble of the 15th century.

John was the son of William St Clair, Lord Herdmanston. After the siege of Edinburgh Castle in 1446, he was paid expenses for his services. John was ultimately succeeded by his second son William. His eldest son John having predeceased him, whom had had two daughters, Mariota and Margaret. The estates were split into moieties, however after negotiations between the families, the Herdmanston estates went to William St Clair, George Hume of Wedderburn, Mariota's husband received Polwarth, and Patrick Hume, Margaret's husband received Kimmerghame.

== Family ==
1. John St Clair, Master of Herdmanston, m. Katharine, daughter of Thomas Hume of that Ilk.
2. Willian St Clair of Herdmanston
3. Alexander St Clair
4. James St Clair
