= Henry Sinclair, 7th Lord Sinclair =

Scottish nobleman

Henry Sinclair
- Lord Sinclair
- Lord Sinclair coat of arms
- Predecessor: Henry Sinclair, 6th Lord Sinclair
- Successor: James Sinclair, 8th Lord Sinclair
- Died: 1602
- Noble family: Clan Sinclair
- Father: James Sinclair, Master of Sinclair
- Mother: Isabella, daughter of Andrew Leslie, 5th Earl of Rothes

Henry Sinclair (died 1602) was a Scottish nobleman and 7th Lord Sinclair. In The Scots Peerage by James Balfour Paul he is designated as the 6th Lord Sinclair in descent starting from William Sinclair, 1st Earl of Caithness and 3rd Earl of Orkney, but historian Roland Saint-Clair designates him as the 7th Lord Sinclair in descent from the father of the 1st Earl of Caithness and 3rd Earl of Orkney, Henry II Sinclair, Earl of Orkney, who is the first person recorded as Lord Sinclair in public records. Roland Saint-Clair references this to an Act of the Scottish Parliament in which the 4th Lord Sinclair was made Lord Sinclair based on his descent from his great-grandfather, Henry II Sinclair, Earl of Orkney, the first Lord Sinclair. Bernard Burke, in his a Genealogical and Heraldic Dictionary of the Peerage and Baronetage of the British Empire, agrees with the numbering by Roland Saint-Clair and says that Henry Sinclair (died 1513) and William Sinclair (died 1570) were "in reality" the fourth and fifth Lords Sinclair respectively.

== Lord Sinclair ==
He was the son of James Sinclair, Master of Sinclair who died in 1592 and his wife Isabella, daughter of Andrew Leslie, 5th Earl of Rothes. He was also the grandson of Henry Sinclair, 6th Lord Sinclair whom he succeeded in 1601. There was a notice of precognition obtained against this Lord Sinclair and a Robert Sinclair dated 3 May 1604. However he had died in 1602 and was succeeded by his brother James Sinclair, 8th Lord Sinclair.

== See also ==
- Barony of Roslin
- Earl of Caithness
- Lord Herdmanston

Peerage of Scotland
Preceded by Henry Sinclair	Lord Sinclair; 1601–1602	Succeeded by James Sinclair
