= William St Clair, 5th Lord Herdmanston =

13th-14th-century Scottish noble

William St Clair
- Predecessor: John St Clair
- Successor: William St Clair
- Noble family: Clan Sinclair

William St Clair, Lord Herdmanston, Baron of Carfrae and Cessford, was a Scottish noble of the 13th-14th centuries.

William was the son of John St Clair of Herdmanston. With his father and Henry St Clair of Roslin and William St Clair, Master of Roslin they were companions of King Robert the Bruce, they fought at the Battle of Bannockburn in 1314. The Herdmanston family held for many years a broadsword, which was engraved on the broad side of the blade read Le Roi me donne, St.Cler me Porte (The King gave me, Sinclair carries me). William obtained in 1325, a charter from Robert I, the Barony of Cesswith (Cessford). Cessford had been forfeited to the crown after the treason of Roger de Mowbray in 1320. He was succeeded by his son William.
