= Charles St Clair, 13th Lord Sinclair =

Scottish noble and representative peer

Lieutenant colonel The Right Honourable The Lord Sinclair

Scottish Representative Peer
- In office 9 June 1807 – 23 April 1831

Personal details
- Born: Charles St Clair; 30 July 1768
- Died: 30 September 1863 (aged 95)
- Spouses: Mary Agnes Chisholm (m. 1802; died 1814) Isabella Mary Chatto (m. 1816)
- Relations: John Rutherfurd (grandfather)
- Parent(s): Elizabeth Rutherfurd; Andrew St Clair

Lt.-Col. Charles St Clair, 13th Lord Sinclair (30 July 1768 – 30 September 1863) was a Scottish noble and representative peer.

== Early life ==
Charles Sinclair was born on 30 July 1768. He was the eldest son of Elizabeth (née Rutherfurd) St Clair (c. 1740–1783) and Andrew St Clair of Herdmanston, de jure 12th Lord Sinclair.

His paternal grandfather was Charles St Clair, de jure 11th Lord Sinclair (a son of Dr. Matthew St Clair, who was a younger brother of John Sinclair, 23rd Lord Herdmanston). His maternal grandparents were John Rutherfurd, MP for Roxburghshire, and Eleanor (née Elliot) Rutherfurd (a daughter of the Lord Justice Clerk Sir Gilbert Elliot, 2nd Baronet, of Minto). His uncle, John Rutherfurd, was also an MP for Roxburghshire, and married Mary Ann Leslie (a daughter of Maj.-Gen. Alexander Leslie and granddaughter of Alexander Leslie, 5th Earl of Leven).

== Career ==
His claim to the Lordship of Sinclair was confirmed by the House of Lords on 25 April 1782. (Note: Upon the death of John Sinclair, 10th Lord Sinclair in 1676, the title passed to his grandson, Henry St Clair, 11th Lord Sinclair (the eldest son of his only child, Catherine, who had married her distant cousin, John Sinclair, 23rd Lord Herdmanston). He obtained a new charter of the peerage in 1677 confirming him in the title and with remainders respectively to his brother Henry Sinclair and his father's brothers Robert St Clair, George St Clair and Matthew St Clair, and failing them to his own heirs male whatsoever. After the 11th Lord's death in 1723, the title passed to his son, John St Clair, Master of Sinclair, however, he had been attainted by Parliament for his involvement in the Jacobite rising of 1715 and was not allowed to assume the title. After he died in 1750, the claim to the title passed to his younger brother Gen. James St Clair, who never assumed the title. On his death in 1762, the lordship became dormant, remaining so until it was successfully claimed by Charles in 1782. He was the son of Andrew St Clair, de jure 12th Lord Sinclair, grandson of Charles Sinclair, de jure 11th Lord Sinclair (d. 1755) and great-grandson of the aforementioned Matthew St Clair, uncle of the 11th Lord. He thereby became the first holder of the title without descent from the original Lords.) He was an ensign with the Royal Scots in 1784. He was made Lieutenant of the 17th Foot in 1788. He raised an independent company in 1790, which became part of the 15th Foot. He became Captain in 1791, Major in 1795, and Lt.-Col. in 1799 before his retirement in 1802. He also served as a Lt.-Col. in the Berwickshire Militia from 1803 to 1805.

Lord Sinclair in the House of Lords as a Tory Scottish representative peer from 1807 to 1859.

== Personal life ==
Lord Sinclair was twice married. His first marriage was on 13 February 1802 to Mary Agnes Chisholm (d. 1814), the only daughter of James Chisholm of Chisholm. Before her death on 16 July 1814, they were the parents of:

- James St Clair, 14th Lord Sinclair (1803–1880), who married Jane Little, eldest daughter of Archibald Little, of Shabden Park, in 1830.
- Elizabeth St Clair (1804–1812), who died young.
- Susan St Clair (1806–1856), who married Francis Dennis Massy-Dawson, eldest son and heir of James Hewitt Massy-Dawson MP, of Ballynacourte, in 1829.
- Matthew St Clair (1808–1827), who served with 84th Regiment.
- Charles St Clair (1809–1810), who died young.
- Charles St Clair (1811–1863), who married Isabella Jane Home, a daughter of William Foreman Home, in 1840. After her death in 1852, he married Anne Crawfurd Pringle, a daughter of Sir John Pringle, 5th Baronet, in 1854.

After the death of his first wife, he married Isabella Mary Chatto (d. 1875) on 18 September 1816. Isabella was the youngest daughter of Alexander Chatto of Mainhouse, Roxburgh. Together, they were the parents of:

- Eleanor St Clair (1818–1898), who died unmarried.
- Jane Elizabeth St Clair (1822–1904), married the Rev. William Leyland Feilden, Rector of Rolleston, in 1853.
- John St Clair (1820–1842), who died unmarried.

Lord Sinclair died on 30 September 1863 and was succeeded in the lordship by his eldest son James. His widow died on 5 June 1875.

Peerage of Scotland
Preceded by Andrew St Clair	Lord Sinclair; 1775–1863 (Confirmed 1782)	Succeeded by James St Clair
