= William St Clair, 6th Lord Herdmanston =

14th-century Scottish noble

William St Clair
- Predecessor: William St Clair
- Successor: John St Clair
- Noble family: Clan Sinclair

William St Clair, Lord Herdmanston, Baron of Carfrae and Cessford, was a Scottish noble of the 14th century.

William was the son of William St Clair of Herdmanston, who had fought at the Battle of Bannockburn in 1314.

== Marriage and issue ==
William married Margaret, daughter of William St Clair, Master of Roslin (died 1330), they are known to have had the following issue:

- John St Clair of Herdmanston
- James St Clair
- Walter St Clair of Cessford

After the death of William, Margaret was remarried to Thomas Stewart, Earl of Angus and Chamberlain of Scotland, in 1357.
