= John Cockburn (died 1623) =

Scottish landowner

John Cockburn of Ormiston (died 1623) was a Scottish lawyer and landowner.

== Career ==
He was the son of John Cockburn of Ormiston and Alison Sandilands (died 1584), a daughter of Sir John Sandilands of Calder. His older brother Alexander Cockburn died in 1563, his epitaph by George Buchanan recording his travels and achievements engraved on a brass plate is at the National Museum of Scotland.

John Cockburn succeeded his father as laird of Ormiston in East Lothian in 1583.

James VI came to Ormiston to hunt deer on 22 November 1588. Cockburn was a member of the Privy Council and the council ruling Scotland when James VI was in Norway and Denmark.

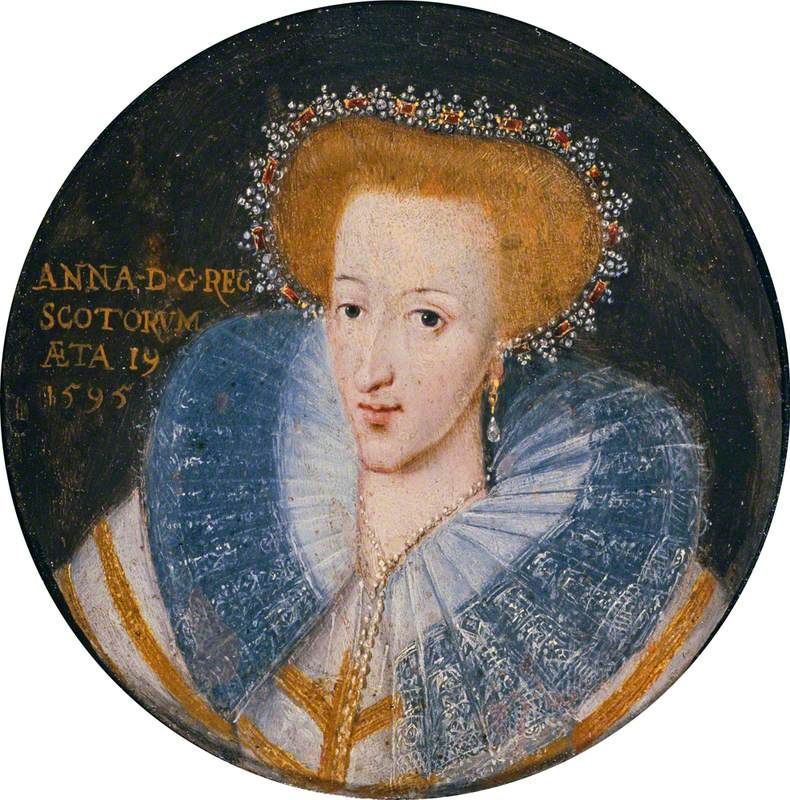
John Cockburn delivered the oath of the people of Scotland at the coronation of Anne of Denmark

He was knighted at the coronation of Anne of Denmark on 17 May 1590, where he gave an oath of loyal service on behalf of the people of Scotland. He was again honored with knighthood at Parliament in 1592.

Cockburn was Lord Justice Clerk after Lewis Bellenden. On 26 October 1591, during the North Berwick witch trials James VI gave him a commission to torture and punish those accused of witchcraft who refused to confess. Cockburn questioned David Graham of Fintry about the Spanish Blanks affair in February 1593.

An English diplomat Robert Bowes noted that Cockburn had hosted the Earls of Angus, Huntly, Errol, and Sir James Chisholme at Ormiston on 11 October 1593. The Earls met the King on the road at Fala the next day.

In December 1593, Cockburn was appointed to a committee to audit the account of money spent by the Chancellor, John Maitland of Thirlestane, on the royal voyages. The funds in question came from the English subsidy and the dowry of Anne of Denmark.

As a member of the Privy Council, Cockburn went with others to Stirling Castle in May 1603 to discuss and investigate a controversy involving Anne of Denmark who wished to take custody of her son, Prince Henry.

== Later years ==
In old age Cockburn lost his eyesight and mobility, and in December 1622 there were discussions about a replacement in the role of Lord Justice Clerk.

He died in June 1623 according to Balfour, but his will gives his date of death as October 1626.

== Marriage and family ==
He married Janet Home, a daughter of Alexander Home of Manderston, and sister of the royal favourite Sir George Home. Janet Home was one of the women invited to attend Anne of Denmark at her coronation in May 1590.

Their children included:

- Patrick Cockburn, who married Elizabeth Lawson, their son George Cockburn became laird of Ormiston
- Margaret Cockburn, who married Patrick Sinclair, 9th Lord Sinclair
- Catherine Cockburn, who married James MacGill of Cranstoun-Riddill, later made Viscount Oxenfurd
- Helen Cockburn, who married William Hay of Linplum
- Jean Cockburn, married (1) John Murray of Touchadam, (2) William Lauder of Haltoun

He married, secondly, Elizabeth Bellenden, a daughter of John Bellenden of Auchnoule and Janet Seton, and widow of James Lawson of Humbie.
