= Lord Sinclair =

British noble title

Arms of Lord Sinclair: Argent, a cross engrailed azure.

Lord Sinclair is a title in the Peerage of Scotland. According to James Balfour Paul's The Scots Peerage, volume VII published in 1910, the first person to be styled Lord Sinclair was William Sinclair, 3rd Earl of Orkney and 1st Earl of Caithness (died 1480). However, according to Roland Saint-Clair writing in the late 19th century, William Sinclair's father, Henry II Sinclair, Earl of Orkney, who died in 1420, is the first person recorded as Lord Sinclair by public records.

In 1470, William Sinclair, 3rd Earl of Orkney, 2nd Lord Sinclair and 11th Baron of Roslin surrendered the earldom of Orkney in return for the earldom of Caithness. He divided his estates: his eldest son from his first marriage, William Sinclair, 3rd Lord Sinclair, inherited the title of Lord Sinclair, while he left the Barony of Roslin to his eldest son from his second marriage, Oliver, and the earldom of Caithness to his second son from his second marriage, another William, from whom descend the chiefs of the Clan Sinclair.

William Sinclair, 3rd Lord Sinclair's son, Henry Sinclair, 4th Lord Sinclair (died 1513), was confirmed in the title in 1488 by an Act of Parliament. However, according to historian Roland Saint-Clair, this Act was only a recognition of the Barony of St. Clair existing in the person of his ancestor, Henry II Sinclair, Earl of Orkney and did not constitute a new creation. Bernard Burke, in his a Genealogical and Heraldic Dictionary of the Peerage and Baronetage of the British Empire, agrees with Roland Saint-Clair and says that Henry Sinclair (died 1513) and William Sinclair (died 1570) were "in reality" the fourth and fifth Lords Sinclair respectively. According to 18th century herald, Alexander Nisbet, the Lord Sinclair coat of arms is based on the feudal arms of the Earl of Orkney and being the lineal male heir of William Sinclair, 3rd Earl of Orkney.

On the death of the tenth Lord, the male line failed. He was succeeded by his grandson, Henry, the eleventh Lord, the son of Catherine Sinclair, Mistress of Sinclair, daughter of the tenth Lord, and her husband John Sinclair, 23rd Lord Herdmanston. In 1677, he obtained a new charter of the peerage confirming him in the title and with remainders respectively to his brother Henry Sinclair and his father's brothers Robert St Clair, George St Clair and Matthew St Clair, and failing them to his own heirs male whatsoever. However, his eldest son and heir John Sinclair, Master of Sinclair, was involved in the Jacobite rising of 1715 and attainted by Parliament. Consequently, he was not allowed to assume the title.

He died childless in 1750 when the claim to the title passed to his younger brother General James St Clair (d. 1762). However, he never assumed the title. On his death the lordship became dormant. It was to remain so until it was successfully claimed by Charles Sinclair, 13th Lord Sinclair, who was confirmed in the title by the House of Lords in 1782. He was the son of Andrew St Clair, de jure 12th Lord Sinclair, grandson of Charles Sinclair, de jure 11th Lord Sinclair (d. 1755) and great-grandson of the aforementioned Matthew St Clair, uncle of the tenth Lord. He thereby became the first holder of the title without descent from the original Lords. The thirteenth Lord, his son the fourteenth Lord, grandson the fifteenth Lord, great-grandson the sixteenth Lord, and great-great-grandson the seventeenth Lord, all sat in the House of Lords as Scottish representative peer. As of 2016, the title is held by the latter's only son, the eighteenth Lord, who succeeded on his father's death in 2004.

The University College London research project The Legacies of British Slave-ownership and the records of the Slave Compensation Commission, highlights that Charles St Clair, 13th Lord Sinclair owned 666 slaves at the time of abolition in 1833. He gained £5,411 as compensation from the government of the United Kingdom and Great Britain, (approximately £458,000 in 2015).

The family house is Knocknalling House, near St John's Town of Dalry, Kirkcudbrightshire.

== Lords Sinclair (1449) ==
- Henry II Sinclair, Earl of Orkney, 10th Baron of Roslin and the 1st Lord Sinclair (d. 1420)
- William Sinclair, 3rd Earl of Orkney, 1st Earl of Caithness, 11th Baron of Roslin and 2nd Lord Sinclair (d. 1480)
- William Sinclair, 3rd Lord Sinclair (d. 1487)
- Henry Sinclair, 4th Lord Sinclair (d. 1513)
- William Sinclair, 5th Lord Sinclair (d. 1570)
- Henry Sinclair, 6th Lord Sinclair (1528–1601)
- Henry Sinclair, 7th Lord Sinclair (1581–1602)
- James Sinclair, 8th Lord Sinclair (d. 1607)
- Patrick Sinclair, 9th Lord Sinclair (d. 1617)
- John Sinclair, 10th Lord Sinclair (1610–1676)
  - Catherine Sinclair, Mistress of Sinclair.

=== Herdmanston line ===
- Henry St Clair, 11th Lord Sinclair (1660–1723). Eldest son of Catherine Sinclair, daughter of John Sinclair, 10th Lord Sinclair, and her husband John Sinclair, 23rd Lord Herdmanston (eldest son of John Sinclair, 22nd Lord Herdmanston). It is not known if the Sinclair Lords Herdmanston share a paternal ancestor with the Lords Sinclair who are descended from the Sinclair Barons of Roslin.
  - John St Clair, Master of Sinclair (1683–1750) (eldest son of eleventh Lord; attainted in 1715 and never allowed to assume title)
  - James St Clair (d. 1762) (younger son of eleventh Lord; never assumed title)

dormant 1762–1782

- Charles St Clair, de jure 11th Lord Sinclair (d. 1775)
- Andrew St Clair, de jure 12th Lord Sinclair (1733–1775)
- Charles St Clair, 13th Lord Sinclair (1768–1863) (confirmed in title 1782)
- James St Clair, 14th Lord Sinclair (1803–1880)
- Charles William St Clair, 15th Lord Sinclair (1831–1922)
- Archibald James Murray St Clair, 16th Lord Sinclair (1875–1957)
- Charles Murray Kennedy St Clair, 17th Lord Sinclair (1914–2004)
- Matthew Murray Kennedy St Clair, 18th Lord Sinclair (b. 1968) Lord Sinclair was appointed Lord Lieutenant of Kirkcudbright on 29 July 2021.

The heir apparent is the present holder's son Harry Murray Kennedy St. Clair, Master of Sinclair (b. 2007).
