= List of Scottish representative peers =

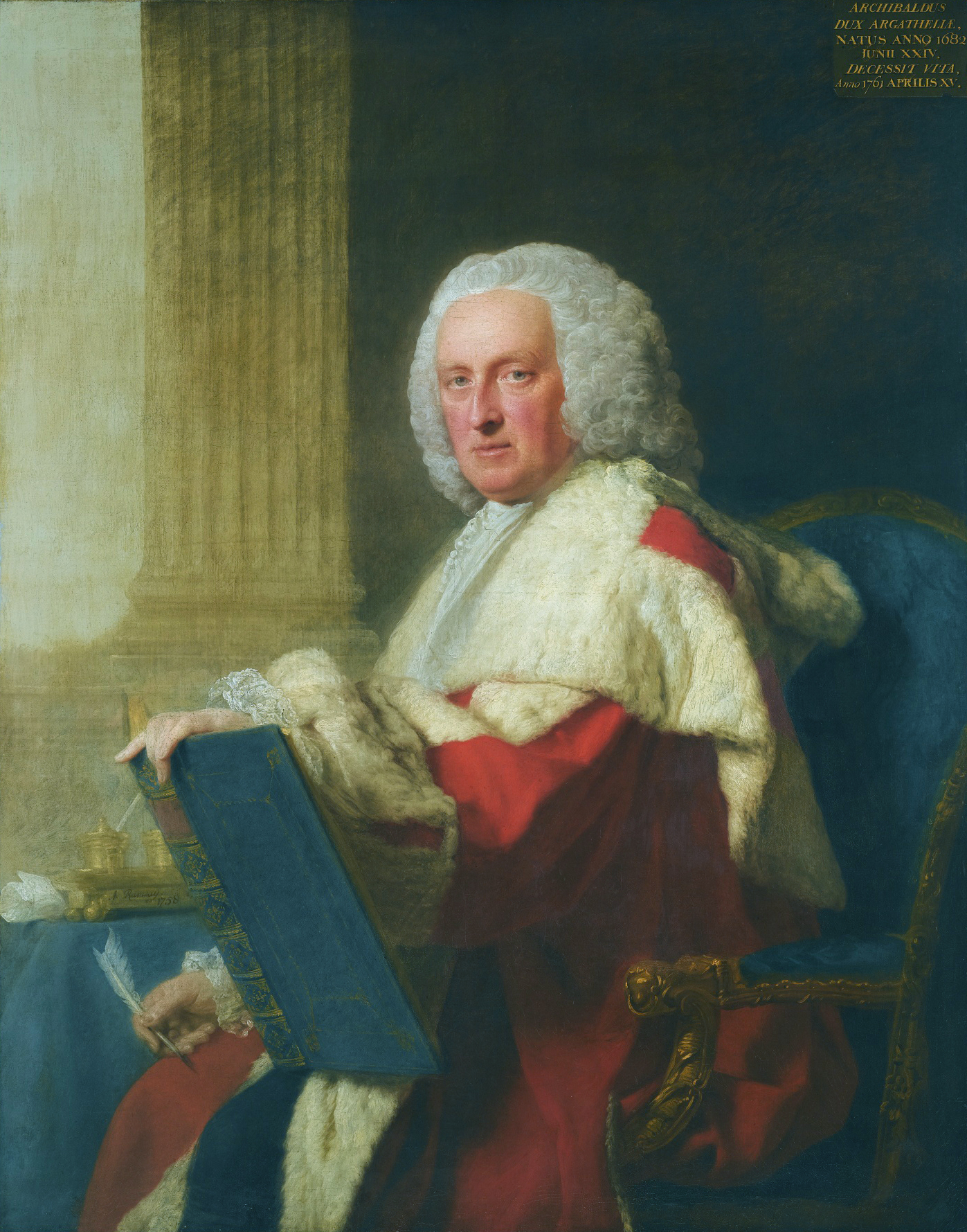
Archibald Campbell, 3rd Duke of Argyll, a Scottish representative peer 1707 to 1713, 1715 to 1761.

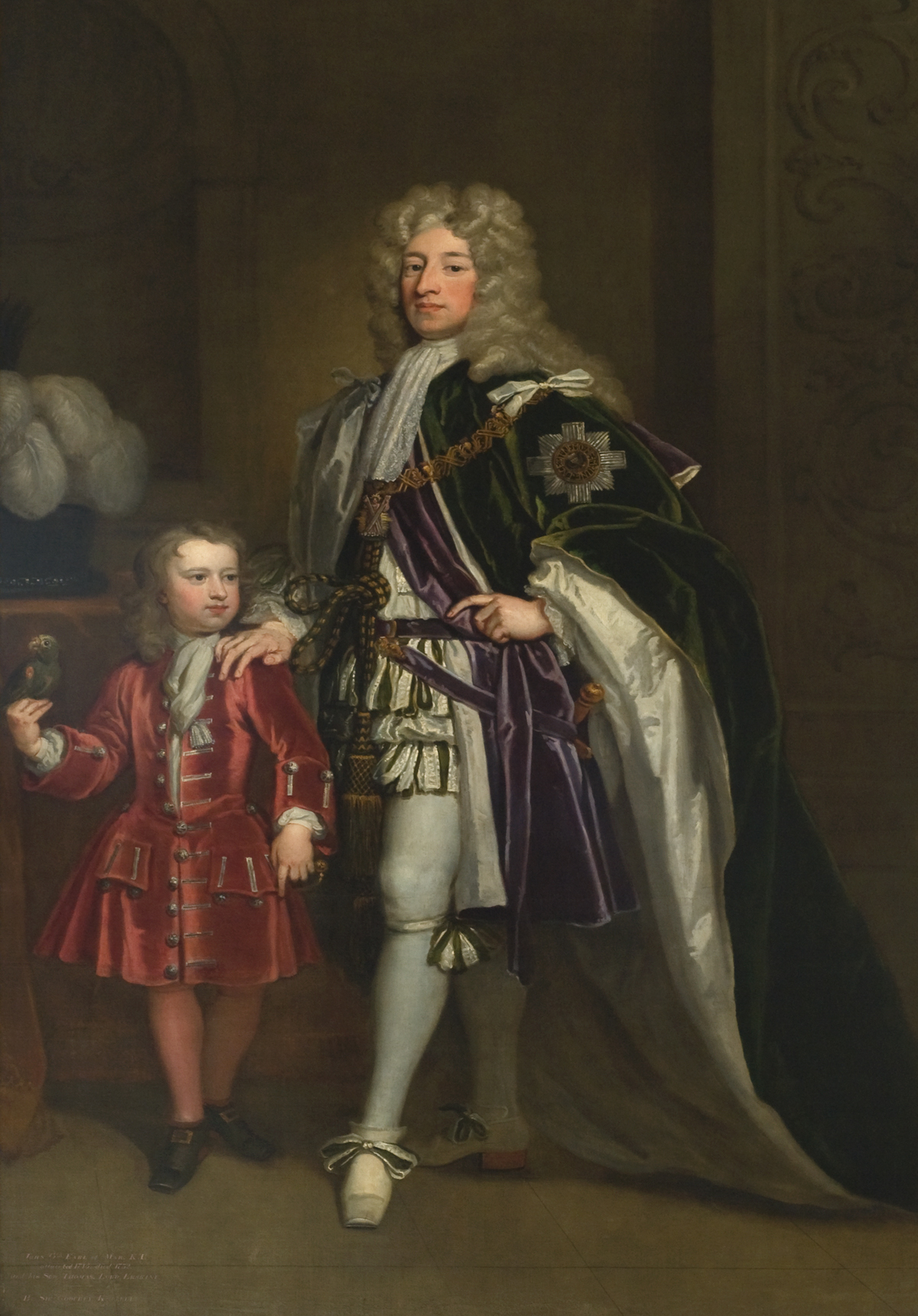
The Earl of Mar, a Scottish representative peer between 1707 and 1715.

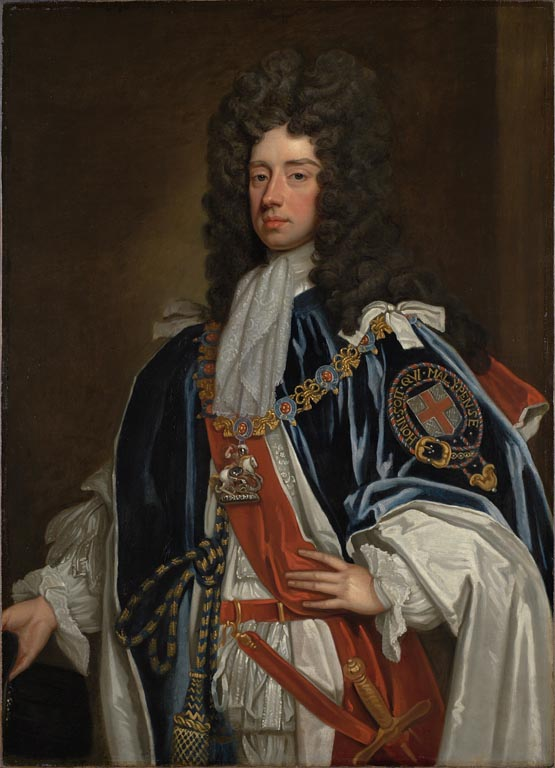
The 2nd Duke of Queensberry, a Scottish representative peer between 1707 and 1708.

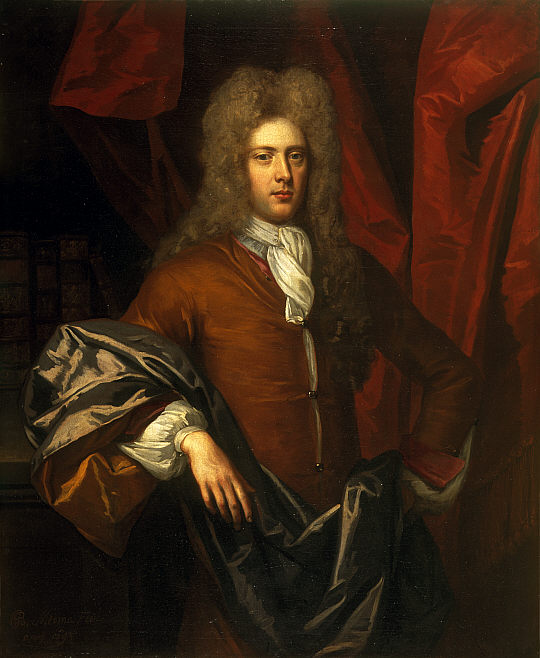
The 1st Earl of Seafield, later 4th Earl of Findlater, a Scottish representative peer between 1707 and 1710, 1712 and 1715 and 1722 and 1730.

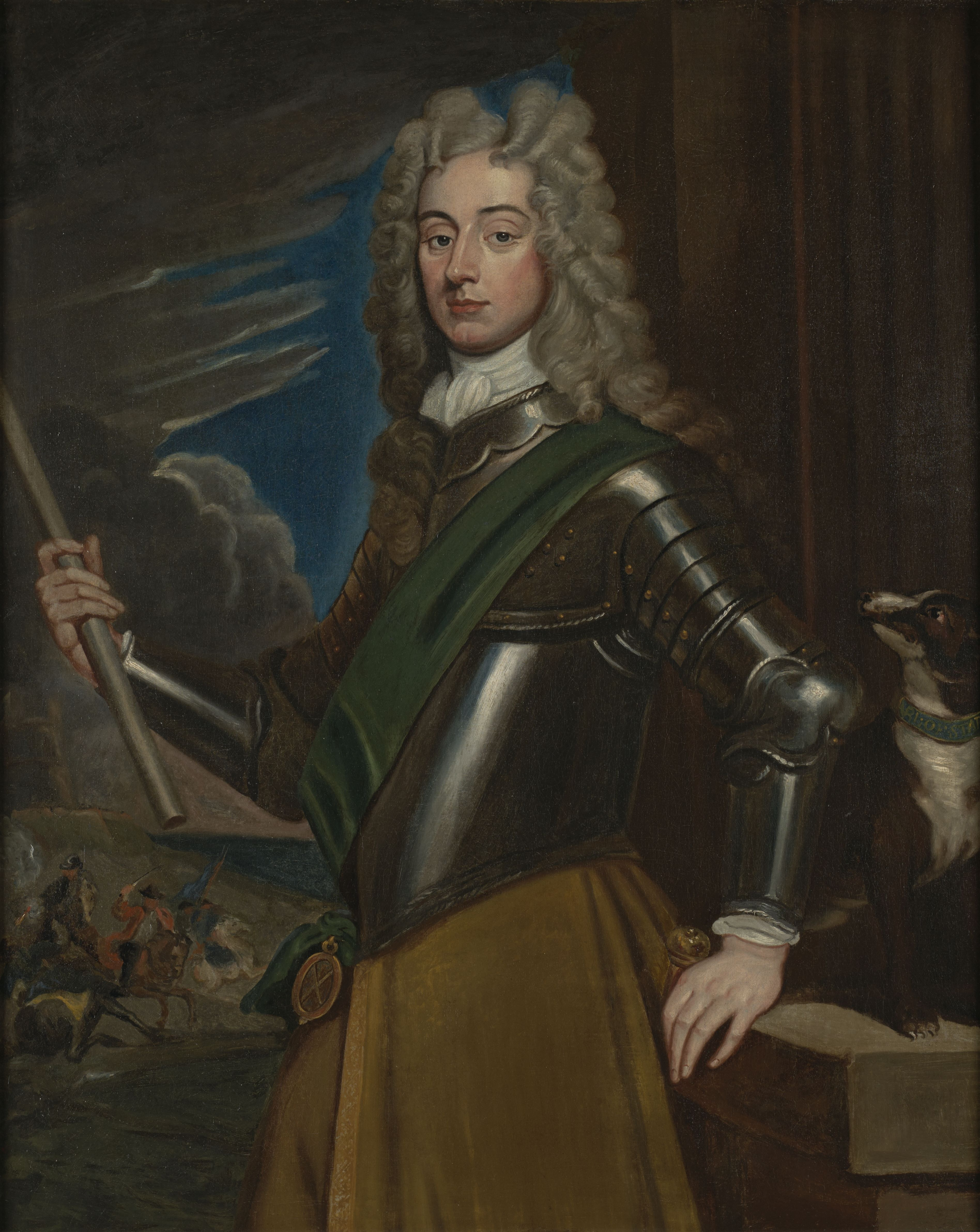
The 2nd Earl of Stair, a Scottish representative peer between 1707 and 1708, 1715 and 1734 and 1744 and 1747.

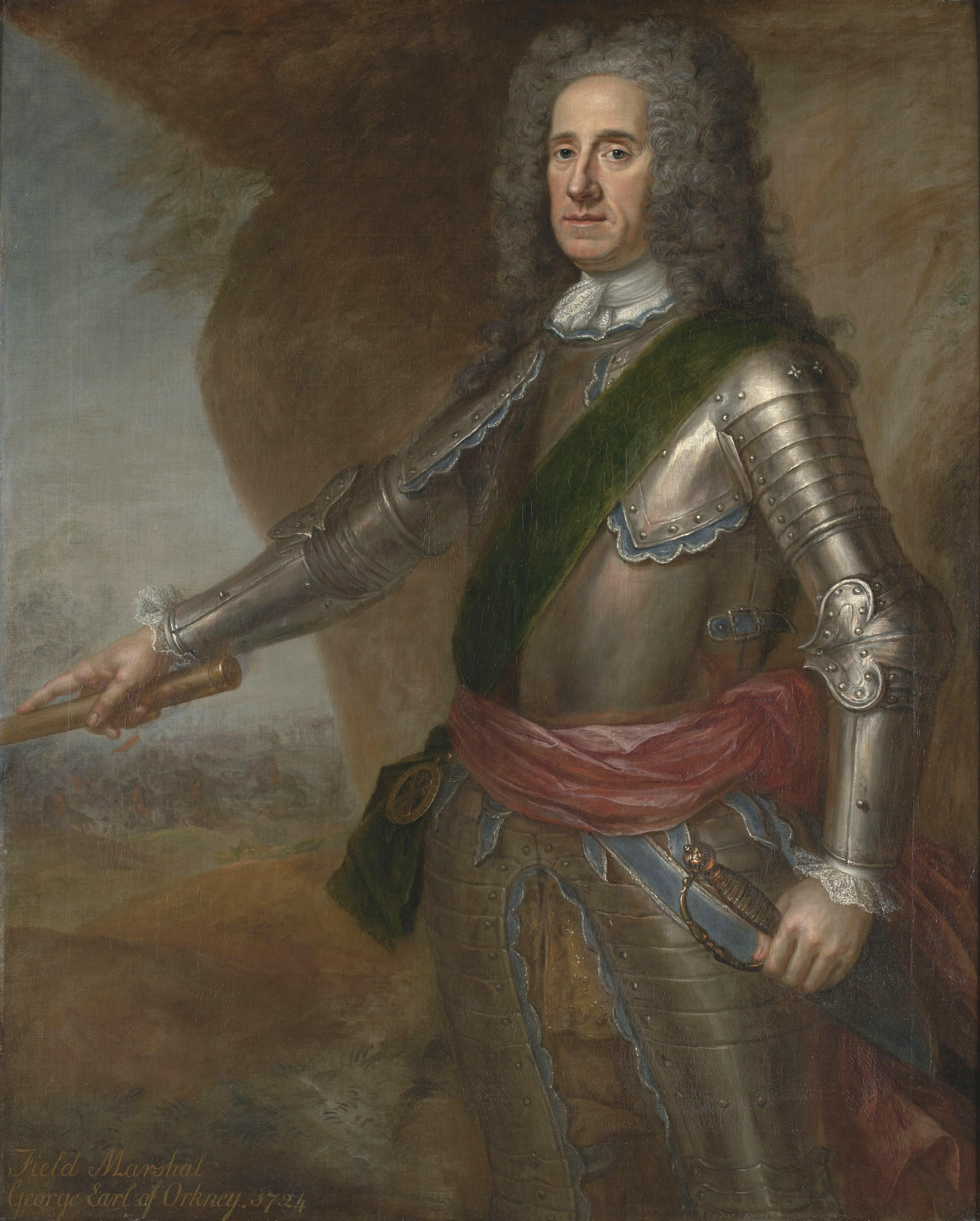
The 1st Earl of Orkney, a Scottish representative peer between 1708 and 1737.

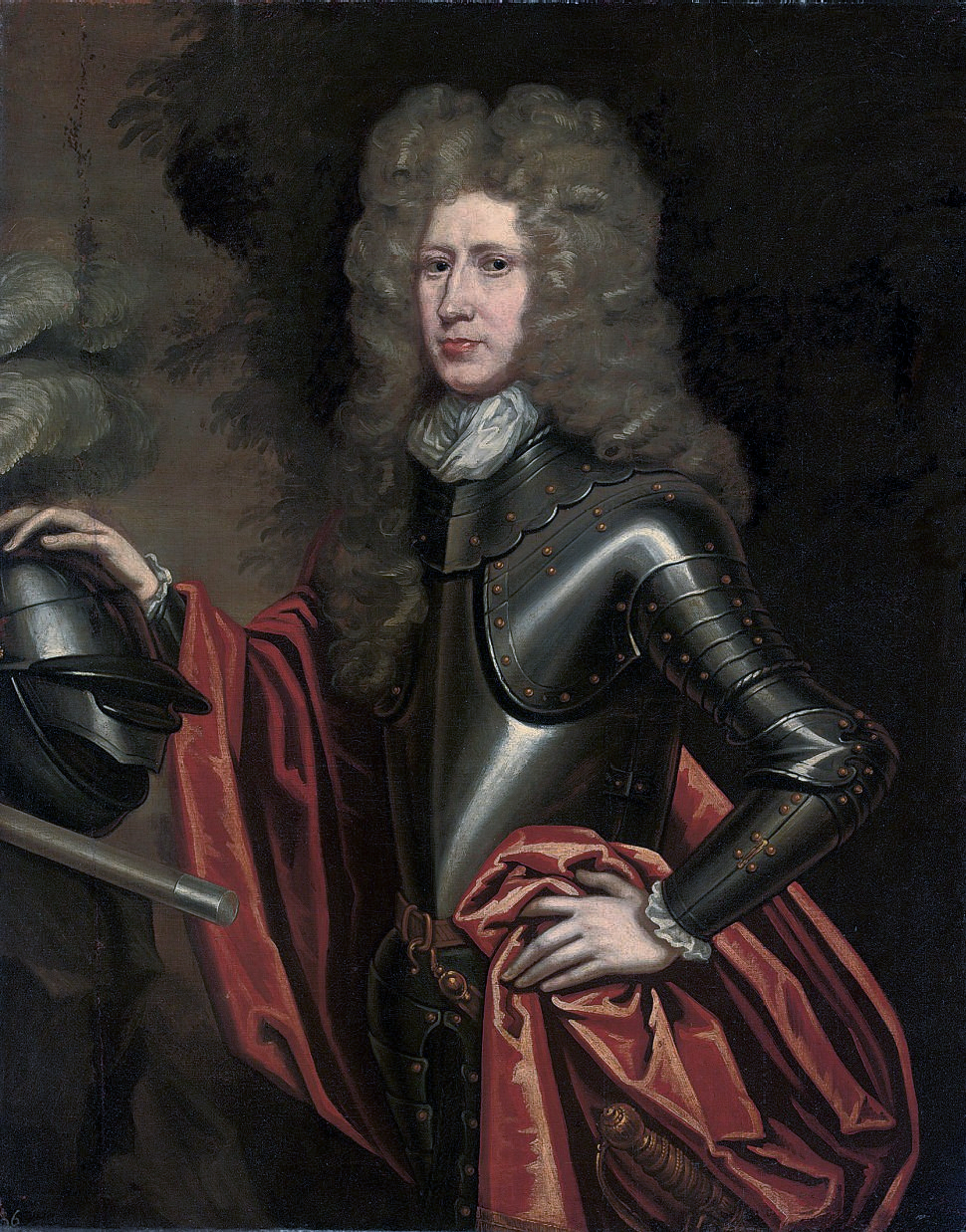
The 9th Earl Marischal, a Scottish representative peer between 1710 and 1712.

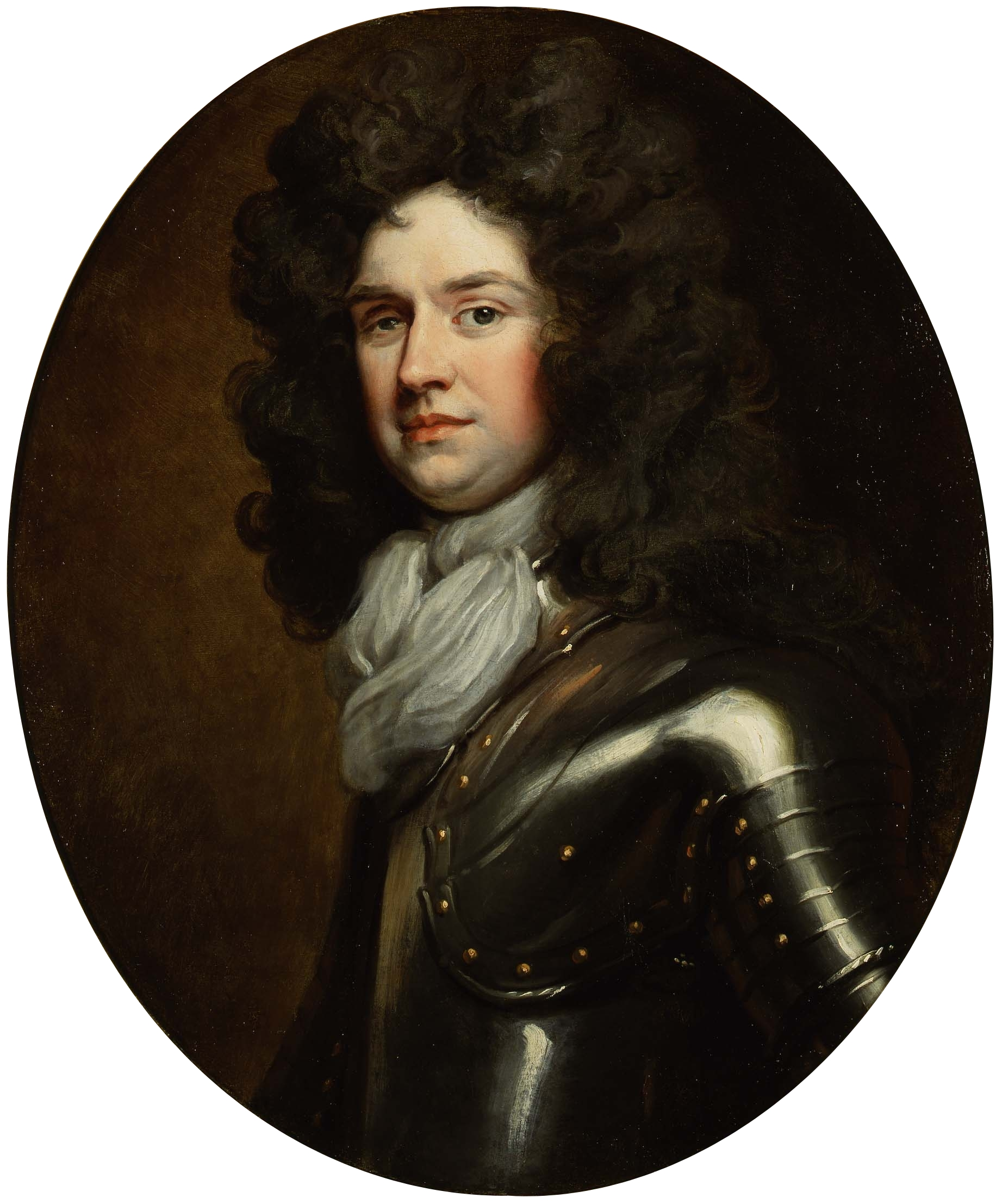
The 1st Earl of Portmore, a Scottish representative peer between 1713 and 1715.

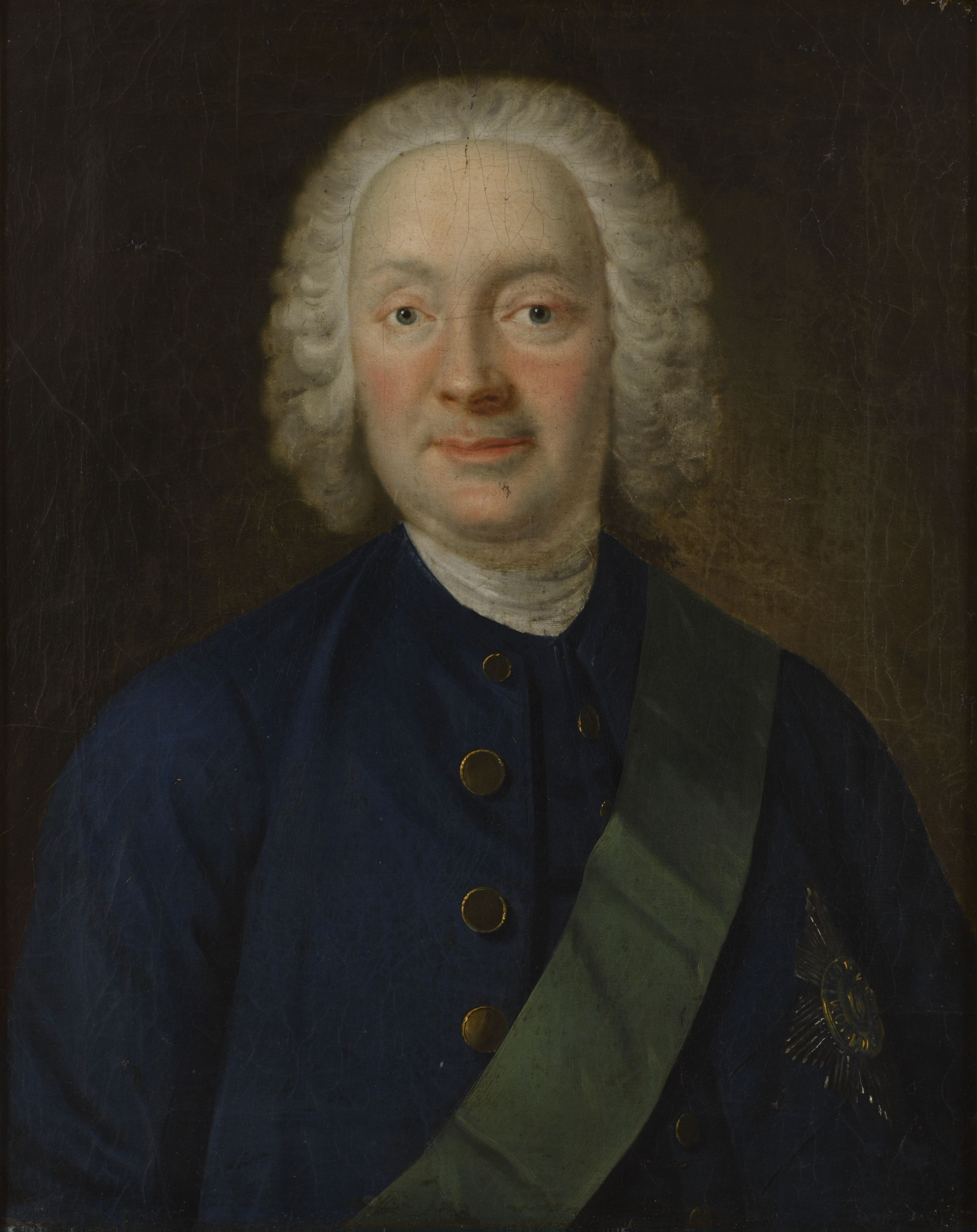
The 3rd Earl of Hyndford, a Scottish representative peer between 1738 and 1767.

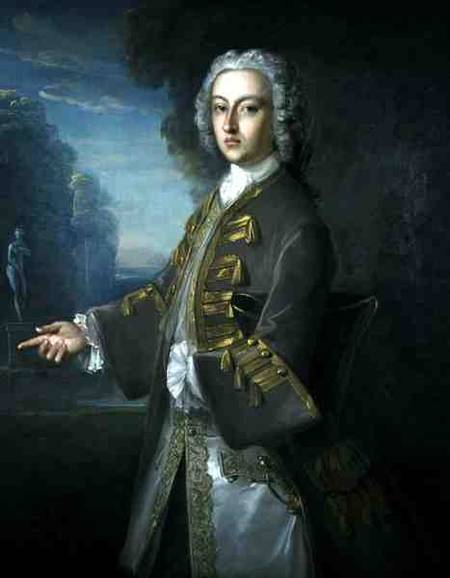
The 3rd Duke of Gordon, a Scottish representative peer between 1747 and 1752.

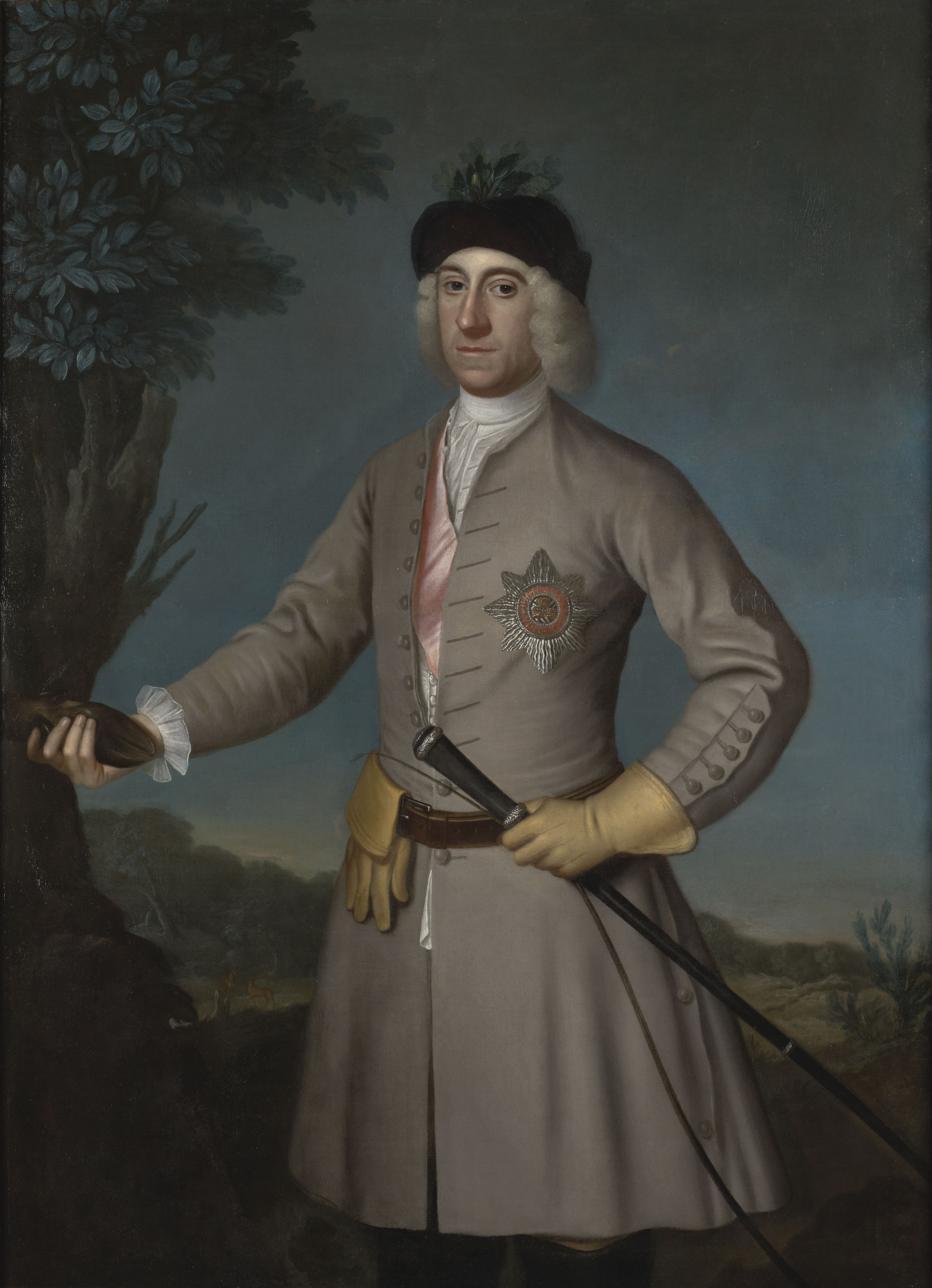
The 3rd Earl of Breadalbane, a Scottish representative peer between 1752 and 1768.

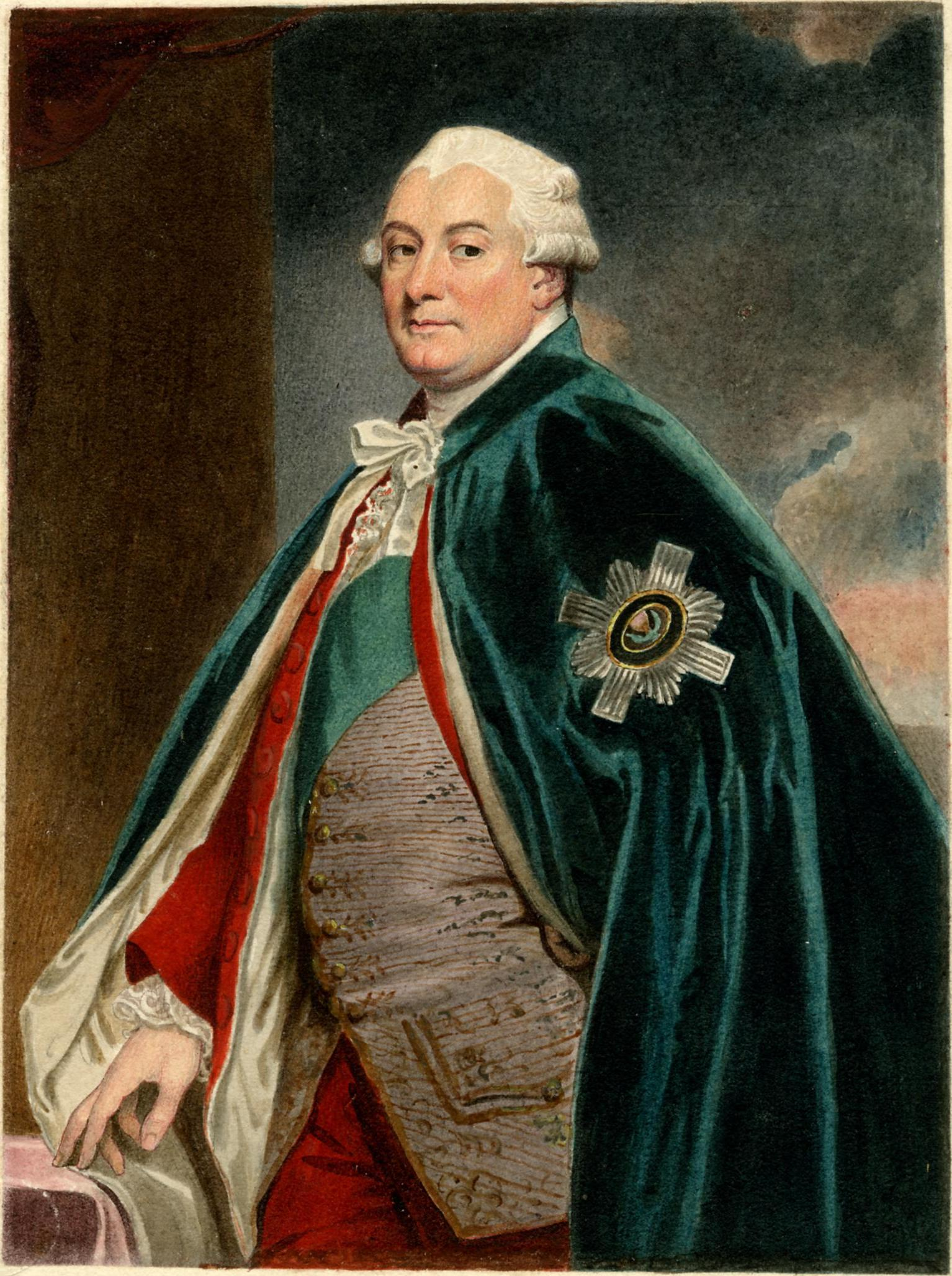
The 7th Viscount of Stormont, later 2nd Earl of Mansfield, a Scottish representative peer between 1754 and 1796.

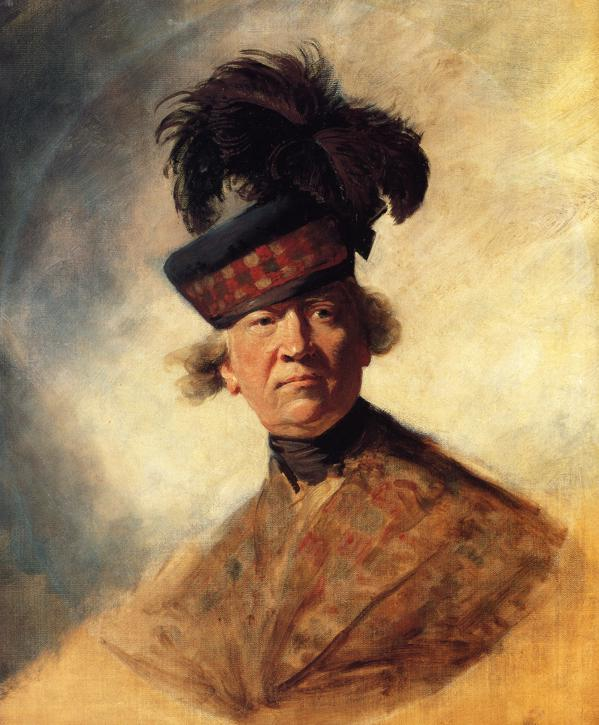
The 11th Earl of Eglinton, a Scottish representative peer between 1776 and 1796.

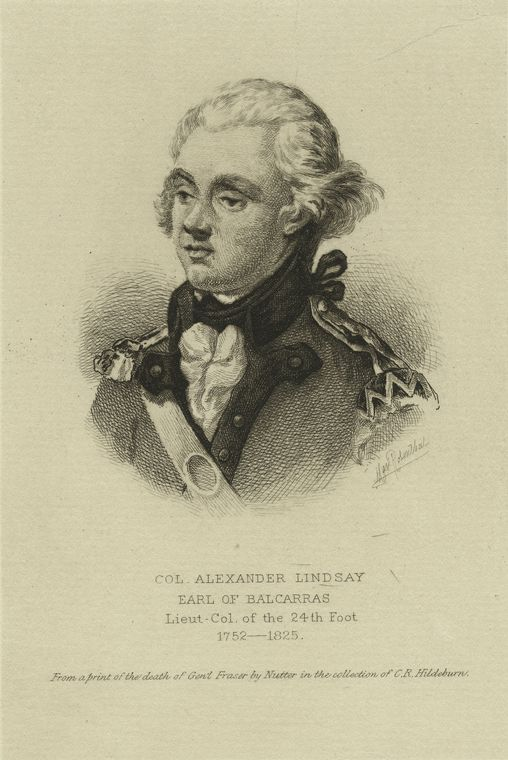
The 6th Earl of Balcarres, a Scottish representative peer between 1784 and 1796 and 1802 and 1825.

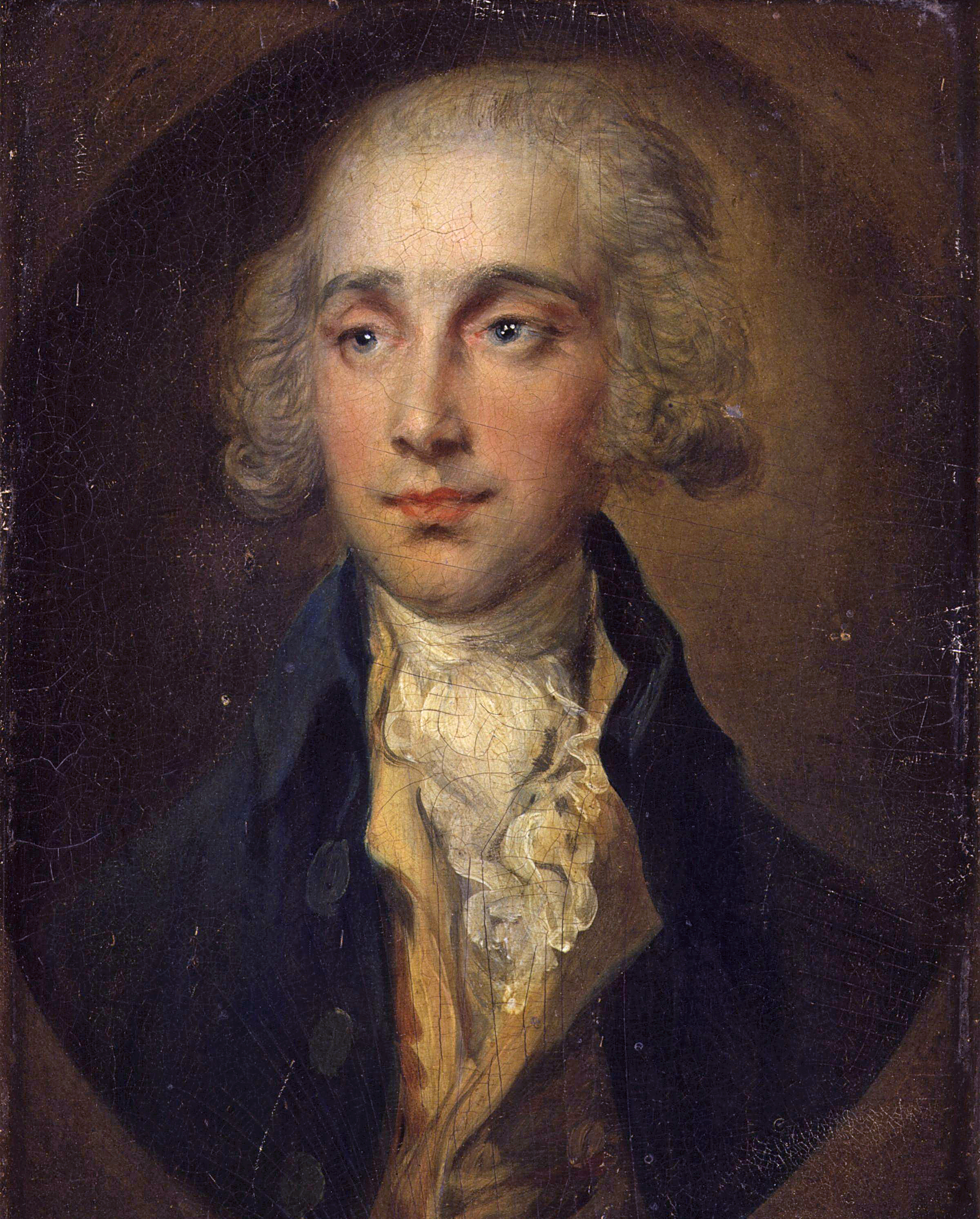
The 8th Earl of Lauderdale, a Scottish representative peer between 1790 and 1796.

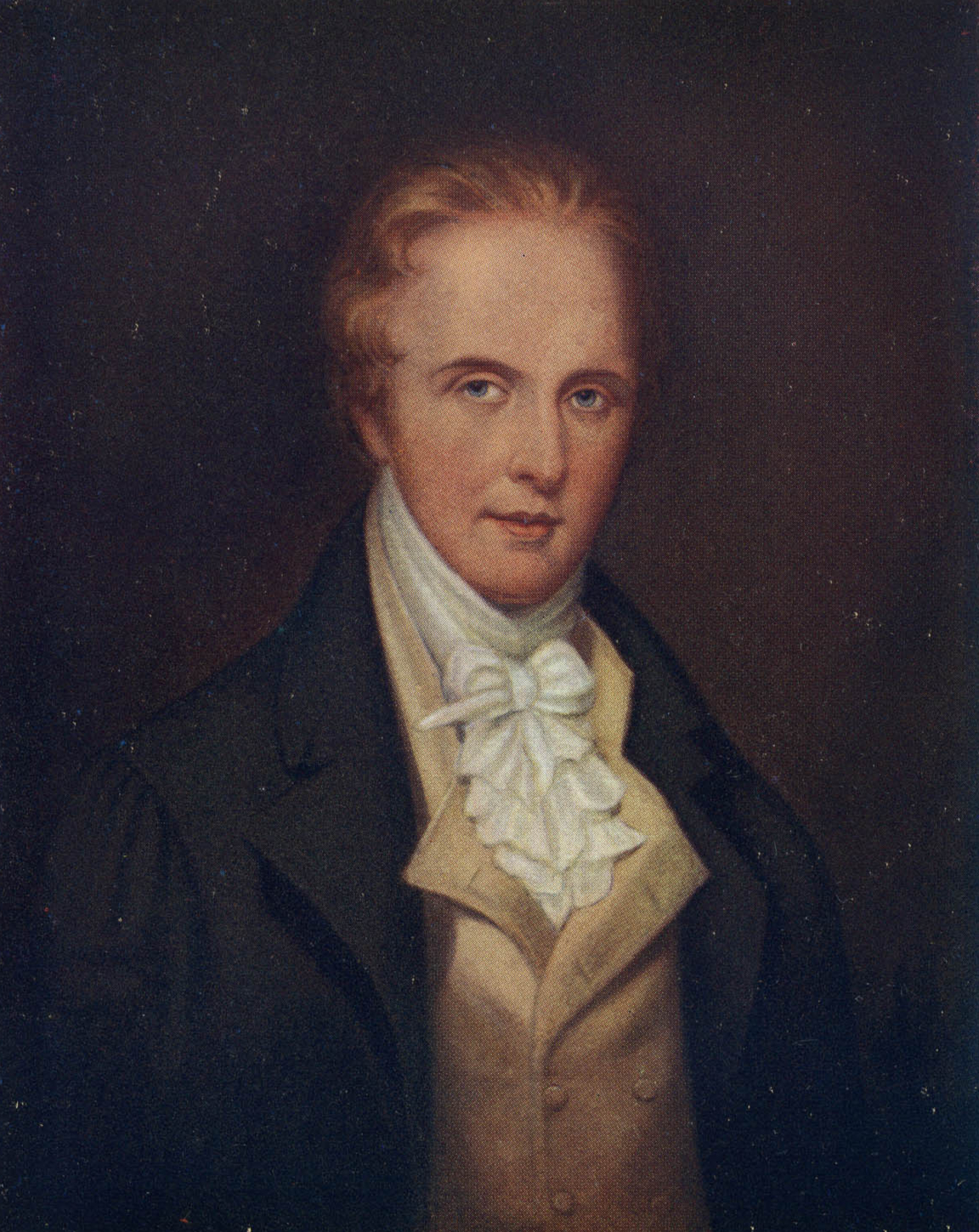
The 5th Earl of Selkirk, a Scottish representative peer between 1806 and 1818.

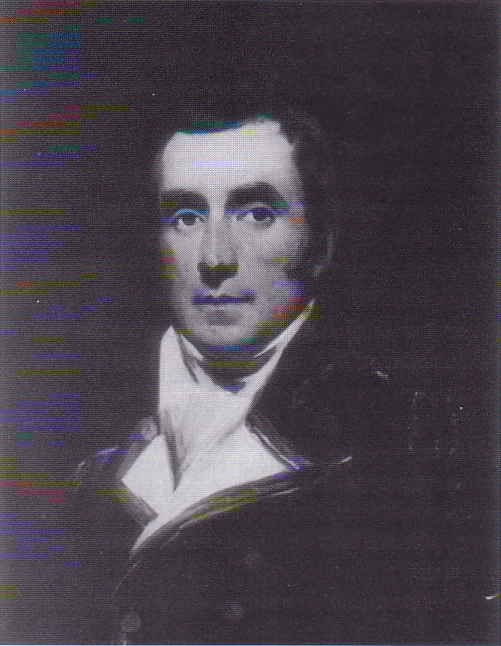
The 9th Lord Napier, a Scottish representative peer between 1824 and 1832.

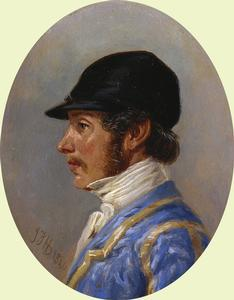
The 12th Earl of Strathmore and Kinghorne, a Scottish representative peer between 1852 and 1865.

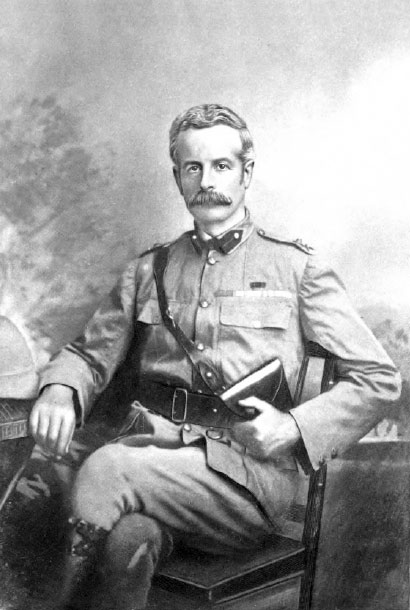
The 12th Earl of Dundonald, a Scottish representative peer between 1886 and 1922.

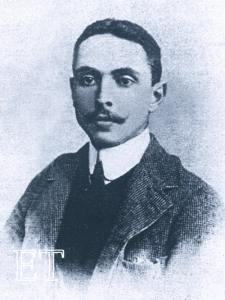
The 19th Earl of Rothes, a Scottish representative peer between 1906 and 1923.

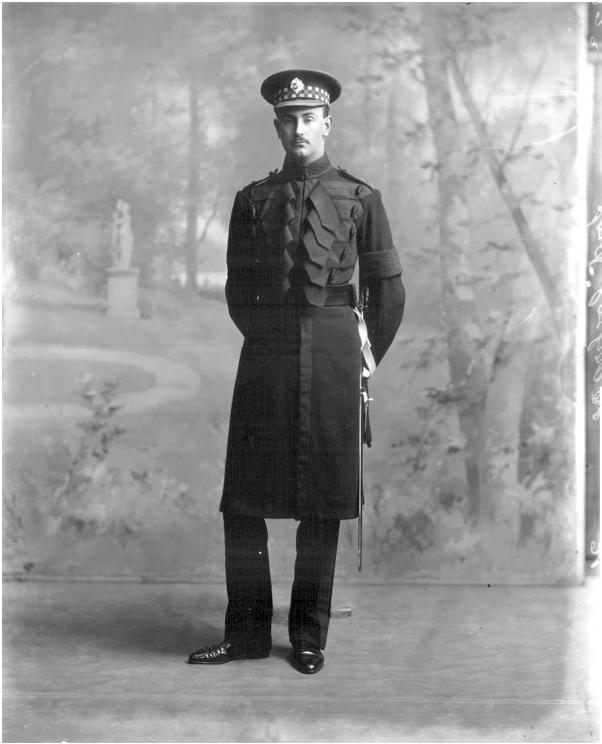
The 13th Earl of Dundonald, a Scottish representative peer between 1941 and 1955.

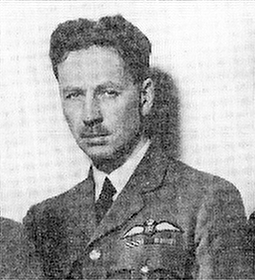
The 10th Earl of Selkirk, a Scottish representative peer between 1945 and 1963.

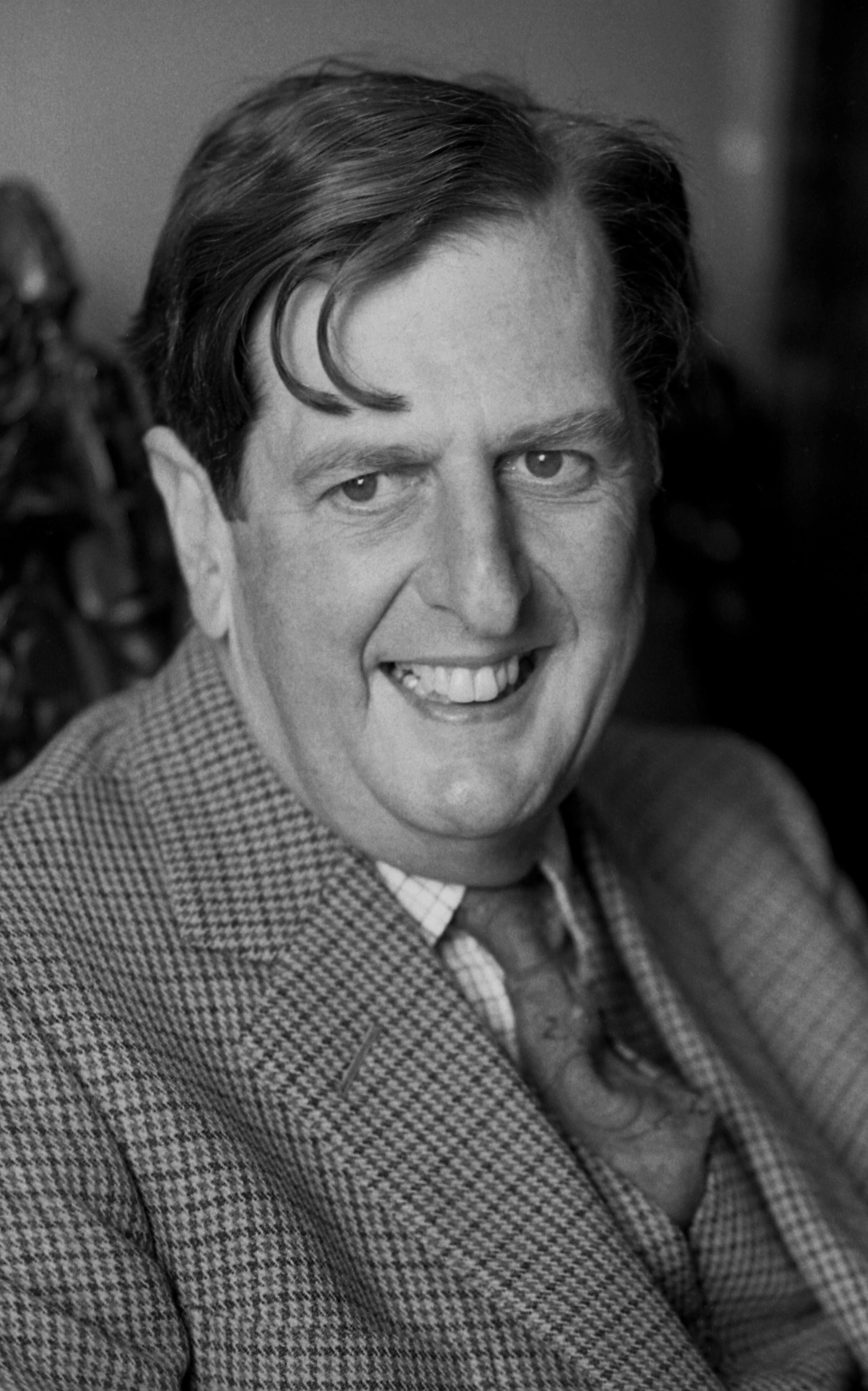
The 10th Duke of Atholl, a Scottish representative peer between 1958 and 1963.

This is a list of representative peers elected from the Peerage of Scotland to sit in the House of Lords after the Acts of Union 1707 abolished the unicameral Parliament of Scotland, where all Scottish Peers had been entitled to sit.

From 1707 to 1963 the House of Lords included sixteen Scottish representative peers, elected from among the peerage of Scotland to sit for one parliament. After each dissolution of parliament, a new election of representative peers from Scotland took place. This continued even after the addition of Irish representative peers, who held their seats in the Lords for life.

Under the Peerage Act 1963 which came into effect in August that year, all Scottish peers were given seats in the House of Lords as of right, thus after that date no further Scottish representative peers were needed.

== List of Scottish representative peers ==
=== 1707–1749 ===
Representative peer	Elected	Ceased
John Lindsay, 19th Earl of Crawford	13 February 1707	21 September 1710
David Boyle, 1st Earl of Glasgow	13 February 1707	21 September 1710
Archibald Campbell, 1st Earl of Ilay (1st time)	13 February 1707	8 August 1713
David Leslie, 3rd Earl of Leven	13 February 1707	21 September 1710
William Kerr, 2nd Marquess of Lothian	13 February 1707	3 February 1709
Hugh Campbell, 3rd Earl of Loudoun	13 February 1707	20 November 1731
John Erskine, Earl of Mar	13 February 1707	5 January 1715
James Graham, 1st Duke of Montrose	13 February 1707	21 September 1710
James Douglas, 2nd Duke of Queensberry (Peerage)	13 February 1707	15 April 1708
Archibald Primrose, 1st Earl of Rosebery	13 February 1707	5 January 1715
John Ker, 1st Duke of Roxburghe	13 February 1707	21 September 1710
James Ogilvy, 1st Earl of Seafield (1st time)	13 February 1707	21 September 1710
John Dalrymple, 2nd Earl of Stair (1st time)	13 February 1707	15 April 1708
John Gordon, 16th Earl of Sutherland	13 February 1707	15 April 1708
John Hay, 2nd Marquess of Tweeddale	13 February 1707	15 April 1708
David Wemyss, 4th Earl of Wemyss	13 February 1707	21 September 1710
James Hamilton, 4th Duke of Hamilton (Note: As an incumbent Representative Peer, the Peer was an automatic seat in the House of Lords which a peerage of Great Britain and United Kingdom was created.)	17 June 1708	15 November 1712
David Carnegie, 4th Earl of Northesk	17 June 1708	5 January 1715
George Hamilton, 1st Earl of Orkney	17 June 1708	29 January 1737
John Hamilton-Leslie, 9th Earl of Rothes	17 June 1708	21 September 1710
William Johnstone, 1st Marquess of Annandale (1st time)	3 February 1709	8 August 1713
John Murray, 1st Duke of Atholl	10 November 1710	5 January 1715
John Elphinstone, 4th Lord Balmerino	10 November 1710	5 January 1715
Walter Stuart, 6th Lord Blantyre	10 November 1710	23 June 1713
Alexander Montgomerie, 9th Earl of Eglinton	10 November 1710	5 January 1715
Alexander Home, 7th Earl of Home	10 November 1710	8 August 1713
William Livingston, 3rd Viscount of Kilsyth	10 November 1710	5 January 1715
Thomas Hay, 7th Earl of Kinnoull	10 November 1710	5 January 1715
William Keith, 9th Earl Marischal	10 November 1710	27 May 1712
James Ogilvy, 1st Earl of Seafield (2nd time)	14 August 1712	5 January 1715
James Livingston, 5th Earl of Linlithgow	13 January 1713	8 October 1713
John Campbell, 1st Earl of Breadalbane and Holland	8 October 1713	5 January 1715
John Cochrane, 4th Earl of Dundonald	8 October 1713	5 January 1715
John Murray, 2nd Earl of Dunmore (1st time)	8 October 1713	5 January 1715
David Colyear, 1st Earl of Portmore	8 October 1713	5 January 1715
Charles Douglas, 2nd Earl of Selkirk (1st time)	8 October 1713	5 January 1715
William Johnstone, 1st Marquess of Annandale (2nd time)	3 March 1715	14 January 1721
John Hamilton, 3rd Lord Belhaven and Stenton	3 March 1715	27 November 1721
David Erskine, 9th Earl of Buchan	3 March 1715	17 April 1734
James Stuart, 2nd Earl of Bute	3 March 1715	28 January 1723
Henry Scott, 1st Earl of Deloraine	3 March 1715	25 December 1730
Archibald Campbell, 1st Earl of Ilay (2nd time)	3 March 1715	20 March 1761
William Ross, 12th Lord Ross	3 March 1715	10 March 1722
John Dalrymple, 2nd Earl of Stair (2nd time)	3 March 1715	17 April 1734
John Sutherland, 16th Earl of Sutherland	3 March 1715	27 June 1733
Charles Hay, 3rd Marquess of Tweeddale	3 March 1715	17 December 1715
Thomas Hamilton, 6th Earl of Haddington	28 February 1716	17 April 1734
William Gordon, 2nd Earl of Aberdeen	1 June 1721	5 August 1727
Charles Hope, 1st Earl of Hopetoun	21 April 1722	26 February 1742
Charles Douglas, 2nd Earl of Selkirk (2nd time)	21 April 1722	13 March 1739
John Hay, 4th Marquess of Tweeddale (2nd time)	21 April 1722	17 April 1734
James Ogilvy, 1st Earl of Seafield (3rd time)	15 August 1722	19 August 1730
John Leslie, 10th Earl of Rothes (1st time)	13 June 1723	17 April 1734
John Murray, 2nd Earl of Dunmore (2nd time)	20 September 1727	18 April 1752
Alexander Hume-Campbell, 2nd Earl of Marchmont	20 September 1727	17 April 1734
William Kerr, 3rd Marquess of Lothian	19 February 1730	20 March 1761
George Douglas, 13th Earl of Morton	17 November 1730	4 January 1738
John Lindsay, 20th Earl of Crawford	28 January 1732	24 December 1749
James Murray, 2nd Duke of Atholl	21 September 1733	27 April 1741
Alexander Lindsay, 4th Earl of Balcarres	4 June 1734	25 July 1736
Francis Scott, 2nd Duke of Buccleuch	4 June 1734	27 April 1741
Charles Cathcart, 8th Lord Cathcart	4 June 1734	20 December 1740
James Ogilvy, 5th Earl of Findlater	4 June 1734	20 March 1761
John Campbell, 4th Earl of Loudoun	4 June 1734	27 April 1782
Charles Colyear, 2nd Earl of Portmore	4 June 1734	18 June 1747
William Sutherland, 17th Earl of Sutherland	4 June 1734	18 June 1747
John Campbell, 2nd Earl of Breadalbane and Holland	22 October 1736	18 June 1747
John Stuart, 3rd Earl of Bute (1st time)	14 April 1737	27 April 1741
John Carmichael, 3rd Earl of Hyndford (1st time)	14 March 1738	20 March 1761
James Douglas, 14th Earl of Morton	12 May 1739	12 October 1768
William Home, 8th Earl of Home	13 June 1741	28 April 1761
Charles Maitland, 6th Earl of Lauderdale	13 June 1741	15 July 1744
James Stuart, 8th Earl of Moray	13 June 1741	5 July 1767
James Somerville, 13th Lord Somerville	13 June 1741	18 June 1747
John Hay, 4th Marquess of Tweeddale (1st time)	30 April 1742	9 December 1762
John Dalrymple, 2nd Earl of Stair (3rd time)	12 October 1744	9 May 1747
George Gordon, 3rd Earl of Aberdeen (1st time)	1 August 1747	20 March 1761
Cosmo Gordon, 3rd Duke of Gordon	1 August 1747	5 August 1752
James Maitland, 7th Earl of Lauderdale (1st time)	1 August 1747	20 March 1761
Alexander Leslie, 5th Earl of Leven	1 August 1747	8 April 1754
John Leslie, 10th Earl of Rothes (2nd time)	1 August 1747	10 December 1767

=== 1750–1799 ===
Representative peer	Elected	Ceased
Hugh Hume-Campbell, 3rd Earl of Marchmont	15 March 1750	25 March 1784
John Campbell, 3rd Earl of Breadalbane and Holland (1st time)	9 July 1752	11 March 1768
Charles Cathcart, 9th Lord Cathcart	16 November 1752	14 August 1776
David Murray, 7th Viscount Stormont	21 May 1754	20 May 1796
James Hamilton, 8th Earl of Abercorn (Peerage)	5 May 1761	14 February 1787
John Campbell, 4th Duke of Argyll	5 May 1761	9 November 1770
John Stuart, 3rd Earl of Bute (2nd time)	5 May 1761	1 September 1780
John Murray, 4th Earl of Dunmore (1st time)	5 May 1761	30 September 1774
Alexander Montgomerie, 10th Earl of Eglinton	5 May 1761	24 October 1769
William Douglas, 3rd Earl of March	5 May 1761	14 February 1787
John Carmichael, 3rd Earl of Hyndford (2nd time)	12 August 1761	19 July 1767
William Sutherland, 18th Earl of Sutherland	8 March 1763	16 June 1766
John Murray, 3rd Duke of Atholl	21 August 1766	5 November 1774
Alexander Gordon, 4th Duke of Gordon (Peerage)	1 October 1767	25 March 1784
John Bowes, 9th Earl of Strathmore and Kinghorne	1 October 1767	7 March 1776
Charles Ingram, 9th Viscount Irvine	26 April 1768	27 June 1778
Neil Primrose, 3rd Earl of Rosebery	26 April 1768	25 March 1784
William Kerr, 4th Marquess of Lothian	21 December 1768	30 September 1774
James Hay, 15th Earl of Erroll	17 January 1770	30 September 1774
John Dalrymple, 5th Earl of Stair	2 January 1771	30 September 1774
George Gordon, 3rd Earl of Aberdeen (2nd time)	15 November 1774	11 June 1790
John Campbell, 3rd Earl of Breadalbane and Holland (2nd time)	15 November 1774	1 September 1780
Thomas Kennedy, 9th Earl of Cassilis	15 November 1774	30 November 1775
George Ramsay, 8th Earl of Dalhousie	15 November 1774	15 November 1787
John Stewart, 7th Earl of Galloway (Peerage)	15 November 1774	11 June 1790
John Murray, 4th Earl of Dunmore (2nd time)	24 January 1776	11 June 1790
Archibald Montgomerie, 11th Earl of Eglinton	13 June 1776	20 May 1796
David Kennedy, 10th Earl of Cassilis	14 November 1776	11 June 1790
William Kerr, 5th Marquess of Lothian	24 September 1778	11 June 1790
John Murray, 4th Duke of Atholl (Peerage)	17 October 1780	25 March 1784
James Cunningham, 13th Earl of Glencairn	17 October 1780	25 March 1784
James Maitland, 7th Earl of Lauderdale (2nd time)	24 July 1782	25 March 1784
Alexander Lindsay, 6th Earl of Balcarres (1st time)	8 May 1784	20 May 1796
John Campbell, 4th Earl of Breadalbane and Holland (Peerage)	8 May 1784	24 October 1806
John Elphinstone, 11th Lord Elphinstone (1st time)	8 May 1784	19 August 1794
James Hope-Johnstone, 3rd Earl of Hopetoun (1st time)	8 May 1784	11 June 1790
Francis Stuart, 9th Earl of Moray (Peerage)	8 May 1784	20 May 1796
George Douglas, 16th Earl of Morton (Peerage)	8 May 1784	11 June 1790
George Kinnaird, 7th Lord Kinnaird	28 March 1787	11 June 1790
Dunbar Douglas, 4th Earl of Selkirk (1st time)	28 March 1787	11 June 1790
William Cathcart, 10th Lord Cathcart	10 January 1788	29 September 1812
Patrick McDouall-Crichton, 6th Earl of Dumfries	24 July 1790	7 April 1803
Thomas Bruce, 7th Earl of Elgin (1st time)	24 July 1790	29 April 1807
George Boyle, 4th Earl of Glasgow	24 July 1790	10 June 1818
Archibald Erskine, 7th Earl of Kellie	24 July 1790	20 May 1796
James Maitland, 8th Earl of Lauderdale (Peerage)	24 July 1790	20 May 1796
James Sandilands, 9th Lord Torphichen	24 July 1790	29 June 1802
Dunbar Douglas, 4th Earl of Selkirk (2nd time)	10 June 1793	20 May 1796
John Dalrymple, 6th Earl of Stair (1st time)	10 June 1793	29 April 1807
James Somerville, 14th Lord Somerville	7 August 1793	16 April 1796
James Hope-Johnstone, 3rd Earl of Hopetoun (2nd time) (Peerage)	23 October 1794	20 May 1796
George Gordon, 5th Earl of Aboyne (1st time)	30 June 1796	24 October 1806
Archibald Kennedy, 12th Earl of Cassilis	30 June 1796	24 October 1806
George Ramsay, 9th Earl of Dalhousie (1st time)	30 June 1796	24 October 1806
George Hay, 16th Earl of Erroll	30 June 1796	14 June 1798
Francis Napier, 8th Lord Napier (1st time)	30 June 1796	24 October 1806
William Carnegie, 7th Earl of Northesk (1st time)	30 June 1796	29 April 1807
John Somerville, 15th Lord Somerville	30 June 1796	29 April 1807
John Bowes, 10th Earl of Strathmore and Kinghorne (1st time)	30 June 1796	24 October 1806
George Hay, 7th Marquess of Tweeddale	30 June 1796	9 August 1804
Hugh Montgomerie, 12th Earl of Eglinton	15 August 1798	24 October 1806

=== 1800–1849 ===
Representative peer	Elected	Ceased
Alexander Lindsay, 6th Earl of Balcarres (2nd time)	10 August 1802	27 March 1825
John Elphinstone, 11th Lord Elphinstone (2nd time)	16 June 1803	29 April 1807
Thomas Erskine, 9th Earl of Kellie (1st time)	14 November 1804	24 October 1806
George Hamilton-Gordon, 4th Earl of Aberdeen	4 December 1806	10 June 1818
Robert Stuart, 11th Lord Blantyre	4 December 1806	29 April 1807
William Hay, 17th Earl of Erroll (1st time)	4 December 1806	29 April 1807
James Forbes, 17th Lord Forbes	4 December 1806	4 May 1843
Charles Kinnaird, 8th Lord Kinnaird	4 December 1806	29 April 1807
Alexander Leslie-Melville, 7th Earl of Leven	4 December 1806	29 April 1807
Eric Mackay, 7th Lord Reay (1st time)	4 December 1806	29 April 1807
Thomas Douglas, 5th Earl of Selkirk	4 December 1806	10 June 1818
George Gordon, 5th Earl of Aboyne (2nd time)	9 June 1807	10 June 1818
James Sinclair, 12th Earl of Caithness	9 June 1807	10 June 1818
George Ramsay, 9th Earl of Dalhousie (2nd time)	9 June 1807	10 June 1818
Charles Hamilton, 8th Earl of Haddington	9 June 1807	29 September 1812
Alexander Home, 10th Earl of Home	9 June 1807	23 June 1841
Thomas Erskine, 9th Earl of Kellie (2nd time)	9 June 1807	6 February 1828
Francis Napier, 8th Lord Napier (2nd time)	9 June 1807	1 August 1823
Alexander Fraser, 17th Lord Saltoun	9 June 1807	18 August 1853
Charles St Clair, 13th Lord Sinclair (1st time)	9 June 1807	23 April 1831
John Bowes, 10th Earl of Strathmore and Kinghorne (2nd time) (Peerage)	9 June 1807	29 September 1812
Francis Gray, 14th Lord Gray	13 November 1812	23 June 1841
Charles Douglas, 6th Marquess of Queensberry (Peerage)	13 November 1812	3 December 1832
George Leslie, 13th Earl of Rothes	13 November 1812	11 February 1817
William Kerr, 6th Marquess of Lothian	17 April 1817	27 April 1824
John Arbuthnott, 8th Viscount of Arbuthnott (1st time)	24 July 1818	29 February 1820
John Colville, 9th Lord Colville of Culross	24 July 1818	22 October 1849
William Hay, 17th Earl of Erroll (2nd time)	24 July 1818	26 January 1819
Archibald Primrose, 4th Earl of Rosebery	24 July 1818	24 July 1830
James Innes-Ker, 5th Duke of Roxburghe	24 July 1818	29 February 1820
George Hay, 8th Marquess of Tweeddale	24 July 1818	10 October 1876
Robert Hamilton, 8th Lord Belhaven and Stenton	18 March 1819	3 December 1832
Thomas Bruce, 7th Earl of Elgin (2nd time)	11 April 1820	14 November 1841
John Dalrymple, 6th Earl of Stair (2nd time)	11 April 1820	1 June 1821
John Arbuthnott, 8th Viscount of Arbuthnott (2nd time)	2 August 1821	23 July 1847
William Hay, 18th Earl of Erroll (Peerage)	2 October 1823	23 April 1831
William Napier, 9th Lord Napier	8 July 1824	3 December 1832
James Drummond, 6th Viscount Strathallan	2 June 1825	14 May 1851
George Douglas, 17th Earl of Morton	10 April 1828	31 March 1858
William Carnegie, 7th Earl of Northesk (2nd time)	2 September 1830	23 April 1831
Lucius Cary, 10th Viscount Falkland	3 June 1831	3 December 1832
David Leslie-Melville, 8th Earl of Leven	3 June 1831	8 October 1860
Dunbar Douglas, 6th Earl of Selkirk	3 June 1831	11 April 1885
David Ogilvy, 9th Earl of Airlie	14 January 1833	to 20 August 1849
John Elphinstone, 13th Lord Elphinstone (1st time)	14 January 1833	29 December 1834
Thomas FitzMaurice, 5th Earl of Orkney	14 January 1833	26 January 1874
Charles St Clair, 13th Lord Sinclair (2nd time)	14 January 1833	23 April 1859
Eric Mackay, 7th Lord Reay (2nd time)	10 February 1835	8 July 1847
John Rollo, 8th Lord Rollo	5 August 1841	24 December 1846
Francis Ogilvy-Grant, 6th Earl of Seafield	5 August 1841	30 July 1853
Cospatrick Douglas-Home, 11th Earl of Home (Peerage)	19 January 1842	26 January 1874
Henry Hepburne-Scott, 7th Lord Polwarth	19 July 1843	16 August 1867
John Gray, 15th Lord Gray	17 March 1847	31 January 1867
John Elphinstone, 13th Lord Elphinstone (2nd time) (Peerage)	8 September 1847	23 April 1859
William Rollo, 9th Lord Rollo	8 September 1847	1 July 1852

=== 1850–1899 ===
Representative peer	Elected	Ceased
David Ogilvy, 10th Earl of Airlie	13 March 1850	25 September 1881
Charles Stuart, 12th Lord Blantyre	13 March 1850	28 June 1892
Charles Colville, 10th Lord Colville of Culross (Peerage)	6 August 1851	18 November 1885
Thomas Lyon-Bowes, 12th Earl of Strathmore and Kinghorne	15 July 1852	6 July 1865
William Drummond, 7th Viscount Strathallan	7 September 1853	23 January 1886
John Ogilvy-Grant, 7th Earl of Seafield	16 November 1853	23 April 1859
James Sinclair, 14th Earl of Caithness	29 June 1858	11 November 1868
George Baillie-Hamilton, 10th Earl of Haddington	10 May 1859	25 June 1870
Sholto Douglas, 18th Earl of Morton	10 May 1859	24 December 1884
Alexander Fraser, 18th Lord Saltoun	10 May 1859	1 February 1886
John Rollo, 10th Lord Rollo (Peerage)	15 November 1860	11 November 1868
John Leslie-Melville, 9th Earl of Leven	28 July 1865	16 September 1876
Thomas Maitland, 11th Earl of Lauderdale	21 March 1867	1 September 1878
William Elphinstone, 15th Lord Elphinstone (Peerage)	27 November 1867	18 November 1885
James St Clair, 14th Lord Sinclair	3 December 1868	24 October 1880
Walter Erskine, 10th Earl of Mar	7 July 1869	17 January 1872
Claude Bowes-Lyon, 13th Earl of Strathmore and Kinghorne	4 August 1870	28 June 1892
John Douglas, 9th Marquess of Queensberry	7 March 1872	24 March 1880
Horace Forbes, 19th Lord Forbes	18 February 1874	8 January 1906
George Baillie-Hamilton-Arden, 11th Earl of Haddington	18 February 1874	11 June 1917
Alexander Bruce, 6th Lord Balfour of Burleigh	22 December 1876	6 July 1921
Walter Erskine, 11th Earl of Mar	22 December 1876	16 September 1888
Thomas Cochrane, 11th Earl of Dundonald	11 March 1879	15 January 1885
Cunninghame Borthwick, 19th Lord Borthwick	16 April 1880	24 December 1885
Alexander Leslie-Melville, 10th Earl of Leven	16 April 1880	22 October 1889
Walter Hepburne-Scott, 8th Lord Polwarth	11 January 1882	25 September 1900
George Carnegie, 9th Earl of Northesk	17 February 1885	9 September 1891
George FitzMaurice, 6th Earl of Orkney	17 February 1885	21 October 1889
John Lindsay, 10th Earl of Lindsay	10 June 1885	12 May 1894
David Ogilvy, 11th Earl of Airlie	10 December 1885	11 June 1900
Charles St Clair, 15th Lord Sinclair	10 December 1885	25 April 1922
Douglas Cochrane, 12th Earl of Dundonald	4 February 1886	26 October 1922
John Erskine, 27th Earl of Mar	25 March 1886	26 October 1922
Sholto Douglas, 19th Earl of Morton	25 March 1886	8 October 1935
Frederick Maitland, 13th Earl of Lauderdale	10 January 1889	25 November 1918
Alexander Fraser, 19th Lord Saltoun	6 January 1890	19 June 1933
James Drummond, 10th Viscount Strathallan	6 January 1890	5 December 1893
Ronald Leslie-Melville, 11th Earl of Leven	10 December 1891	21 August 1906
Robert Dalzell, 11th Earl of Carnwath	14 July 1892	8 March 1910
Walter Erskine, 12th Earl of Mar	14 July 1892	3 February 1950
Byron Cary, 12th Viscount Falkland	18 July 1894	10 January 1922
James Sandilands, 12th Lord Torphichen (1st time)	18 July 1894	10 January 1910

=== 1900–1963 ===
Representative peer	Elected	Ceased
Alexander Hamilton, 10th Lord Belhaven and Stenton	5 October 1900	31 October 1920
David Carnegie, 10th Earl of Northesk	5 October 1900	5 December 1921
Archibald Borthwick, 20th Lord Borthwick	30 January 1906	4 October 1910
Norman Leslie, 19th Earl of Rothes	8 November 1906	16 November 1923
John Forbes-Sempill, 18th Lord Sempill	28 January 1910	28 February 1934
John Leslie-Melville, 12th Earl of Leven	15 December 1910	11 June 1913
James Sandilands, 12th Lord Torphichen (2nd time)	15 December 1910	20 July 1915
Atholl Forbes, 21st Lord Forbes	10 October 1917	9 October 1924
Reginald Lindesay-Bethune, 12th Earl of Lindsay	10 October 1917	14 January 1939
Albert Fairfax, 12th Lord Fairfax of Cameron	19 October 1917	4 October 1939
Norman Sinclair, 18th Earl of Caithness	20 December 1918	10 May 1929
David Ogilvy, 12th Earl of Airlie	13 January 1922	31 July 1963
Robert Hamilton-Udny, 11th Lord Belhaven and Stenton	13 January 1922	15 June 1945
Archibald Leslie-Melville, 13th Earl of Leven	13 January 1922	15 January 1947
George Bruce, 7th Lord Balfour of Burleigh	16 November 1922	31 July 1963
Lucius Cary, 13th Viscount Falkland	16 November 1922	7 October 1931
George Baillie-Hamilton, 12th Earl of Haddington	16 November 1922	31 July 1963
Francis Douglas, 11th Marquess of Queensberry	16 November 1922	10 May 1929
Archibald St Clair, 16th Lord Sinclair	10 December 1923	25 November 1957
Charles Campbell, 9th Earl of Breadalbane and Holland	3 November 1924	5 May 1959
Frederick Maitland, 14th Earl of Lauderdale	31 May 1929	14 September 1931
Walter George Hepburne-Scott, 9th Lord Polwarth	31 May 1929	24 August 1944
Ian Maitland, 15th Earl of Lauderdale	29 October 1931	15 June 1945
Malcolm Leslie, 20th Earl of Rothes	29 October 1931	18 September 1959
Arthur Dalzell, 13th Earl of Carnwath	15 November 1935	9 March 1941
Alexander Fraser, 20th Lord Saltoun	15 November 1935	31 July 1963
William Forbes-Sempill, 19th Lord Sempill	15 November 1935	31 July 1963
Thomas Cochrane, 13th Earl of Dundonald	8 January 1941	6 May 1955
Eric Drummond, 7th Earl of Perth	8 January 1941	15 December 1951
John Arbuthnott, 14th Viscount of Arbuthnott	6 July 1945	6 May 1955
Thomas Fairfax, 13th Lord Fairfax of Cameron	6 July 1945	31 July 1963
Henry Hepburne-Scott, 10th Lord Polwarth	6 July 1945	31 July 1963
George Douglas-Hamilton, 10th Earl of Selkirk	6 July 1945	31 July 1963
William Lindesay-Bethune, 14th Earl of Lindsay	1 July 1947	18 September 1959
Roderick Sinclair, 19th Earl of Caithness	21 February 1950	31 July 1963
David Drummond, 8th Earl of Perth	2 April 1952	31 July 1963
Nigel Forbes, 22nd Lord Forbes	23 May 1955	31 July 1963
Aeneas Mackay, 13th Lord Reay	23 May 1955	18 September 1959
Iain Murray, 10th Duke of Atholl	1 October 1958	31 July 1963
Ian Cochrane, 14th Earl of Dundonald	6 October 1959	31 July 1963
John Erskine, 13th Earl of Mar	6 October 1959	31 July 1963
David Carnegie, 11th Earl of Northesk	6 October 1959	31 July 1963
Charles St Clair, 17th Lord Sinclair	6 October 1959	31 July 1963

== Representative peers with a qualifying title ==
=== Since the Act of Union 1707 ===
- Peerage of Great Britain

No	(Kingdom of Scotland) Representative peer	Elected	Ceased	(Kingdom of Great Britain) Title	Created	Note
1	James Douglas; 2nd Duke of Queensberry	13 February 1707	15 April 1708	Duke of Dover	26 May 1708	
2	James Hamilton; 4th Duke of Hamilton	17 June 1708	15 November 1712	Duke of Brandon	10 September 1711	
3	Alexander Gordon; 4th Duke of Gordon	1 October 1767	25 March 1784	Earl of Norwich	2 July 1784	
4	John Murray; 4th Duke of Atholl	17 October 1780	25 March 1784	Earl Strange	18 August 1786	
5	James Hamilton; 8th Earl of Abercorn	5 May 1761	14 February 1787	Viscount Hamilton	24 August 1786	
6	George Douglas; 16th Earl of Morton	8 May 1784	11 June 1790	Baron Douglas of Lochleven	11 August 1791	
7	Francis Stuart; 9th Earl of Moray	8 May 1784	20 May 1796	Baron Stuart of Castle Stuart	4 June 1796	
8	John Stewart; 7th Earl of Galloway	15 November 1774	11 June 1790	Baron Stewart of Garlies	6 June 1796	

=== Since the Act of Union 1801 ===
- Peerage of the United Kingdom

No	(Kingdom of Scotland) Representative peer	Elected	Ceased	(United Kingdom) Title	Created	Note
1	Hugh Montgomerie; 12th Earl of Eglinton	15 August 1798	24 October 1806	Baron Ardrossan	21 February 1806	
2	James Maitland; 8th Earl of Lauderdale	24 July 1790	20 May 1796	Baron Lauderdale of Thirlestane	22 February 1806	
3	John Campbell; 4th Earl of Breadalbane and Holland	8 May 1784	24 October 1806	Baron Breadalbane	13 November 1806	
3	John Campbell; 4th Earl of Breadalbane and Holland	8 May 1784	24 October 1806	Marquess of Breadalbane	12 September 1831	
4	William Cathcart; 10th Lord Cathcart	10 January 1788	29 September 1812	Viscount Cathcart	9 November 1807	
4	William Cathcart; 10th Lord Cathcart	10 January 1788	29 September 1812	Earl Cathcart	16 July 1814	
5	James Hope-Johnstone; 3rd Earl of Hopetoun	8 May 1784	11 June 1790	Baron Hopetoun	3 November 1809	
5	James Hope-Johnstone; 3rd Earl of Hopetoun	23 October 1794	20 May 1796	Baron Hopetoun	3 November 1809	
6	George Hamilton-Gordon; 4th Earl of Aberdeen	4 December 1806	10 June 1818	Viscount Gordon	16 July 1814	
7	John Bowes; 10th Earl of Strathmore and Kinghorne	30 June 1796	24 October 1806	Baron Bowes	7 August 1815	
7	John Bowes; 10th Earl of Strathmore and Kinghorne	9 June 1807	29 September 1812	Baron Bowes	7 August 1815	
8	George Ramsay; 9th Earl of Dalhousie	30 June 1796	24 October 1806	Baron Dalhousie	11 August 1815	
8	George Ramsay; 9th Earl of Dalhousie	9 June 1807	10 June 1818	Baron Dalhousie	11 August 1815	
9	George Gordon; 5th Earl of Aboyne	30 June 1796	24 October 1806	Baron Meldrum	11 August 1815	
9	George Gordon; 5th Earl of Aboyne	9 June 1807	10 June 1818	Baron Meldrum	11 August 1815	
10	George Boyle; 4th Earl of Glasgow	24 July 1790	10 June 1818	Baron Ross	11 August 1815	
11	William Kerr; 6th Marquess of Lothian	17 April 1817	27 April 1824	Baron Ker of Kersehugh	17 July 1821	
12	Archibald Primrose; 4th Earl of Rosebery	24 July 1818	24 July 1830	Baron Rosebery	26 January 1828	
13	William Hay; 18th Earl of Erroll	2 October 1823	23 April 1831	Baron Kilmarnock	17 June 1831	
14	Robert Hamilton; 8th Lord Belhaven and Stenton	18 March 1819	3 December 1832	Baron Hamilton of Wishaw	10 September 1831	
15	Lucius Cary; 10th Viscount Falkland	3 June 1831	3 December 1832	Baron Hunsdon	15 May 1832	
16	Charles Douglas; 6th Marquess of Queensberry	13 November 1812	3 December 1832	Baron Solway	7 June 1833	
17	John Ogilvy-Grant; 7th Earl of Seafield	16 November 1853	23 April 1859	Baron Strathspey	14 August 1858	
18	John Elphinstone; 13th Lord Elphinstone	14 January 1833	29 December 1834	Baron Elphinstone	21 May 1859	
18	John Elphinstone; 13th Lord Elphinstone	8 September 1847	23 April 1859	Baron Elphinstone	21 May 1859	
19	James Sinclair; 14th Earl of Caithness	29 June 1858	11 November 1868	Baron Barrogill	1 May 1866	
20	John Rollo; 10th Lord Rollo	15 November 1860	11 November 1868	Baron Dunning	29 June 1869	
21	Cospatrick Douglas-Home; 11th Earl of Home	19 January 1842	26 January 1874	Baron Douglas of Douglas	11 June 1875	
22	William Elphinstone; 15th Lord Elphinstone	27 November 1867	18 November 1885	Baron Elphinstone	30 December 1885	
23	Charles Colville; 10th Lord Colville of Culross	6 August 1851	18 November 1885	Baron Colville of Culross	31 December 1885	
23	Charles Colville; 10th Lord Colville of Culross	6 August 1851	18 November 1885	Viscount Colville of Culross	15 July 1902	
24	Claude Bowes-Lyon; 13th Earl of Strathmore and Kinghorne	4 August 1870	28 June 1892	Baron Bowes	1 July 1887	

== See also ==
- List of elections of Scottish representative peers
- List of Irish representative peers
