= John Sinclair, 23rd Lord Herdmanston =

17th-century Scottish noble

John Sinclair
- Lord Herdmanston
- Predecessor: John Sinclair
- Successor: Henry Sinclair
- Born: 14 February 1632
- Died: 13 July 1666 (aged 34)
- Noble family: Clan Sinclair
- Father: John Sinclair
- Mother: Elizabeth Sinclair

John Sinclair, Lord Herdmanston, (14 February 1632 – 13 July 1666) was a Scottish noble of the 17th century.

== Early life ==
John was baptized 14 February 1632. He was the eldest son of John Sinclair, 22nd Lord Herdmanston, and Elizabeth Sinclair. Among his brothers were William St Clair of Carfrae, Robert St Clair (Governor of Tilbury), George St Clair (a merchant, Baillie and Magistrate of Edinburgh), and Dr. Matthew St Clair.

His maternal grandfather was John Sinclair of Stevenson. His paternal grandparents were Sir John Sinclair, 21st Lord Herdmanston, and Mary Richardson (a daughter of Sir James Richardson of Smeaton). Through his brother Matthew, he was uncle to Charles St Clair of Herdmanston, later de jure Lord Sinclair (grandfather to Charles St Clair, 13th Lord Sinclair), and Dr. Andrew St Clair, physician to King George II.

== Career ==
St Clair was taken prisoner at the Battle of Worcester in 1651, and exempted from Cromwell's Act of Grace.

== Personal life ==
John married his distant cousin, Catherine Sinclair, Mistress of Sinclair, only child and heiress of John Sinclair, 10th Lord Sinclair, and Lady Mary Wemyss (eldest daughter of John Wemyss, 1st Earl of Wemyss). Among their children were:

- Henry St Clair (1660–1723), Master of Herdmanston, who succeeded as the 11th Lord Sinclair.
- John Sinclair (1663–c. 1687)
- Mary Sinclair (1666–c. 1721), who married merchant George Wilson, son of Thomas Wilson, of Edinburgh.

St Clair died on 13 July 1666 and was buried at Greyfriars Kirkyard.

=== Descendants ===
Through his son Henry, he was a grandfather of John St Clair, Master of Sinclair (1683–1750), who was attainted in 1715 and never allowed to assume title, and James St Clair (d. 1762), who never assumed the title.
