= John Sinclair, 10th Lord Sinclair =

Scottish nobleman (d. 1676)

John Sinclair
- Lord Sinclair
- Lord Sinclair coat of arms
- Predecessor: Patrick Sinclair, 9th Lord Sinclair
- Successor: Henry Sinclair, 11th Lord Sinclair
- Died: 1676
- Noble family: Clan Sinclair
- Father: Patrick Sinclair
- Mother: Margaret, daughter of John Cockburn of Ormiston

John Sinclair (died 1676) was a Scottish nobleman and the 10th Lord Sinclair. In The Scots Peerage by James Balfour Paul he is designated as the 9th Lord Sinclair in descent starting from William Sinclair, 1st Earl of Caithness and 3rd Earl of Orkney, but historian Roland Saint-Clair designates him as the 10th Lord Sinclair in descent from the father of the 1st Earl of Caithness and 3rd Earl of Orkney, Henry II Sinclair, Earl of Orkney, who is the first person recorded as Lord Sinclair in public records. Roland Saint-Clair references this to an Act of the Scottish Parliament in which the 4th Lord Sinclair was made Lord Sinclair based on his descent from his great-grandfather, Henry II Sinclair, Earl of Orkney, the first Lord Sinclair. Bernard Burke, in his a Genealogical and Heraldic Dictionary of the Peerage and Baronetage of the British Empire, agrees with the numbering by Roland Saint-Clair and says that Henry Sinclair (died 1513) and William Sinclair (died 1570) were "in reality" the fourth and fifth Lords Sinclair respectively.

== Early life ==
He was the son of Patrick Sinclair, 9th Lord Sinclair and Margaret, daughter of John Cockburn of Ormiston.

== Lord Sinclair ==
John Sinclair, 10th Lord Sinclair was an active Royalist during the Civil War. On 19 June 1633 he was a member of the Parliament held by Charles I of England at Edinburgh. On 22 March 1639 he is recorded, with other Lords, as commanding 1,000 musketeers from Dalkeith to Edinburgh. On 5 June 1644 a committee was appointed to march an army towards England by the Earl of Argyll, Earl of Lothian, Lord Kirkcudbright and Lord Sinclair. On 11 June 1644 he is on the committee for considering what may concern the army in Ireland. William Thomsone was ordered to pay Lord Sinclair 20,000 merks on 21 June 1644. A letter written by Lord Sinclair on behalf of the Royalist James Graham, 1st Marquess of Montrose from Amsterdam was read out in Parliament on 30 May 1650. He was one of the signatories to "The Northern Band and Oath of Engagement" sent by John Middleton, 1st Earl of Middleton to General Leslie in 1648.

He was taken prisoner at the Battle of Worcester in September 1651 and was imprisoned in Windsor Castle, where he remained until March 1660, when he was liberated by General Monk.

== Family ==
He married Mary, eldest daughter of John Wemyss, 1st Earl of Wemyss. She received from him a charter for the lands and barony of Ravenscraig and she was buried at the High Kirk of Glasgow.

They had one daughter, Catherine, who married John Sinclair, eldest son of John Sinclair, Lord Herdmanston. It is not known if the Sinclair Lords Herdmanston share a common origin with the Lords Sinclair who are descended from the Sinclair Barons of Roslin.

According to James Balfour Paul, John Sinclair, Lord Sinclair died on 10 November 1674, aged sixty-four, but according to Bernard Burke he died in 1676 aged sixty-six. He was succeeded by his daughter's son, Henry Sinclair, 11th Lord Sinclair, and 24th Lord Herdmanston.

== See also ==
- Baron of Roslin
- Earl of Caithness

Peerage of Scotland
Preceded by Patrick Sinclair	Lord Sinclair; 1617–1676	Succeeded by John Sinclair
