= Sinclair of Herdmanston =

Scottish peerage

Arms of Sinclair of Herdmanston, recorded in the 14th century Gelre Armorial: Argent, a cross engrailed azure.

Arms of Sinclair of Herdmanston, recorded in the 19th century: Argent, a cross engrailed sable.

A branch of the Sinclair or St Clair family took their territorial designation from their lands at Herdmanston.

== History ==
Herdmanston in East Lothian had been held from the 12th century, when Henry St Clair received a grant of the lands of Herdmanston, from Richard de Morville, Constable of Scotland. It is not known if the Sinclairs of Herdmanston share a common origin with the Sinclair Barons of Roslin, from whom branch off the Lords Sinclair and Earls of Caithness. According to the website sinclairgenealogy.info, the fact that the first proven Baron of Roslin, William St. Clair (died 1297) was made sheriff of Haddington in East Lothian where Herdmanston also is, suggests that he was appointed there to cover his own home area, and given that the name William appears frequently in the St Clair of Herdmanston family suggests that he may have been part of their extended family. However, according to the website clansinclairusa.org, William St Clair of Roslin was probably unrelated to the St Clairs of Herdmanston. According to Archibald Allan writing in 1900, Henry St Clair of Herdmanston appears to have been a son of the first William de St Clair of Roslin of the 11th century, but this William's existence cannot be proved by contemporary evidence and according to Roland Saint-Clair, William St. Clair who died in 1297 was the first proven Baron of Roslin.

The Sinclairs of Herdmanston are recorded by James Balfour Paul in his The Scots Peerage. They are also recorded by Bernard Burke in his a Genealogical and Heraldic Dictionary of the Peerage and Baronetage of the British Empire, and by 18th century herald, Alexander Nisbet, in his A System of Heraldry. The coat of arms of the Sinclair of Herdmanston family is similar to that of the Lord Sinclair, but the tincture of the cross was changed from azure to sable.

During the war known as the "Rough Wooing" many Scottish landowners made agreements with the English invaders, and were called "Assured Scots". In February 1548, the English commander William Grey, 13th Baron Grey de Wilton allowed John Sinclair to keep Herdmanston Castle. The laird of Waughton was also allowed to keep his castle. The two lairds made "sufficient pledges" to Grey of Wilton.

In April 1567, William Sinclair of Herdmanston, with his brothers John and Alexander, and Edward Sinclair of Nesbit, were involved in the abduction of Mary, Queen of Scots, to Dunbar Castle. They were given a pardon on 10 May 1567. William Sinclair of Herdmanston was described as a knight, militis, reflecting his actual position in Scottish society.

== Lords Herdmanston ==
Roland Saint-Clair writing in the late 19th century lists the following lairds of Herdmanston:

- Henry Sinclair, 1st Lord Herdmanston
- Alan de Sinclair, 2nd Lord Herdmanston (fl. c. 1244)
- John Sinclair, 3rd Lord Herdmanston (fl. c. 1248)
- John de Sinclair, 4th Lord Herdmanston (fl. c. 1296)
- William Sinclair, 5th Lord Herdmanston (fl. c. 1325)
- William Sinclair, 6th Lord Herdmanston (fl. c. 1364)
- John Sinclair, 7th Lord Herdmanston (fl. c. 1381)
- William Sinclair, 8th Lord Herdmanston (fl. c. 1407)
- John Sinclair, 11th Lord Herdmanston (fl. c. 1434)
- John Sinclair, fiar of Herdmanston (fl. c. 1472)
- William Sinclair, 12th Lord Herdmanston (fl. c. 1451)
- John Sinclair, 13th Lord Herdmanston (fl. c. 1481)
- William Sinclair, 14th Lord Herdmanston (fl. c. 1513)
- John de Sinclair, 15th Lord Herdmanston (fl. c. 1545)
- William Sinclair, 16th Lord Herdmanston (fl. c. 1586)
- John Sinclair, 17th Lord Herdmanston
- Henry Sinclair, 18th Lord Herdmanston
- William Sinclair, 19th Lord Herdmanston
- John Sinclair, 20th Lord Herdmanston
- John Sinclair, 21st Lord Herdmanston, married Mary Richardson, daughter of Sir James Richardson of Smeaton
- John Sinclair, 22nd Lord Herdmanston (d. 1686), married Elizabeth Sinclair, second daughter of John Sinclair of Stevenston
- John Sinclair, 23rd Lord Herdmanston (1632–1666), married Catherine Sinclair, daughter and heir of John Sinclair, 10th Lord Sinclair
- Henry Sinclair, 24th Lord Herdmanston and 11th Lord Sinclair
- John Sinclair, 25th Lord Herdmanston (1683–1750)
- James Sinclair, 26th Lord Herdmanston (1688–1762)
- Charles Sinclair, 27th Lord Herdmanston (c. 1691–1775), de jure 11th Lord Sinclair
- Andrew Sinclair, 28th Lord Herdmanston (1733–1776), de jure 12th Lord Sinclair
- Charles Sinclair, 29th Lord Herdmanston (1768–1863) (fl. c. 1782)
