= Carfrae Bastle =

Bastle house in Scottish Borders, Scotland

Coordinates: 55.786431°N 2.7959569°W

Carfrae Bastle is a small ruined tower house about 5 miles (8.0 km) north of Lauder, Scottish Borders, Scotland, near Hillhouse

== History ==
Carfrae Bastle is of medieval origin. The bastle has a strategic position commanding the passes from Upper Lauderdale into Lothian, by way of Glengelt and Kelphope glens. Carfrae is first mentioned in a charter in which William de Morville, son of Richard de Morville, Lord of Lauderdale, grants the lands and barony of Carfrae to Henry St Clair, in around 1196. The barony encompassed much of the eastern part of the parish of Channelkirk.

== Structure ==
The overgrown remains of rubble masonry stand to first floor height. The structure, 10.5 metres (34 ft) by 5.5 metres (18 ft), is divided into two compartments. There is a vaulted basement while the remains of a round stair-tower stand in the southeast angle.

== See also ==
- Castles in Great Britain and Ireland
- List of castles in Scotland
