= The Scots Peerage =

Compilation of the Scottish nobility (1904–1914)

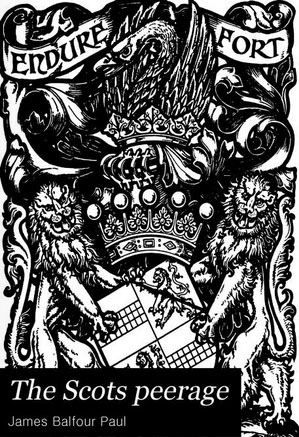
- Edited by: Sir James Balfour Paul
- Original title: The Scots Peerage: Founded on Wood's Edition of Sir Robert Douglas's Peerage of Scotland, containing an Historical and Genealogical Account of the Nobility of that Kingdom
- Illustrator: Graham Johnston
- Country: Scotland
- Language: English
- Genre: Nobility, heraldry, genealogy
- Publisher: David Douglas
- No. of books: 9 (eight volumes + index)

The Scots Peerage is a nine-volume book series of the Scottish nobility compiled and edited by Sir James Balfour Paul, published in Edinburgh from 1904 to 1914. The full title is The Scots Peerage: Founded on Wood's Edition of Sir Robert Douglas's Peerage of Scotland, containing an Historical and Genealogical Account of the Nobility of that Kingdom.

== About ==
The book series, which begins with the Kings of Scotland, is a comprehensive history of the Scottish peerage, including both extant and extinct titles. It also includes illustrations and blazons of each family's heraldic achievement: arms, crest, supporters and family mottos. Each entry is written by someone "specially acquainted with his subject, a feature of which the editor is justly proud", The Spectator noted on release of the third volume in 1906.

The full title refers to the earlier work by Sir Robert Douglas, who in 1764 published a one-volume book, The Peerage of Scotland. He was working on a second volume, but died in 1770 before it was completed. Editors finished the volume, and it was published in 1798 as Baronage of Scotland, Containing an Historical and Genealogical Account of the Gentry of that Kingdom.

A revised edition was published in 1813, edited by John Philip Wood, and received some criticism for errors committed by both Douglas and Wood.

Sir James Balfour Paul, who served as the Lord Lyon King of Arms from 1890 through 1926, wrote of the need for a new authoritative work on the subject to be published. The book is dedicated to Sir William Fraser, who left in his will funds for "printing works which would tend to elucidate the history and antiquities of Scotland".

In the preface to the first volume, Balfour Paul writes kindly of his predecessors' efforts:

The works both of Douglas and Wood were for their time admirable examples of ability and research. The former author, himself a member of an ancient Scottish house, was in a position which made it easy for him to collect information from the members of the Scottish nobility, and many of their charter-chests were opened to him. But he and his editor, Wood, laborious and painstaking though they were, lived at a period when the historical records of the country were very much less accessible than they now are. With the exception of the Acts of Parliament in an abridged and mutilated form, absolutely nothing in the way of records had in Douglas' days been printed, and references and authorities had to be patiently sought with much expenditure of time and trouble in the badly arranged, insufficiently housed, and wholly unindexed public documents. The natural consequence was that while their information, so far as it dealt with their own times or the generation immediately preceding, was on the whole commendably accurate, the particulars regarding the earlier centuries were scanty and too frequently untrustworthy.

The Oxford Dictionary of National Biography stated that The Scots Peerage was Paul's chief and most lasting contribution to Scottish heraldry:

It was fortunate that a work of this magnitude was completed on the eve of the First World War. It effectively replaced all former Scottish peerage reference works and, on the whole, was comprehensive and accurate in the information it contained. Unlike The Complete Peerage it was not limited to successors to titles of honour and their immediate heirs. Amateurs of quaint and curious footnotes are likely to be disappointed. The Scots Peerage, as Paul acknowledged, was not his work alone—he received much assistance from a well-chosen body of able and learned persons—but there can be no doubt that he inspired the work and deserves most of the credit for it.

== Volumes ==
The Scots Peerage is out of copyright. Its volumes are available at the Internet Archive:

| Volume | Date | From | To | Pages |
|---|---|---|---|---|
| Volume I at the Internet Archive | 1904 | Kings of Scotland; Earl of Abercorn | Lord Balmerino | 575 |
| Volume II at the Internet Archive | 1905 | Lord Banff | Lord Cranstoun | 602 |
| Volume III at the Internet Archive | 1906 | Earl of Crawford | Viscount Falkland | 617 |
| Volume IV at the Internet Archive | 1907 | Earl of Fife | Earl of Hyndford | 597 |
| Volume V at the Internet Archive | 1908 | Lord Innermeath | Earl of Mar | 639 |
| Volume VI at the Internet Archive | 1909 | Earl of Marchmont | Viscount of Oxfuird | 601 |
| Volume VII at the Internet Archive | 1910 | Earl of Panmure | Lord Sinclair | 502 |
| Volume VIII at the Internet Archive | 1911 | Lord Somerville | Earl of Winton | 605 |
| Volume IX at the Internet Archive | 1914 | Index and corrections | | 913 |

== Coats of arms gallery ==
The bookplates of coats of arms for each title were made by Graham Johnston, who was herald-painter at the Court of the Lord Lyon from 1898 to 1927. The illustrations in the first two volumes were of a bold, minimalistic style, which changed in the third volume to a more traditional style.

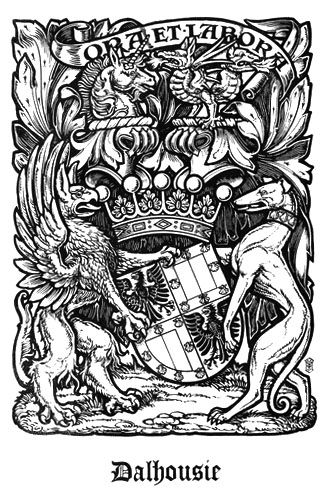
Arms of the Earl of Dalhousie

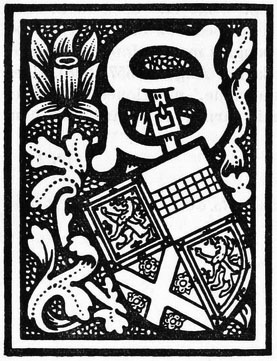
Arms of Lord Doune

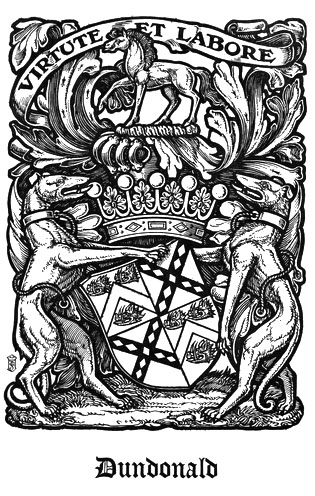
Arms of the Earl of Dundonald

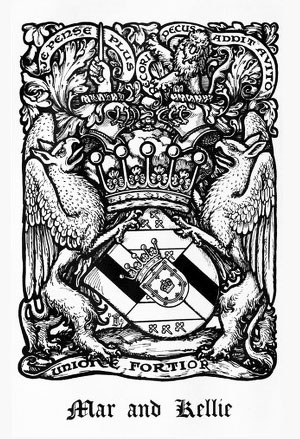
Arms of the Earl of Mar and Kellie

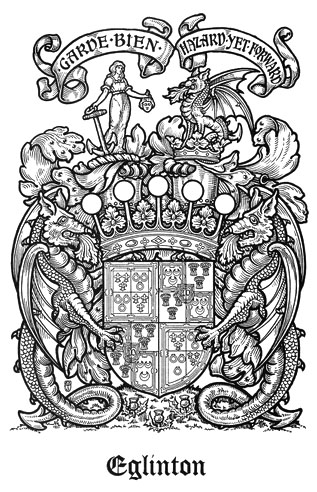
Arms of the Earl of Eglinton and Winton

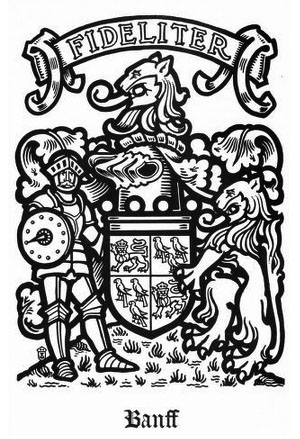
Arms of Lord Banff

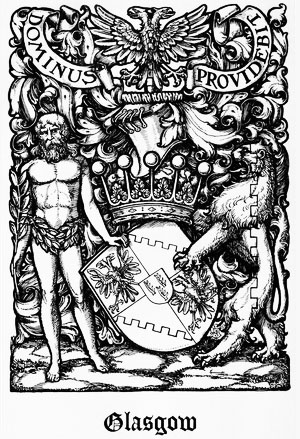
Arms of the Earl of Glasgow

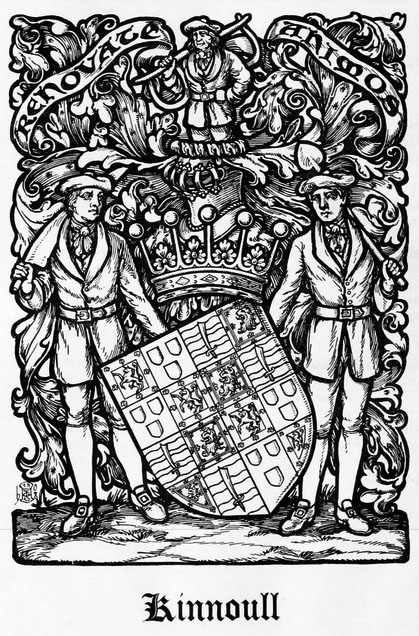
Arms of the Earl of Kinnoull

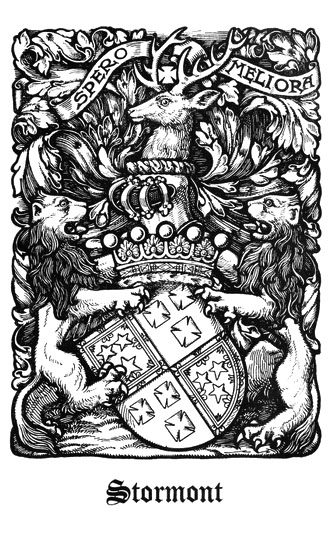
Arms of Viscount Stormont

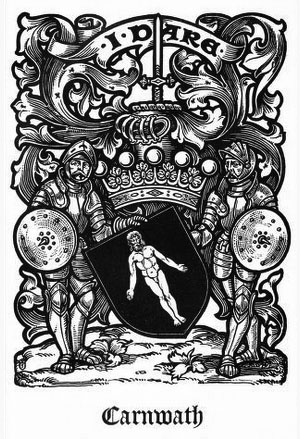
Arms of the Earl of Carnwath

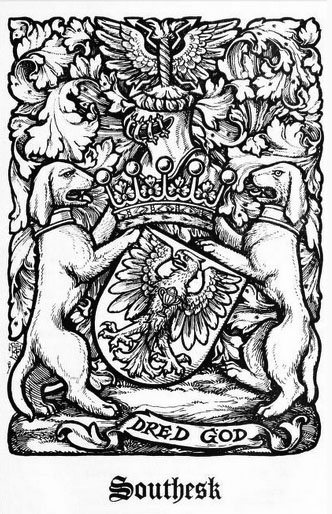
Arms of the Earl of Southesk

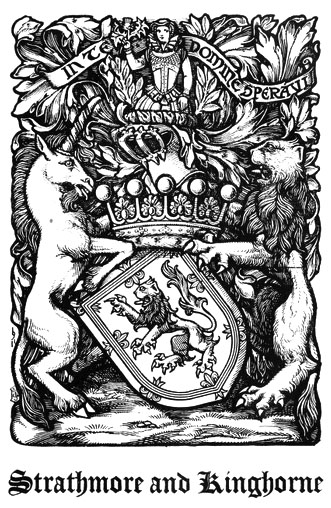
Arms of the Earl of Strathmore and Kinghorne

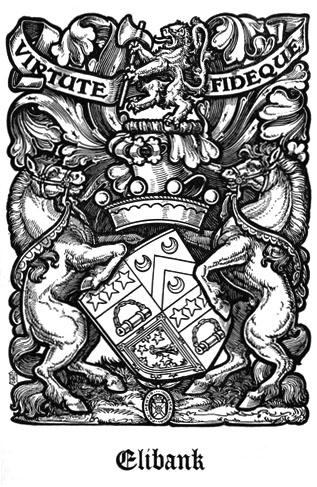
Arms of Lord Elibank

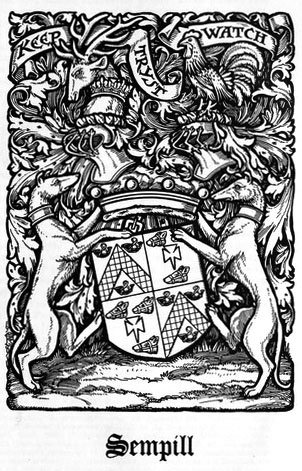
Arms of Lord Sempill

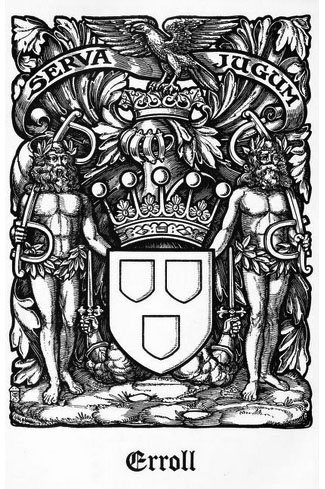
Arms of the Earl of Erroll
