= John Sutherland, 7th Earl of Sutherland =

- Earl of Sutherland Coat of Arms
- Born: Unknown
- Died: 1460; Dunrobin Castle, Sutherland, Scotland
- Relatives: Robert Sutherland, 6th Earl of Sutherland (father); Margaret Lamington (wife); John Sutherland, 8th Earl of Sutherland (son)
- Military career
- Allegiance: Scotland

John Sutherland, (died 1460) was the 7th Earl of Sutherland and chief of the Clan Sutherland, a Scottish clan of the Scottish Highlands.

== Early life ==
He was the son of Robert Sutherland, 6th Earl of Sutherland and Margaret Stewart, daughter of Alexander Stewart, Earl of Buchan (the Wolf of Badenoch).

== Earl of Sutherland ==
According to 19th-century historian William Fraser, the first mention of John, 7th Earl of Sutherland was in 1408 by Andrew of Wyntoun in his Orygynale Cronykil of Scotland. Before the commencement of the Battle of Baugé in 1421 in France where the Scots defeated the English, the Duke of Burgundy knighted several of the squires and the first of these was John of Sutherland.

The next record of John, 7th Earl of Sutherland is in 1444 when he was at Pontefract Castle as a hostage for the ransom of James I of Scotland. The earl or his father had gone to England in 1427 as substitutes for the eldest son of the Earl of March and the hostages were apparently allowed to receive friends as well as carry out their business. John of Sutherland is found granting to his kinsman, Alexander Sutherland, 3rd of Duffus, a charter for the lands of Torboll in terms of resignation by Alexander's father and grandfather. The grant was witnessed by several Scottish gentlemen including Michael Scott of Balwearie, Alexander Erskine of Dun, Alexander Straton of Lauriston, and Sir William Baillie of Hoprig, who was either brother-in-law or father-in-law to the earl himself.

The earl is found back at his own seat of Dunrobin Castle in Sutherland in May 1448 where he issued a presentation in favour of Alexander Rattar to be chaplain of St Andrews chaplainry at Golspie. In 1451, the earl received to himself and his wife, Margaret, a crown charter for Crakaig, Easter Loth, Overglen of Loth, Wester Loth, and other lands in the parish of Loth. The earl also resigned the earldom into the hands of James II of Scotland in 1456, for a re-grant to his second son, John, and his heirs, but reserving the aforementioned lands to himself and his countess.

According to 17th-century historian, Sir Robert Gordon, 1st Baronet, it was during the time of John, 7th Earl of Sutherland that John of Islay, Earl of Ross invaded Sutherland with five or six hundred followers and penetrated as far as Skibo Castle, but that the invaders were subsequently defeated at the Battle of Skibo and Strathfleet. According to Gordon, in the initial engagement the MacDonalds under John of Islay were attacked and routed at Skibo by the forces of Neil Murray of Aberscross, the principal vassal and sept of the Clan Sutherland, who had been sent by the Earl of Sutherland. At the second engagement at Strathfleet where the MacDonalds were also defeated, the Clan Sutherland had been led by Robert Sutherland, brother of the Earl of Sutherland.

According to historian D. M Rose, the 7th and 8th Earls of Sutherland did little to advance their family's reputation, leaving their kinsman the Murays of Culbin, Pulrossie and Aberscross to fight their battles.

According to Gordon, John, 7th Earl died at Dunrobin in 1460 and was buried at the chapel of St Andrews in Golspie, rather than the usual burial place of the earls at Dornoch Cathedral.

== Family ==
John Sutherland, 7th Earl of Sutherland married Margaret, daughter or sister of Sir William Ballie of Lamington who was one of the earl's fellow hostages. They had the following children:

1. Alexander, Master of Sutherland, who appears on a charter of Alexander of Islay, Earl of Ross at Inverness dated 10 October 1444, but who died before his father in 1456. According to Gordon he left a daughter, Marjorie, who married William Sinclair, 1st Earl of Caithness. However, according to Fraser, Lord Hailes proves that Marjorie, Countess of Caithness, was the daughter of Alexander Sutherland of Dunbeath, but that he could not have been aware of the aforementioned charter, concluding that Alexander must have died previous to 1456 when his next brother John was treated as the heir to the title of the earldom of Sutherland.
2. John Sutherland, 8th Earl of Sutherland, heir and successor.
3. Nicolas Sutherland, who witnessed his father's letter of presentation in 1448, but of whom nothing further is known.
4. Thomas Beg Sutherland, according to Gordon, he was the ancestor of the Sutherlands in Strath Ullie, but according to Fraser nothing further of him is known.
5. Lady Jean Sutherland, who married Sir James Dunbar, and left issue.
6. Lady Murial Sutherland, who married Alexander Seton of Meldrum. However, according to Fraser, while there is evidence that Alexander Seton married a Murial Sutherland, her connection with the Earl of Sutherland has not been confirmed and the Seton pedigree says that she was from the Sutherland of Duffus family.
7. Thomas More Sutherland, a natural son, who in turn had two sons of his own who were killed by their uncle, John Sutherland, 8th Earl of Sutherland.

Peerage of Scotland
Preceded by Robert Sutherland	Earl of Sutherland c. 1427 – 1460	Succeeded by John Sutherland
