= Alexander Murray (knight) =

13th-century Scottish noble

- Lord of Culbin, Newton and Skelbo
- Noble family: Murray family
- Spouse: Eva
- Issue: John; Murdoch

Sir Alexander Murray, Lord of Culbin and Newton, was a Scottish noble. He was the eldest son of Richard de Moravia (Richard Murray of Culbin) and Margery de Lascelles.

He is known to have married Eva, whose parentage is currently unknown. Eva remarried after Alexander's death to Alexander Comyn of Dunphail.

It is recorded that Alexander had two sons: John, and Murdoch.

== Castle and lands ==
As heir to his father Richard, he inherited Skelbo Castle, (Note: Skelbo had been granted to Richard by his brother Gilbert de Moravia in 1235.) Culbin and Newton. Further lands were inherited from his mother Marjorie and maternal uncle Duncan Lascelles. Alexander held Wester Beath in Fife.
