= William de Moravia =

William de Moravia may refer to:

- William de Moravia of Petty (died c. 1226), Scottish noble
- William de Moravia, 1st Earl of Sutherland (c. 1210–1248), Scottish nobleman
- William de Moravia, 2nd Earl of Sutherland (c. 1235–1307), Scottish nobleman
- William de Moravia, 3rd Earl of Sutherland (fl. early 14th century), chief of the Clan Sutherland
- William de Moravia, 5th Earl of Sutherland (died 1370), chief of the Clan Sutherland
