= Colin Sinclair =

Colin Sinclair may refer to:

- Colin Sinclair (footballer) (born 1947), Scottish former footballer
- Colin Sinclair (boxer) (1890–1970), Australian boxer
- Colin Sinclair (politician) (1876–1956), Australian politician
- Colin Sinclair (tennis) (born 1994), Northern Mariana Islands tennis player
- Colin Sinclair (minister), Church of Scotland minister and Moderator of the General Assembly of the Church of Scotland (2019-2020)
- Col Sinclair (1896–1959), Australian rules footballer
