= Murray of Aberscross =

Minor branch of noble Scottish family

- Cadet branch
- Parent family: Murray of Pulrossie
- Country: Scotland
- Current region: Highlands
- Final head: Alexander Murray (d.1631)
- Connected families: Earl of Sutherland
- Estate: Aberscross

The Murrays (or Morays) of Aberscross (or Aberscors) were a minor noble Scottish family who were seated at Aberscross Castle, in the county of Sutherland, Scotland. The Murrays in Sutherland are recorded specifically as a clan in two acts of the Scottish Parliament of the 16th century.

== History ==
=== Origins of the clan ===
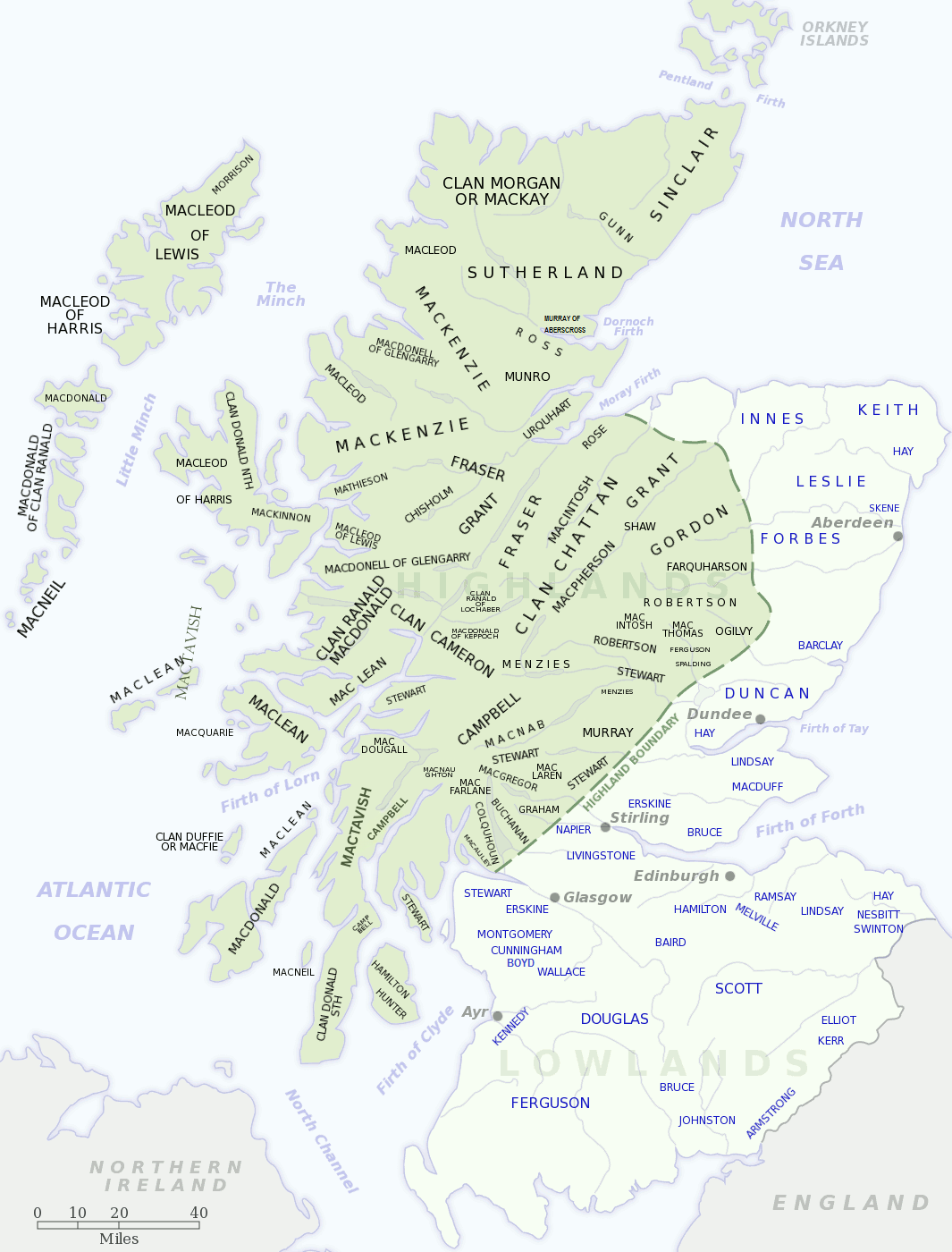
Murray of Aberscross shown to the north on the clan map of Scotland

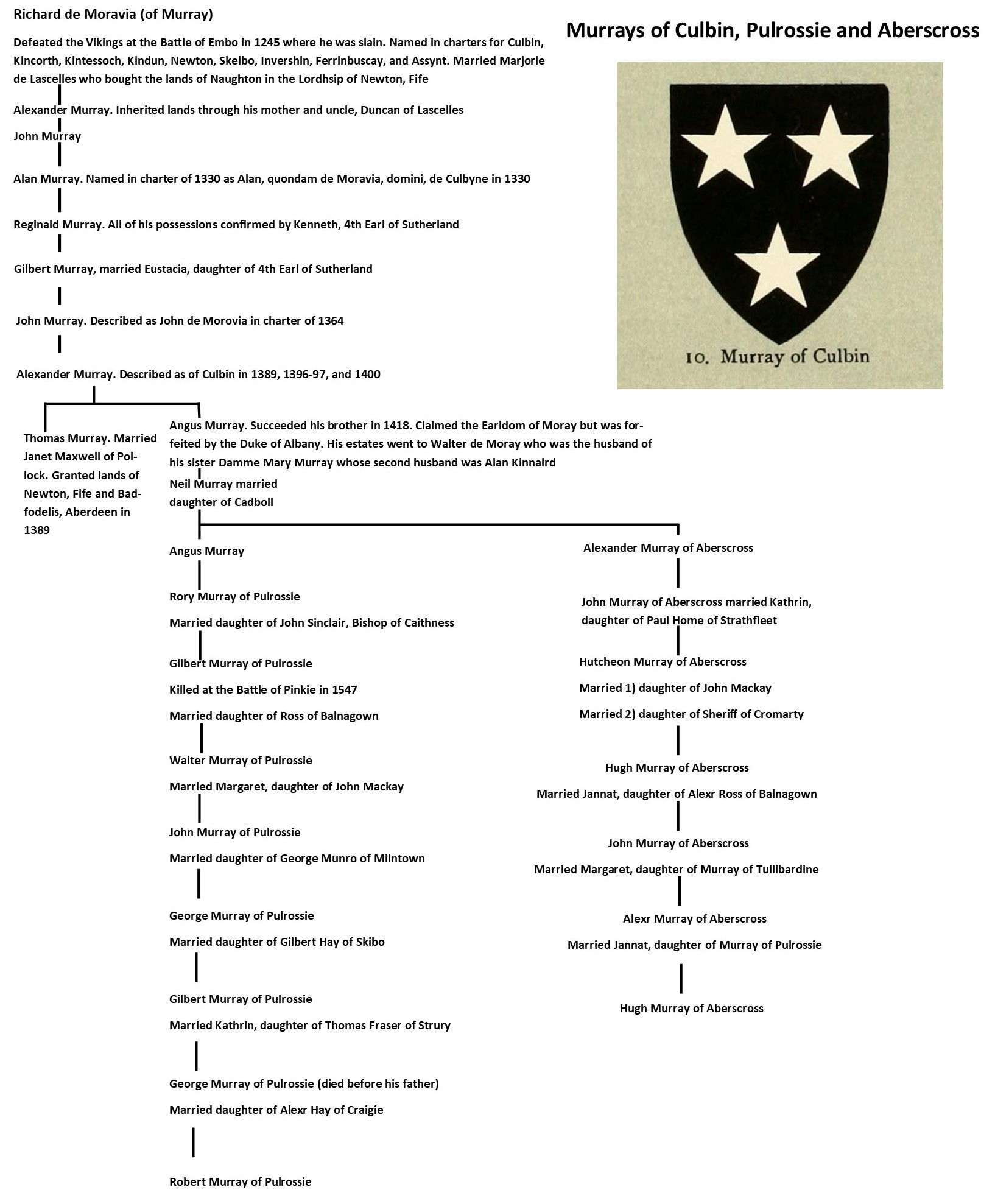
Connection of the Murray of Culbin, Pulrossie and Aberscross families. The Culbin lineage is sourced from Sinclair Ross's The Culbin Sands - Fact and Fiction. The Pulrossie and Aberscross descent is in accordance with Sir Robert Gordon's Genealogical Tables, folios 23 and 24, which also show many siblings for each generation. The Murray of Culbin coat of arms is taken from George Harvey Johnston's The Heraldry of the Murrays (1910) which in turn is sourced from Sir Robert Forman's MS of the Lyon Office dated c. 1566

Despite their name, this Murray family were not part of the Clan Murray in Tullibardine and Atholl but were in fact a sept of the Clan Sutherland, whose chiefs were the Earls of Sutherland. The Earls of Sutherland were originally a family named "de Moravia", meaning "of Moray" or "of Murray" and shared a common ancestor with the chiefs of the Clan Murray in Tullibardine and Atholl. According to historian George Harvey Johnston, all of the different families of Moray or Murray were descended from the Morays of Bothwell (ancestors of the Murrays of Tullibardine and Atholl), but the connecting lines are now lost and the origin of each family is a matter of conjecture or dispute. The same historian also states that the Earls of Sutherland and all of their cadets were descended from Moray of Bothwell. The Murrays of Aberscross or Aberscors seem to have arrived in Sutherland in 1198. Hugo or Hugh de Moravia, second son of Freskin, was appointed as the first Lord of Sutherland and his son, William, was the first Earl of Sutherland (d. 1248). In Hugo or Hugh's entourage were his cousins, or nephews, Richard de Moravia and Gilbert de Moravia who are said to have been the ancestors of the Murrays of Aberscross. Richard was a soldier who was famous for successfully defending the coast of Sutherland from the Vikings at the Battle of Embo in 1245, and Gilbert became Bishop of Caithness and Sutherland.

Gilbert granted to his brother Richard the lands of Skelbo, and they remained with Richard's descendants for two centuries. Richard's successors were men of distinguished valour and in high repute among their contemporaries for their war-like virtues. They held extensive possessions in the county of Sutherland and were allied with the powerful family of Sutherland. According to 17th-century historian Sir Robert Gordon, 1st Baronet, the ancestry of the Murrays of Aberscross can be traced back to Alexander Murray of Culbin (c. 1407), who in turn was descended from Richard de Moravia.

=== Feuds with the Mackays ===
As septs of the Clan Sutherland, the Murrays of Aberscross were the principal vassals of the Earls of Sutherland and were charged with the defense of the shire. In 1431, the Murrays led the Clan Sutherland against the Clan Mackay at Battle of Drumnacoub where Angus Murray of Pulrossie was killed. Angus Murray's son, Neil Murray, led the Clan Sutherland at the Battle of Skibo and Strathfleet in 1455 against the Clan Donald. According to historian D. M Rose, the 7th and 8th Earls of Sutherland did little to advance their family's reputation, leaving their kinsman the Murays of Culbin, Pulrossie and Aberscross to fight their battles. The Murray families of Culbin and Pulrossie were also descended from Richard de Moravia.

In 1494, the Murrays were in dispute with the Kinnaird family over the ownership of Skelbo Castle which eventually went to the Kinnairds, who were also descended from Richard de Moravia.

=== Vassals of the Gordon Earls of Sutherland ===
In the early 16th century a younger son of the Earl of Huntly, chief of Clan Gordon, married an heiress of the last de Moravia Earl of Sutherland. Murray of Aberscross may have been for a time partisan to Alexander Sutherland who rivaled the Gordon's claim to the Earldom of Sutherland. However, the Murrays of Aberscross then supported the new Gordon Earls of Sutherland at a number of battles including the Battle of Torran Dubh in 1517 against Mackay of Strathnaver, and the Battle of Alltachuilain in 1518 or 1519 against Alexander Sutherland himself. Murray of Aberscross was victorious on both occasions, and was then offered women in marriage for his loyalty by the new Gordon Earls of Sutherland but he declined the offer. Historian Robert Mackay states that: "The year 1518 Adam (Gordon) Earl of Sutherland gave unto John Murray of Aberscors (Shiberscross), for his two sons Hugh and Thomas, the ward and marriage of Janet Clyne, and of her sister Elizabeth, the daughters and heirs of William Clyne of Clyne: all which and more did John Murray and his children deserve at Earl Adam his hands for their good service in defence of his earldom and country". According to Charles Gordon, 11th Marquess of Huntly (d. 1937), Earl Adam Gordon of Sutherland fled from the field of Flodden where his brother, the gallant Laird of Gight was killed, and that when his brother-in-law Alexander Sutherland tried to assert his right to the Earldom of Sutherland by force of arms, he remained quietly at home and got Leslie of Kinninvie and the old warrior Laird, Murray of Aberscross, to fight his battles and recover his wife's possessions.

Retaliation and vengeance against the Sutherlands was mainly suffered by the Murrays whose lands in Rogart and Dornoch were often laid waste, and after the Gordon Earl of Sutherland had been forfeited in 1563, the Murrays in Sutherland became involved in feuds and quarrels, mostly against the Clan Mackay, but also against the Sutherland Laird of Duffus and the Earl of Caithness. In 1542, Hutcheon Murray of Aberscross led the Clan Sutherland at the Battle of Alltan-Beath against the Clan Mackay where the Mackays were defeated.

=== Feuds with the Earl of Caithness ===
In 1570, a feud arose between Alexander Gordon, 12th Earl of Sutherland and George Sinclair, 4th Earl of Caithness, chief of the Clan Sinclair. Caithness was supported by his father-in-law Alexander Sutherland, 8th of Duffus, (a descendant of the old de Moravia Earls of Sutherland). Caithness made Duffus's brother, William Sutherland of Evelick, attack the Murrays of Aberscoss in vengeance, taking prisoner John Croy-Murray. Hugh Murray of Aberscross then assembled his friends and made incursions upon the lands of Evelick as well as laying waste to several villages belonging to the Laird of Duffus and taking hostage a Sutherland gentlemen to secure the safety of John Croy-Murray. The Sutherland Laird of Duffus then gathered all of his kinsmen at Skibo Castle and proceeded to the town of Dornoch with the intention of burning it. However, the Murrays went out and met them in battle, overthrowing them and pursuing them back to the gates of Skibo. Prisoners were then exchanged for John Croy-Murray. This was known as the Battle of Torran-Roy.

On hearing of the news of the Battle of Torran-Roy, the Earl of Caithness sent the Master of Caithness who, along with the Mackays, besieged the Murrays in Dornoch Castle and the church. The Murrays held out for a week before surrendering after which several of them were beheaded. George Sinclair, 4th Earl of Caithness later imprisoned his son, the Master of Caithnes, for making peace with the Murrays.

Hugh Murray of Aberscross married a daughter of John Mackay, 11th of Strathnaver, chief of the Clan Mackay, and had a son by her also called Hugh who is recorded in a charter from William Sutherland, 9th of Duffus, dated 21 February 1581, as "son and heir of Hugh Moray of Aberscross and grandson, and one of the heirs of, John Mackay of Strathnaver". In 1586, Hugh Murray of Aberscross held command in the coalition that defeated the Clan Gunn at the Battle of Leckmelm.

A list from 1587 of clans who had a captain, chief or chieftains on which they depended but at times against the will of their land-lords includes the "Murrayis, in Suthirland". A list of clans in two acts of Parliament in 1587 and 1594 includes the "Murrays, or Sutherlands".

In 1590, John Murray of Aberscross was killed leading the Clan Sutherland against the Earl of Caithness at the Battle of Clynetradwell.

=== Loss of the Aberscross estate ===
In the early 17th century there was little friendliness between the Murrays of Aberscross and the Gordon House of Sutherland ever since the Murrays had refused to fight at the Battle of Clynetradwell in 1590 unless they were allowed on the right wing of the army which they were accustomed to. Consequently, they had, as a rule, increasingly looked to the chiefs of the Murray House of Tullibardine for countenance. Hugh Murray the fiar of Aberscross and doyen of the clan died in 1610 at a great age.

In 1623, John Murray of Aberscross commanded the right wing of Sir Robert Gordon, 1st Baronet's army that marched into Caithness and took the surrender of George Sinclair, 5th Earl of Caithness who had been declared a rebel.

Sir Robert Gordon, 1st Baronet, who himself was a younger son of Alexander Gordon, 12th Earl of Sutherland, wrote his manuscript history of the Earldom of Sutherland up to the year 1630 with a continuation up to 1651 that was written by Gilbert Gordon of Sallach and the full manuscript being published in 1813. According to the continuation, in 1631, Alexander Murray ("Morray") of Aberscross ("Abiscors") died after a fall from a stair. He left one son and two daughters. Half of the estate went direct to the Earl of Sutherland while the other half also went to the Earl of Sutherland because of the death of the last Laird of Duffus who was superior of that part of the estate under the Earl. According to the continuation, John Gordon, 14th Earl of Sutherland dealt nobly with Alexander Murray, his wife and his children in respect of the ancient and faithful service that the family had given to the Sutherlands. He gave part of the estate to the old widow (mother of Alexander and wife of John Murray of Aberscross), part to the widow of Alexander, and part to the children of Alexander to maintain, while another part was reserved to the Earl as acknowledgment of his superiority. According to Gordon, the estate of Aberscross ("Abiscors") became so overburdened with debt that it would never again be redeemed by the true and lawful heirs.

=== Jacobite risings ===
During the Jacobite rising of 1715 the tacksman of Aberscross led twenty men in support of the Earl of Sutherland at the Skirmish of Alness against the Jacobites.

== Aberscross castle ==
Today nothing remains of the family's castle at Aberscross which fell into ruin in the 17th century. Aberscross Castle was held by the de Moravia (Murray) family from when they first moved to Sutherland at the end of the twelfth century.

== Lairds (incomplete) ==
- Angus Murray of Pulrossie (d. 1431)
- Neil Murray of Aberscross (c. 1480)
- John Murray of Aberscross (Shiberscross) (c. 1518)
- Hutcheon Murray of Aberscross (c. 1542)
- Hugh Murray of Aberscross (c. 1554)
- Hugh Murray of Aberscross (Shiberscross) (c. 1570)
- Hugh Murray of Aberscors (Shiberscross) (c. 1581)
- John Murray of Aberscross (d. 1590)
- Alexander Murray of Aberscors (d. 1631)
