= William de Moravia, 2nd Earl of Sutherland =

Scottish noble

- de Moravia Earl of Sutherland Coat of Arms
- Born: c.1235
- Died: 1307; Sutherland, Scotland
- Relatives: William de Moravia, 1st Earl of Sutherland (father); William de Moravia, 3rd Earl of Sutherland (son)
- Military career
- Allegiance: Scotland
- Conflicts: Scottish–Norwegian War

William de Moravia, (William Sutherland) (c. 1235–1307) was a Scottish nobleman, 2nd Earl of Sutherland and chief of the Clan Sutherland, a Scottish clan of the Scottish Highlands.

== Ancestry ==
William de Moravia, 2nd Earl of Sutherland was the only known son of William de Moravia, 1st Earl of Sutherland who had died in 1248.

== Earl of Sutherland ==
The first historical records mentioning William de Moravia, 2nd Earl of Sutherland are in the Exchequer Rolls of Scotland in 1263 and 1266 when the Sheriff of Inverness whose jurisdiction included Sutherland and Caithness was paid a yearly due of £20 to the king from the Earl of Sutherland. Similar fines were paid by the Bishop of Ross and the Earl of Caithness, but what they were for is not clear. They may have been in connection with the Norwegian invasion of 1263.

At the beginning of 1269, William, Earl of Sutherland was at Nairn where he witnessed a charter from William II, Earl of Ross to the church of Moray for a grant of land by his brother-in-law, the late Freskin of Moray, Lord of Duffus. Another of the witnesses was Archibald Herrock (or Heroch) the Bishop of Caithness who was also asked to help in ending a controversial feud between the Earl of Sutherland and the church which had started during the time of William, 1st Earl of Sutherland and Bishop Gilbert de Moravia. The dispute was over lands that included Skibo Castle. In the end, an agreement was made and sealed at Dornoch Cathedral in which it was decided that the lands belonged to the church and William, 2nd Earl of Sutherland was compensated with the lands of Owenes. Around the same time William, 2nd Earl of Sutherland witnessed a charter to the monks of Beauly Priory.

In 1284, William, 2nd Earl of Sutherland was present when Alexander III of Scotland called a parliament at Scone to address the issue of him being left without an heir after the death of his son and daughter, with the exception of his infant granddaughter who was known as the Maid of Norway. After the death of King Alexander, it is not recorded which side the Earl of Sutherland took, but it is recorded that he was with the other nobles and magnates of Scotland who addressed Edward I of England on 17 March 1290 at Birgham. This was to consent the marriage between the Prince of Wales and the infant Queen of Scotland. In 1291, Edward I of England visited various towns in Scotland and he directed Inverness Castle to take the oath of the Earl of Sutherland. The earl was directed to give his oath to the constable, Sir William Braytoft, and they were to jointly receive the homage of the sheriff, bailies and others of the county. According to historian William Fraser, it is not clear if this was done but probably was. The Earl of Sutherland did not join the revolt of the northern earls in 1296 against the English King and appears to have remained constant with the English party, as Robert the Bruce also was at the time. On 28 August 1296, the Earl of Sutherland gave his oath of fealty to the English King at Berwick-upon-Tweed. It is recorded that the Earl of Sutherland was still an adherent of the English King in 1304 and 1306.

17th-century historian of the House of Sutherland, Sir Robert Gordon, 1st Baronet (1580–1656), who himself was a younger son of Alexander Gordon, 12th Earl of Sutherland, stated that William, 2nd Earl of Sutherland was with Robert the Bruce at his brilliant victory over the English at the Battle of Bannockburn in 1314 and that he died in 1325. However, 19th-century historian William Fraser says that this is disproved with contemporary documents that had recently been discovered. Fraser states that a letter or petition from William, Earl of Ross to Edward II of England, which although undated, from its contents must have been written in the spring or early part of 1308, stated that William, Earl of Sutherland had died. Fraser goes on to say that other letters confirm that William, Earl of Sutherland died some time between April 1306 and September 1307, and may have even preceded the death of Edward I of England who died in July 1307. Modern historians of the Cambridge University Press also state that William, 2nd Earl of Sutherland died some time between April 1306 and September 1307.

== Family ==
William de Moravia, 2nd Earl of Sutherland had two sons:

1. William de Moravia, 3rd Earl of Sutherland (heir and successor).
2. Kenneth de Moravia, 4th Earl of Sutherland (who succeeded his brother).

Peerage of Scotland
Preceded by William de Moravia	Earl of Sutherland; 1248-1307	Succeeded by William de Moravia
