= Richard de Moravia =

13th-century Scottish noble

- Lord of Culbin and Skelbo
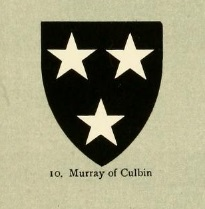
- Coat of Arms of the Murray of Culbin family recorded as Sable, three stars argent.
- Died: c.1245
- Buried: Dornoch Cathedral, Dornoch, Sutherland
- Residence: Skelbo Castle, Dornoch, Sutherland
- Noble family: Murray family
- Spouse: Marjorie de Lascelles
- Issue: Alexander; William; Malcolm; Patrick.

Richard de Moravia or Richard de Moray of Culbin or of Cubyn, was a Scottish nobleman famed for his victory over the Vikings at the Battle of Embo which took place in Sutherland, Scotland in 1245.

== Origins ==
Richard was a son of Murdac (Muiredach), son of Alexander de Moravia. This is proven in a charter from Abbot of Dunfermline, which identifies Richard as "Ric de Moravia fil Murdaci filii Alexandri de Moravia".

He was also either the cousin, or nephew, of Hugh or Hugo de Moravia, also known as Hugh Freskin, who was the first Lord of Sutherland and whose son was William de Moravia, 1st Earl of Sutherland (d.1284). Richard's brother was Gilbert de Moravia (d.1245) who was Bishop of Caithness. Gilbert is also known to have had an older brother John, and a younger brother, Simon.

== Castle and lands ==
Richard de Moravia received from his elder brother, Gilbert, all of the lands that Gilbert had received from Hugo Freskyn, (also recorded as Hugo de Moravia) and the charter was confirmed by Alexander II of Scotland. Richard was also given Skelbo Castle by his brother Gilbert in 1235. He also held lands at Kincorth, Kintessoch, Kildun, Ethder, Calder, Newton, Invershin, Ferrinbuscay and Assynt. His wife Marjorie, brought lands at Naughton as part of her dowry.

== Battle of Embo ==
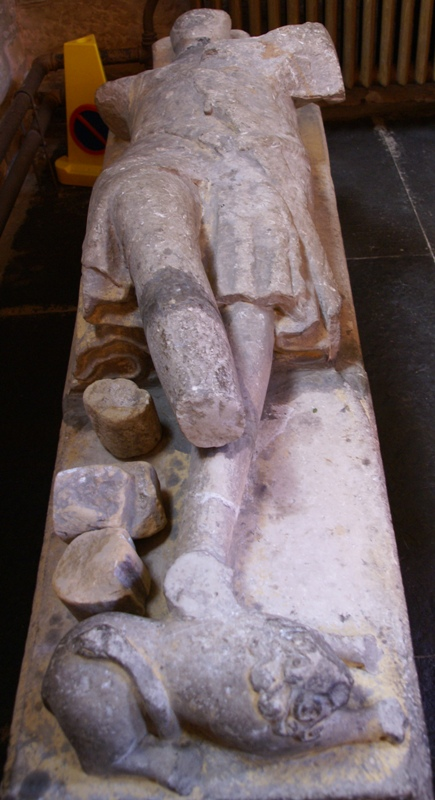
The sarcophagus effigy of Richard de Moravia in Dornoch Cathedral

William, Earl of Sutherland asked Richard de Moravia to engage a party of Danes (Vikings) who had landed at Littleferry, Sutherland until the Earl could come to his aid with a stronger force. The plan worked and the Danes were routed by the arrival of the Earl. However, Richard was killed during the battle. The Earl then arranged for Richard's body to be interred in Dornoch Cathedral and his damaged sarcophagus can still be seen there today. This was known as the Battle of Embo and took place in 1245.

== Family and descendants ==
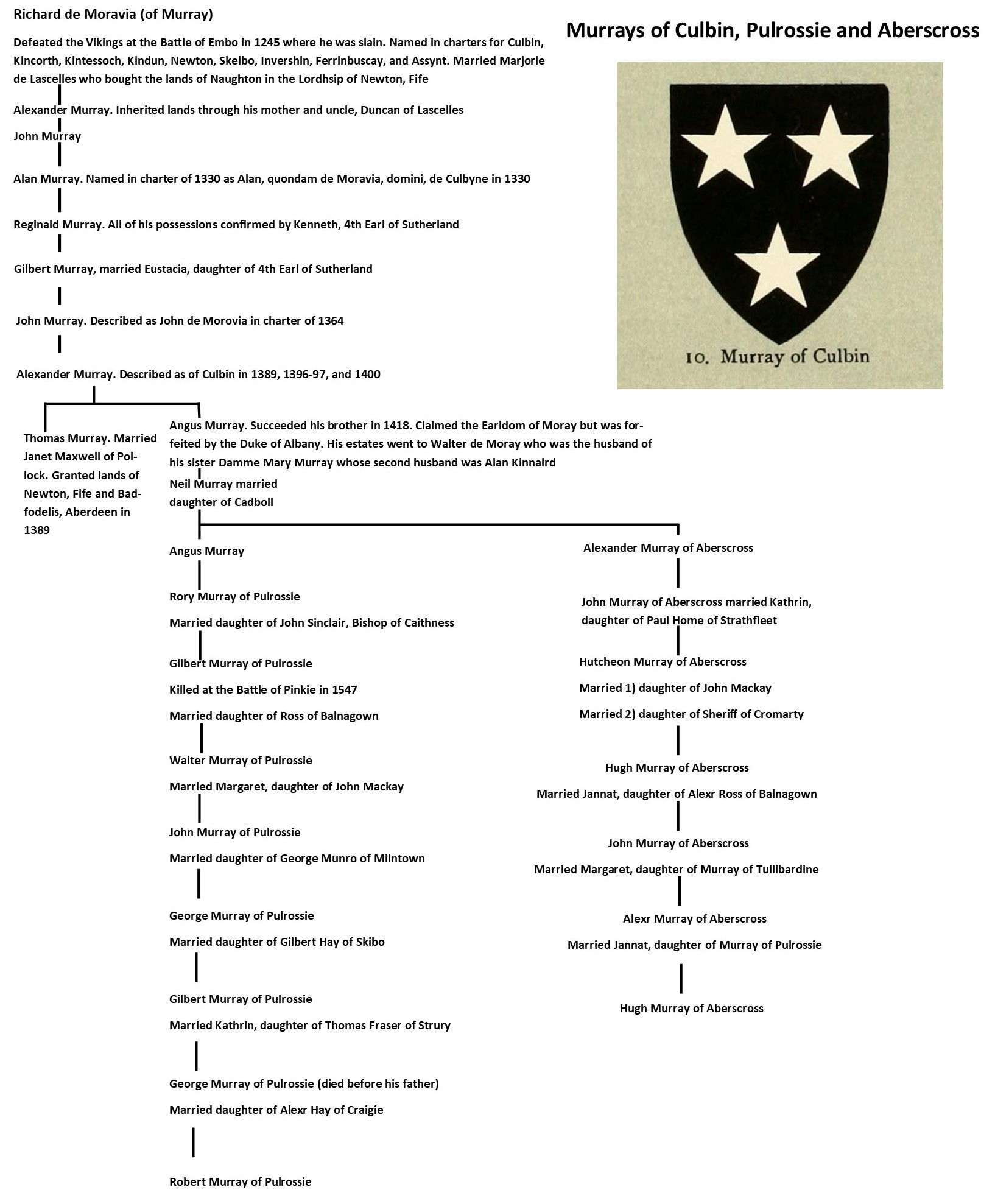
Connection of the Murray of Culbin, Pulrossie and Aberscross families. The Culbin lineage is sourced from Sinclair Ross's The Culbin Sands - Fact and Fiction. The Pulrossie and Aberscross descent is in accordance with Sir Robert Gordon's Genealogical Tables, folios 23 and 24, which also show many siblings for each generation. The Murray of Culbin coat of arms is taken from George Harvey Johnston's The Heraldry of the Murrays (1910) which in turn is sourced from Sir Robert Forman's MS of the Lyon Office dated c. 1566

Richard de Moravia married Marjorie Lascelles, widow of Peter Hay, she was the daughter and heiress of Alan de Lascelles. They had four sons: Sir Alexander, William, Sir Malcolm, and Sir Patrick.

Their great-grandson Alan; whose son was Reginald; whose son was Gilbert. Gilbert married Eustachia, daughter of Kenneth de Moravia, 4th Earl of Sutherland. Their son was Walter whose daughter and heiress was Egidia de Moravia who carried the estates of Cubyn (Culbin) and Skelbol (Skelbo) into the Kinnaird family.

Richard de Moravia is also believed to have been the ancestor of the Murray of Aberscross family in Sutherland. The surname de Moravia meaning "of Moray" or "of Murray".

The Murrays of Culbin and Pulrossie were also descendants of Richard. The Murray of Culbin coat of arms is recorded as Sable, three stars argent.

== See also ==
- Earl of Sutherland
