= William de Moravia, 1st Earl of Sutherland =

Scottish nobleman (1210–1248)

- de Moravia Earl of Sutherland Coat of Arms
- Born: c.1210
- Died: 1248; Sutherland, Scotland
- Burial place: Dornoch Cathedral, Sutherland, Scotland
- Relatives: Hugh de Moravia (father); William de Moravia, 2nd Earl of Sutherland (son)
- Military career
- Allegiance: Scotland
- Conflicts: Rebellion of 1228 (helped to defeat); Battle of Embo

William de Moravia (William Sutherland) (c. 1210–1248) was a Scottish nobleman, Earl of Sutherland and chief of the Clan Sutherland, a Scottish clan of the Scottish Highlands.

== Ancestry ==
Different sources give different accounts of the ancestors of the Earls of Sutherland. The generally accepted ancestry is that William de Moravia (William Sutherland), 1st Earl of Sutherland in the peerage of Scotland (died 1248) was the son of Hugh de Moravia, who in turn was a grandson of Freskin, a Flemish knight. William Fraser, writing in the 19th century gives a similar account but states that Hugh was actually the son of Freskin, rather than his grandson. Sir Robert Gordon (1580–1656), the 17th century historian of the House of Sutherland, and a younger son of Alexander Gordon, 12th Earl of Sutherland, stated that William de Moravia (William Sutherland), 1st Earl of Sutherland (died 1248) was the son of Hugh, Earl of Sutherland who was nicknamed Hugh Freskin, who was in turn son of Robert Sutherland (Earl of Sutherland and founder of Dunrobin Castle), who was son of Walter Southerland (Earl of Sutherland), who was son of Alane Southerland, Thane of Sutherland.

According to John Stewart-Murray, 7th Duke of Atholl, Hugo or Hugh de Moravia was the second son of Freskin. He was appointed as the first Lord of Sutherland and his son, William, was the first Earl of Sutherland (d. 1248). In Hugo or Hugh's entourage were his cousins, or nephews, Richard de Moravia and Gilbert de Moravia who are said to have been the ancestors of the Murrays of Aberscross. As septs of the Clan Sutherland, the Murrays of Aberscross were the principal vassals of the Earls of Sutherland and were charged with the defence of the shire.

== Earl of Sutherland ==
William de Moravia was granted a charter under the designation of William, Lord of Sutherland in which he confirmed to Gilbert de Moravia, archdeacon of Moray, the lands of Skelbo and others. The charter is undated but is certainly from some time before the year 1222. According to historian William Fraser, William, Lord of Sutherland probably attended Alexander II of Scotland when he marched north at the end of 1222 to punish the men of Caithness, who had murdered their bishop. According to Walter Bower who was the 15th century chronicler who continued the work of the 14th century John of Fordun, in the year 1228 Alexander II of Scotland crushed a rebellion that was led by one Gillescop who with his two sons were captured the following year and their heads sent to the king. The 18th-century historian George Chalmers adds that "the Freskins" probably aided the king in crushing the rebellion and that William Freskin was raised to be the Earl of Sutherland in order to balance out the power and turbulence of the Earl of Caithness.

Another theory as to the creation of the earldom of Sutherland is that it was granted to William, son of Hugh Freskin upon the death in 1231 of Jon Haraldsson who was the last of the ancient Earls of Orkney and Caithness, in which Earl Jon was succeeded by Earl Magnus from whom King Alexander of Scotland took the earldom of Sutherland. However, according to William Fraser, although King Alexander accepted Magnus as Earl of Caithness it cannot be said that he deprived him of the earldom of Sutherland as it is confirmed that the territory of Sutherland had long passed from the allegiance of Norwegian earls and had already been in the possession of Hugh Freskin and his son for some time. Fraser concludes that it is probable that in this period King Alexander conferred the title of earl upon William, Lord of Sutherland.

Even after being created Earl of Sutherland, William rarely appears in contemporary records. However, his territory became civilized and settled with Dornoch Cathedral within it. Evidence of this is found in the constitution drawn up by the new bishop of Caithness, Gilbert de Moravia, who resolved to build the cathedral church as well as assigning fourteen parish churches. Sir Robert Gordon states that Earl William was a great help to Gilbert in doing this work. However, they did not always agree as before the bishop's death in 1245 a feud took place between them over certain lands and although an agreement was reached, it was not settled in their day and was continued by their successors.

Sir Robert Gordon relates the story of the Battle of Embo where William, Earl of Sutherland sent his retainer, Richard de Moravia, brother of Bishop Gilbert, to keep a force of marauding Norwegian invaders in check until he could raise a large enough force to do battle. Richard de Moravia attacked the Norwegians and was killed in the process, the earl coming with reinforcements defeated them and killed their leader. The earl then erected a tomb for Richard de Moravia in Dornoch Cathedral.

According to Sir Robert Gordon, William de Moravia, 1st Earl of Sutherland died in 1248 and was buried in the south aisle of Dornoch Cathedral. This year of death is supported by 19th-century writer William Anderson.

== Family ==
William de Moravia, 1st Earl of Sutherland left only one son, as far as is known, William de Moravia, 2nd Earl of Sutherland.

Peerage of Scotland
New creation	Earl of Sutherland c. 1228-1248	Succeeded by William de Moravia
