= Battle of Skibo and Strathfleet =

Scottish clan battle circa 1455

Coordinates: 57°57′N 4°4′W

- Part of the Scottish clan wars
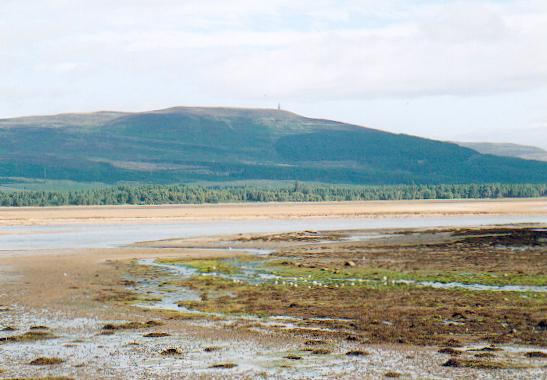
- Sands of Loch Fleet looking towards Strathfleet.
Date	c.1455
Location	Around Dornoch, Sutherland Skibo : N7389; Strathfleet : NH7797
Result	Sutherland victory

Belligerents
Clan Sutherland	Clan Donald and allies

Commanders and leaders
Robert Sutherland; Neil Murray	John of Islay

Strength
500–600	Unknown

Casualties and losses
>50 killed	Unknown

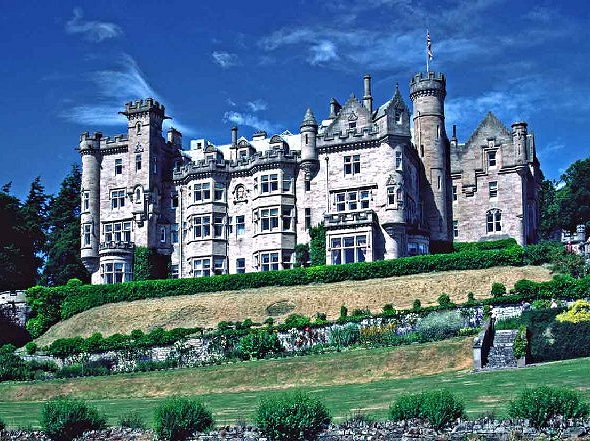
Skibo Castle was largely rebuilt in the 19th and 20th centuries

The Battle of Skibo and Strathfleet was prompted by Clan Donald's invasion of the area around Dornoch in northern Scotland around 1455. Two attacks were repulsed by the local clans of Clan Sutherland and the Murrays of Aberscross.

== Background ==
In 1455, John MacDonald of Islay, Earl of Ross had entered into a secret treaty, in which he agreed to become a vassal of Edward IV of England in return for help in conquering northern Scotland. When James III of Scotland discovered this agreement in 1476, he stripped John of his possessions on the mainland. John spent the next few years trying to reclaim the land he thought was his. When he lent most of his forces to his kinsman Donald Balloch of Islay to ravage the West Coast, John took 500-600 men around the north of Scotland to the Dornoch Firth on the east coast. It's not clear what his intention was, but he landed a few miles from Dunrobin Castle, home to Clan Sutherland who controlled much of the far north of Scotland.

== Battles ==
At first the MacDonalds camped in front of Skibo Castle, a possession of the Bishop of Caithness. John Sutherland, 7th Earl of Sutherland sent a force under Neill Murray to watch the islanders. MacDonald began to ravage the country, so Murray attacked, driving off the invaders who lost a captain named Donald Dubh-na-Soirn, and 50 men.

In response to this defeat, MacDonald sent some of his men and "a company of men from Ross" up the coast to Loch Fleet, just south of Dunrobin. Sutherland sent his brother Robert and some men to meet the attackers "on the sands of Strathfleet". After a "fierce and bloody struggle", the island men and their allies were defeated "with great slaughter" and the survivors pursued as far as Bonar.

== Aftermath ==
This was to be the final conflict between the MacDonalds and Sutherlands, as Sutherland married MacDonald's sister Margaret soon afterwards, sealing an alliance. However this heavy defeat may have been a factor in the conflict between John MacDonald and his son Angus Og, which resulted in the Battle of Bloody Bay in 1480 or 1483.
