= Wester Beath =

Former locality in Fife, Scotland

Wester Beath is a former locality, in the parish of Dunfermline, west of Hill of Beath in Fife, Scotland.

The locality is now represented by the localities of Keirsbeath and Halbeath.

Alexander Murray of Culbin and Newton held the lands in the 13th century.
