= Susan Brown (minister) =

Scottish minister

The Very Reverend Susan Brown
- Moderator of the General Assembly
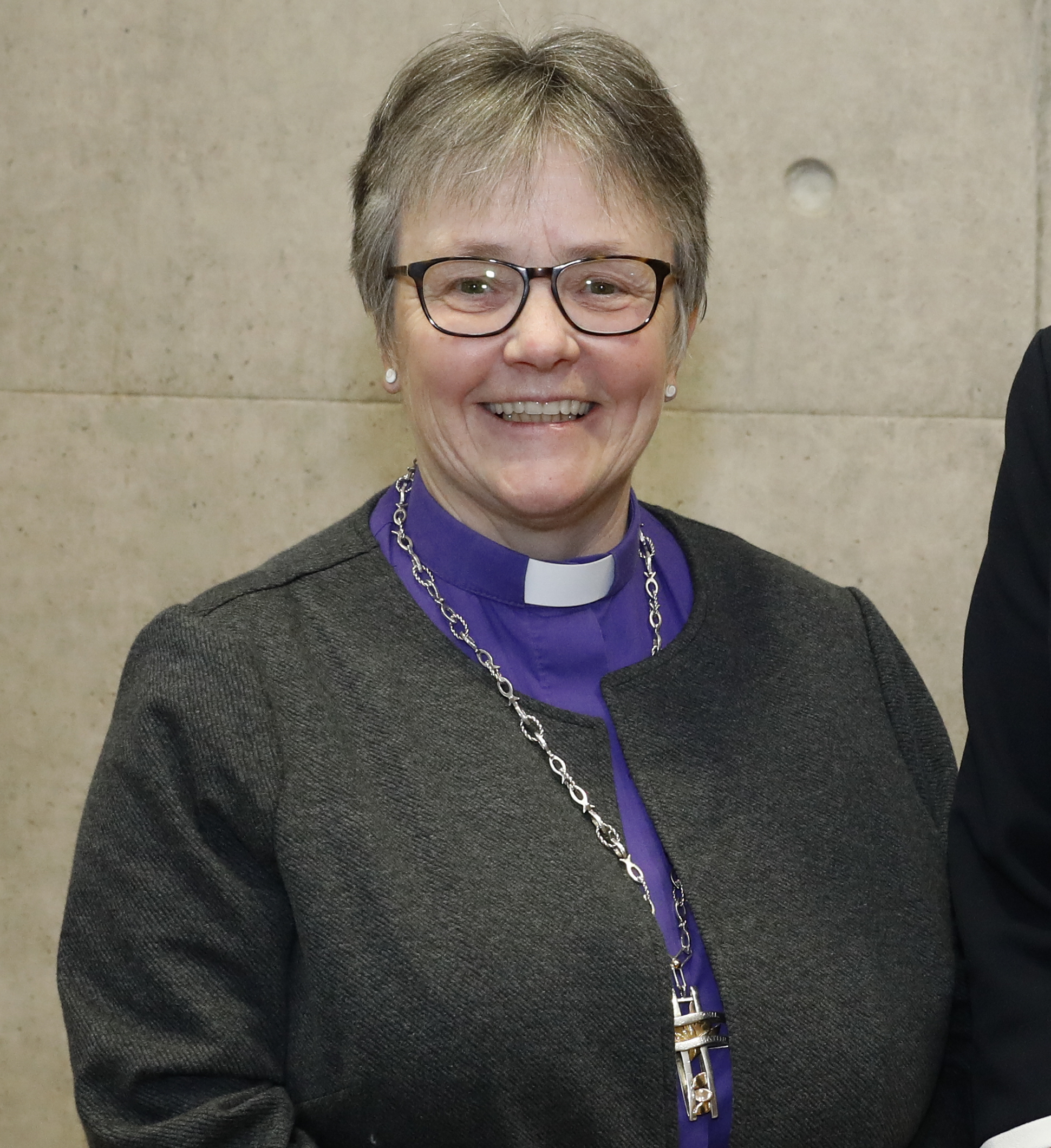
- Brown in 2019
- Church: Church of Scotland
- In office: May 2018 – May 2019
- Predecessor: Derek Browning
- Successor: Colin Sinclair
- Other post: Chaplain-in-Ordinary (2012–present)

Orders
- Ordination: 1985

Personal details
- Born: Susan Marjory Attwell; 12 December 1958 (age 67) Edinburgh, Scotland
- Denomination: Presbyterianism
- Education: University of Edinburgh

Susan Marjory Brown (born 12 December 1958) is a Scottish Presbyterian minister. She was the minister at Dornoch Cathedral for over 23 years, and Honorary Chaplain to the Queen in Scotland. She was the first woman to take charge of a cathedral in the United Kingdom.

== Early life and education ==
Brown was born on 12 December 1958 in Edinburgh, Scotland. She was educated at Penicuik High School, a non-denominational school in Midlothian. She went on to study at the University of Edinburgh, graduating with a Bachelor of Divinity (BD) degree in 1981 and completing a Diploma in Ministry (DipMin) in 1983.

== Ministry ==
Brown served as an assistant minister at St Giles' Cathedral, Edinburgh from 1983 to 1985. Having been ordained in 1985, she served as minister of Killearnan Parish Church near Muir of Ord in Ross-Shire from 1985 to 1998. From 1998 to 2021, she was minister of Dornoch Cathedral in Sutherland. She officiated at the wedding of Madonna and Guy Ritchie in 2000. She also served as Chaplain-in-Ordinary to Queen Elizabeth II from 2010. In 2021 she took up a new position as a worship adviser with Greenlaw Parish Church and its Presbytery (the former Presbytery of Duns in Berwickshire), but retired from full-time ministry in 2024.

On 9 October 2017, it was announced that she had been nominated as the next Moderator of the General Assembly of the Church of Scotland. She took up the position in May 2018 and served until May 2019.

== Personal life ==
In 1981, Susan Attwell married Derek Brown, a fellow minister and hospital chaplain. Together they have two children: one daughter and one son.

== See also ==
- List of moderators of the General Assembly of the Church of Scotland

Religious titles
Preceded by Derek Browning	Moderator of the General Assembly of the Church of Scotland; 2018-2019	Succeeded by Colin Sinclair
