= Derek Browning =

Minister in the Church of Scotland

The Very Reverend Derek Browning
- Moderator of the General Assembly
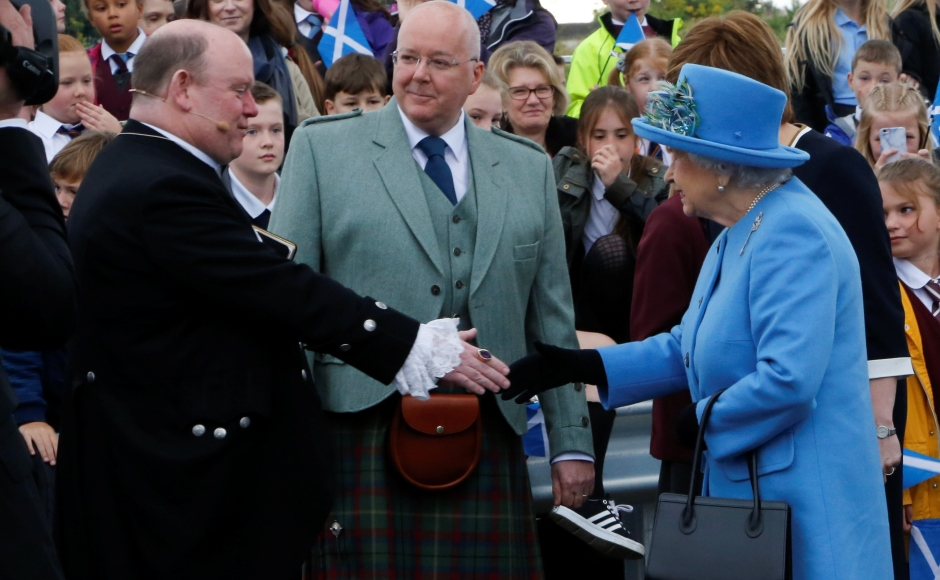
- Blessing the Queensferry Crossing 2017
- Church: Church of Scotland
- In office: May 2017 – May 2018
- Predecessor: Russell Barr
- Successor: Susan Brown

Orders
- Ordination: 1987

Personal details
- Born: 24 May 1962 (age 64)
- Denomination: Presbyterianism
- Residence: Edinburgh
- Occupation: Church of Scotland Minister

Derek Browning (born 24 May 1962) is a minister of the Church of Scotland, who was the Moderator of the General Assembly of the Church of Scotland from May 2017 to May 2018

== Early life and education ==
Derek Browning was born on 24 May 1962 in Edinburgh, Scotland. He was educated at North Berwick High School, a state secondary school in North Berwick, East Lothian. He read history at Corpus Christi College, Oxford, graduating with a Bachelor of Arts (BA) degree; as per tradition, his BA was promoted to a Master of Arts (MA Oxon) degree. He trained for ordained ministry at St Mary's College, St Andrews, and graduated with a Bachelor of Divinity (BD) degree from the University of St Andrews specialising in ecclesiastical history. He later studied at Princeton Theological Seminary, graduating with a Doctor of Ministry (DMin) degree in 1997: he was the first Church of Scotland minister to graduate from Princeton Theological Seminary with a Doctor of Ministry degree. His thesis was on the roles of leadership and the management of change within the Church.

== Ordained ministry ==
Derek Browning served as Probationer Minister at Troon St Meddans in 1986–1987.

He was minister at Cupar Old Parish Church, in Cupar, Fife (1987 to 2001) and thereafter minister at Morningside Parish Church in Edinburgh.

He was Moderator of the Church of Scotland's Presbytery of St Andrews for 1996/1997, Convener of the Prayer and Devotion Committee of the Church of Scotland's Panel on Worship from 2000 to 2004, and Convener of the Church of Scotland's Assembly Arrangements Committee and General Assembly Business Committee.

At the 2019 General Assembly he was appointed convener of the Special Commission on the Effectiveness of the Presbyterian Form of Church Government.

Browning was Moderator of the Presbytery of Edinburgh, 2021–2022.

=== Moderator ===
In October 2016, Browning was nominated to succeed Russell Barr as Moderator of the General Assembly of the Church of Scotland. He took office in May 2017. On 4 September 2017, Browning blessed the new Queensferry Crossing on the River Forth before the Bridge was formally opened by Queen Elizabeth II.

In October 2017, Browning visited Rome where he had a private audience with Pope Francis. Later in October he represented the Church of Scotland at the 500th Anniversary of the German Reformation held in Wittenberg.

In November 2017 during the ‘London visit’ he preached at St Paul’s Cathedral, met with the Prime Minister Theresa May at Downing Street, and preached in the St Mary Undercroft Chapel in the Houses of Parliament. He also met with the Lord Mayor of London.

In January 2018 he visited Israel, Palestine and Jordan, spending time in Jerusalem, Bethlehem, Ramallah, Gaza and Galilee. He rededicated the refurbished St Andrew's Church in Tiberias. In Jordan, he visited the Baptismal Site of Jesus, invited by Prince Ghazi bin Muhammad. Browning also had an audience with King Abdullah II in Amman.

In February 2018 Browning preached in Dunfermline Abbey at the 200th anniversary of the finding of the bones of King Robert the Bruce.

In April 2018 Browning visited London again, preaching at Westminster Abbey, and attended the 2018 Olivier Awards at the Royal Albert Hall.

In May 2018 Browning preached at the Liberation Day service on Guernsey.

== Personal life ==
Derek Browning enjoys reading, cooking and playing croquet. He is a member of the New Club, Edinburgh.

== See also ==
- List of moderators of the General Assembly of the Church of Scotland

== Sources ==
- Who's Who in Scotland 2015, published by Carrick Media, ISBN 978-0-9933162-0-3

Religious titles
Preceded by Russell Barr	Moderator of the General Assembly of the Church of Scotland; 2017-2018	Succeeded by Susan Brown
