= Adam of Melrose =

Bishop of Caithness, Scotland

Adam of Melrose (died 1222) was Abbot of Melrose and Bishop of Caithness, famously burned to death by the husbandmen of Caithness. At the time, Caithness was part of the Jarldom of Orkney, which formed part of the Kingdom of Norway.

Adam rose to the position of Abbot in 1207, and on 5 August 1213, was elected to the bishopric of Caithness, then based at Halkirk. On 11 May 1214, he was consecrated by William de Malveisin, Bishop of St. Andrews, with Walter, Bishop of Glasgow, and Bricius, Bishop of Moray assisting. Adam, along with Bishop Walter and Bishop Bricius, visited Rome in 1218, to obtain absolution from Pope Honorius III for the sentence of excommunication imposed on the Scottish King, Alexander II, and the whole Kingdom of Scotland.

When Adam returned to Caithness in 1219, he began to encounter problems with the inhabitants of his diocese. Bishop Adam had increased the episcopal "tax" imposed on the province's husbandmen, raising it from a span of butter from every twenty cows, to one from every ten. The husbandmen complained to the Jarl, Jon Haraldsson. Disinterested in their complaint, but annoyed by the Bishop for other reasons, he declared:

The devil take the bishop and his butter; you may roast him if you please!.

On 11 September 1222, a group of husbandmen gathered at Halkirk to protest against the bishop's tax increase, shouting Roast him alive!. Serlo, Dean of Newbattle (near Dalkeith), the Bishop's friend and advisor, was sent out to calm the crowd down, but after some initial discussions, the mob killed Serlo. Adam attempted to offer terms, but the infuriated husbandmen forcibly dragged the bishop into his kitchen, and burned the kitchen down with him in it. Adam's body was interred in the church of Skinnet.

A contemporary chronicler, Boethius the Dane, blamed the jarl for Adam's death. Nevertheless, the jarl swore oaths to his own innocence. He was the last jarl to be ethnically Norse.

The events of Adam's death are recounted in the Old Norse short narrative (þáttr) Brenna Adams byskups.

On hearing of the events, Alexander II took the opportunity to assert his claims to the mainland part of the jarldom, by visiting Caithness in person, and hanging the majority of the husbandmen, while mutilating the remainder. Alexander's actions were applauded by Pope Honorius III, and a quarter of a century later, he was continuing to receive commendation, as in a bull of Celestine IV.

In 1239, Adam's successor Gilbert de Moravia (otherwise known as Saint Gilbert of Dornoch) moved the body to the newly established Cathedral at Dornoch.

Catholic Church titles
Preceded by Patrick	Abbot of Melrose; 1207–13	Succeeded by Hugh de Clipstone
Preceded by John	Bishop of Caithness; 1213/4–1222	Succeeded by Gilbert de Moravia
