= Aberscross Castle =

Former Scottish castle

- Aberscross, Highland, Scotland

Site information
- Open to the public: No
- Condition: No remains above ground

Location
- Aberscross Castle
- Coordinates: 57.973540°N 4.082022°W

Site history
- Built: 13th century
- In use: 13th to 17th century

Aberscross Castle (Note: Also known as Abercors Castle) was a castle near the deserted village at Aberscross, near Dornoch, Highland in Scotland.

== History ==
The castle was once the home of Murrays of Aberscross, who settled in the area during the late 12th century. The castle was ruinous by the 17th century. No ruins are located above ground.
