= Kenneth de Moravia, 4th Earl of Sutherland =

Scottish nobleman (died 1333)

- de Moravia Earl of Sutherland Coat of Arms
- Born: Unknown
- Died: 19 July 1333; Halidon Hill, near Berwick-upon-Tweed
- Relatives: William de Moravia, 2nd Earl of Sutherland (father); Marjory or Mary of Mar (wife); William de Moravia, 3rd Earl of Sutherland (brother); William de Moravia, 5th Earl of Sutherland (son)
- Military career
- Allegiance: Scotland
- Conflicts: Battle of Halidon Hill

Kenneth de Moravia (also known as Kenneth Sutherland) (died 19 July 1333) was the 4th Earl of Sutherland and chief of the Clan Sutherland, a Scottish clan of the Scottish Highlands.

== Early life ==
Kenneth de Moravia, 4th Earl of Sutherland was the second son of William de Moravia, 2nd Earl of Sutherland. Kenneth succeeded to the earldom on the death of his brother William de Moravia, 3rd Earl of Sutherland.

== Earl of Sutherland ==
Kenneth first appears on record in December 1330 in a grant from Reginald Moray of Culbin who renounced all his claims to his possessions within the earldom of Sutherland. Kenneth de Moravia, 4th Earl of Sutherland was killed at the Battle of Halidon Hill fighting against the English on 19 July 1333.

== Family ==
According to 17th-century historian Sir Robert Gordon, 1st Baronet, Kenneth de Moravia, 4th Earl of Sutherland married Mary (or Marjorie) the daughter of Domhnall I, Earl of Mar.

They had the following children:

1. William de Moravia, 5th Earl of Sutherland.
2. Nicholas Sutherland, 1st of Duffus, the surname being now fully adopted, ancestor of the Sutherlands, Lords Duffus.
3. Eustachia, married, about December 1330, to Gilbert Moray, son and heir of Reginald Moray of Culbin who himself was a grandson of Richard de Moravia.

== Sources ==
- Balfour, Paul J. (1911) The Scots Peerage Vol. 8. David Douglas. Edinburgh, pages 323–329.
- Fraser, W. (1894) The Sutherland Book Vol. I. Privately Published. Edinburgh, pages 15–37.
- Traquair, Peter (1998) Freedom's Sword: Scotland's Wars of Independence. Roberts Rinehart Publishers. ISBN 9780004720791
- White, G. H. (1953) The Complete Peerage Vol. XII. The St Catherine Press. London

Peerage of Scotland
Preceded by William de Moravia	Earl of Sutherland c. 1330 – 1333	Succeeded by William de Moravia
