= Martin Fair =

The Very Reverend Dr Martin Fair
- Moderator of the General Assembly
- Church: Christ Church: Bermuda (2025 - present); Arbroath: St Andrew's (1992-2023)
- In office: May 2020 - May 2021
- Predecessor: Colin Sinclair
- Successor: Jim Wallace

Orders
- Ordination: 28 January 1992

Personal details
- Denomination: Church of Scotland
- Residence: Bermuda
- Spouse: Elaine
- Children: 3 Sons
- Occupation: Minister of Word and Sacrament
- Education: Strathclyde University, University of Glasgow, Princeton Theological Seminary

William Martin (Martin) Fair (born 25 March 1964) is a minister of the Church of Scotland and was Moderator of its General Assembly from May 2020– May 2021. He has also served as the minister at St Andrews Parish Church in Arbroath, Angus since 1992.

== Early life and education ==
Fair was born in Johnstone on 25 March 1964, the son of William Fair and Georgina Fair (nee. Whitelaw). He grew up in Thornliebank on the southside of Glasgow, Scotland. He

He was educated at Woodfarm High (1969-81), and later at University of Strathclyde (1981-85) for his BA, and University of Glasgow (1985-86) for his BD.

He was brought up in Spiersbridge Church, now called Thornliebank Parish Church

== Ordained ministry ==
Fair worked doing youth and community work from 1985-1986. He was licensed by the Presbytery of Glasgow on 3 July 1989. He served as the assistant to Bearsden: Kilermont (1987-89) and at Christ Church in Bermuda (1989-1991).

He served as the Minister of St Andrew's Parish Church, Arbroath from his ordination on 28 January 1992 until 5 March 2023.

He has served on the Mission & Discipleship Council of the denomination, becoming a vice-convener in time, and chairing the Church Without Walls committee.

On 21 October 2019, it was announced that he had been nominated as the next Moderator of the General Assembly of the Church of Scotland. He was elected to the position by a Commission of Assembly and installed on 16 May 2020. Uniquely, due to the COVID-19 pandemic, Dr Fair was installed as Moderator in a special ceremony attended by a handful of people but live-streamed to the Kirk. Dr Fair moderated an online Assembly held in October 2020 in place of the usual Assembly which would have been held in May 2020. He was succeeded as Moderator by Jim Wallace, Baron Wallace of Tankerness in May 2021.

In 2023, he took up the role of Pathways to Ministry Manager, as part of the Faith Action Programme team of the Church of Scotland. This included setting up a new apprentice ministry scheme.

On 15 October 2025, he was inducted as Minister of Christ Church, Warwick, Bermuda, a Church of Scotland parish in which he had served during his training.

== Personal life ==
He is married to Elaine Fair (nee. Wiley). Together they have three sons: Callum, Andrew and Fraser. His wife Elaine, was a primary school teacher by profession, and was his childhood sweetheart. They were married on 4 July 1987. The couple grew up on the same street and attended the same school.

In the autumn of 2017 he fell awkwardly and was left without the use of his left arm.

== See also ==
- List of moderators of the General Assembly of the Church of Scotland

Religious titles
Preceded by Colin Sinclair	Moderator of the General Assembly of the Church of Scotland; 2020-2021	Succeeded by Jim Wallace, Baron Wallace of Tankerness
