= Russell Barr =

The Very Reverend Russell Barr
- Moderator of the General Assembly
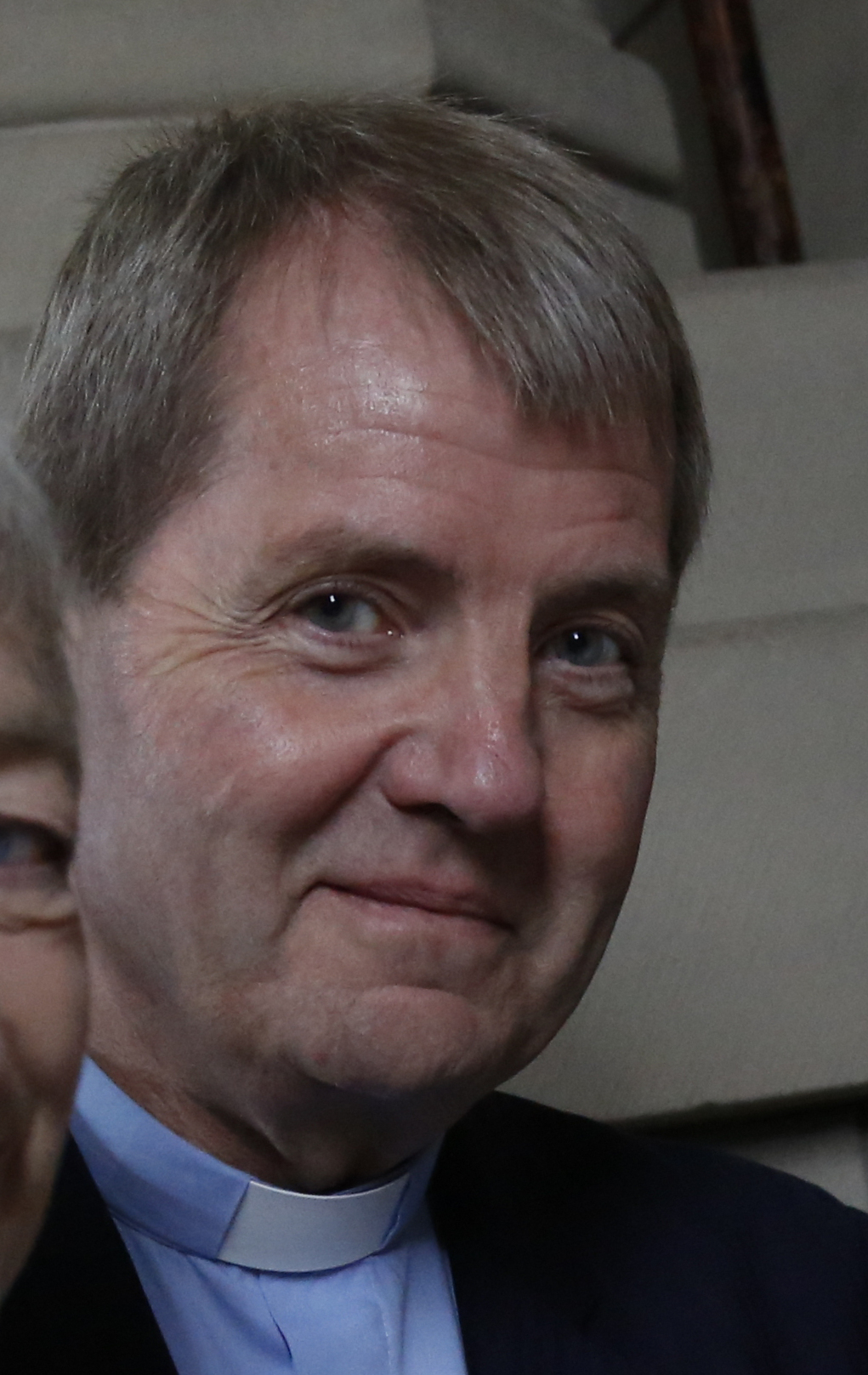
- Barr in 2017
- Church: Church of Scotland
- In office: May 2016 – May 2017
- Predecessor: Angus Morrison
- Successor: Derek Browning

Personal details
- Born: George Russell Barr; 15 October 1953 (age 72)
- Denomination: Presbyterianism

Russell Barr (born 15 October 1953) is a minister of the Church of Scotland, who was nominated in late 2015 to be the next Moderator of the General Assembly of the Church of Scotland.

== Early life and education ==
Barr was born on 15 October 1953 in Kilmarnock, Scotland. His parents were George, a GP, and Isobel, a theatre sister. His schooling days were spent at Kilmarnock Academy. He was active in a local Boy's Brigade company.

He left school with no qualifications, and a dream to become a professional golfer. He played off of scratch through his very regular playing, and he won many competitions as a teenager.

Through persuasion by his parents, he enrolled at Langside College in Glasgow. Through an inspirational history teacher, Bill Hodgson, he was able to pass exams. He made the choice to go to Edinburgh University, beginning in 1972. Through the university, he studied a degree in history and philosophy, graduating in 1975, as well an honours and master's degree in theology from New College. The latter was completed in 1993. He won the divinity honours class prize and in 1978 was awarded the Sir Will Y Darling Memorial prize as student of the year.

He received a doctorate of ministry from Princeton Theological Seminary in 2000.

He once had a summer job freezing peas as Salvesen's near Granton.

== Ordained ministry ==
His probationary year was in Edgerston, near Jedburgh, in the Borders of Scotland. From there, he was called to Garthamlock and Craigend East, in the Easterhouse area of Glasgow from 1979 to 1988. He then served at Greenock St Luke's from 1988 to 1993. From 1993, he was the minister of Cramond Kirk in Edinburgh. Russell Barr retired as minister of Cramond Kirk in October 2020, leading his last acts of worship as Minister on Sunday 25 October 2020.

In 1999, he formed the charity, Fresh Start, which helps people who have been homeless establish themselves in their new home.

In 2011, he was Moderator of the Presbytery of Edinburgh.

In October 2015 he was nominated to succeed Right Rev Dr Angus Morrison as Moderator of the General Assembly of the Church of Scotland. He took office in May 2016. He was succeeded as Moderator by Dr Derek Browning in May 2017.

== Personal life ==
Barr is married to Margaret, a retired secondary school biology teacher. They met while studying at Edinburgh University. They have one son, Robert, and a daughter, Lindsey. They have three grandchildren: Eva, Caterina and Alessandro. After retiring from Cramond Kirk, they now live in St Andrews.

He enjoys playing golf for fun.

== See also ==
- List of moderators of the General Assembly of the Church of Scotland

Religious titles
Preceded by Angus Morrison	Moderator of the General Assembly of the Church of Scotland; 2016-2017	Succeeded by Derek Browning
