= Pulrossie =

Farm in Sutherland, in the Highland council area of Scotland

Coordinates: 57°51′59″N 4°9′2″W

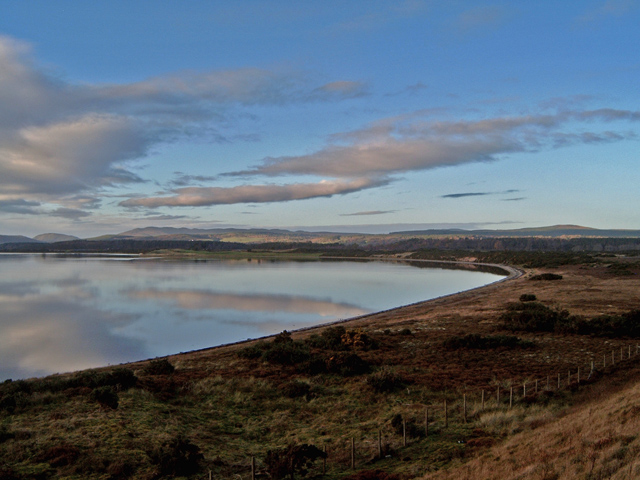

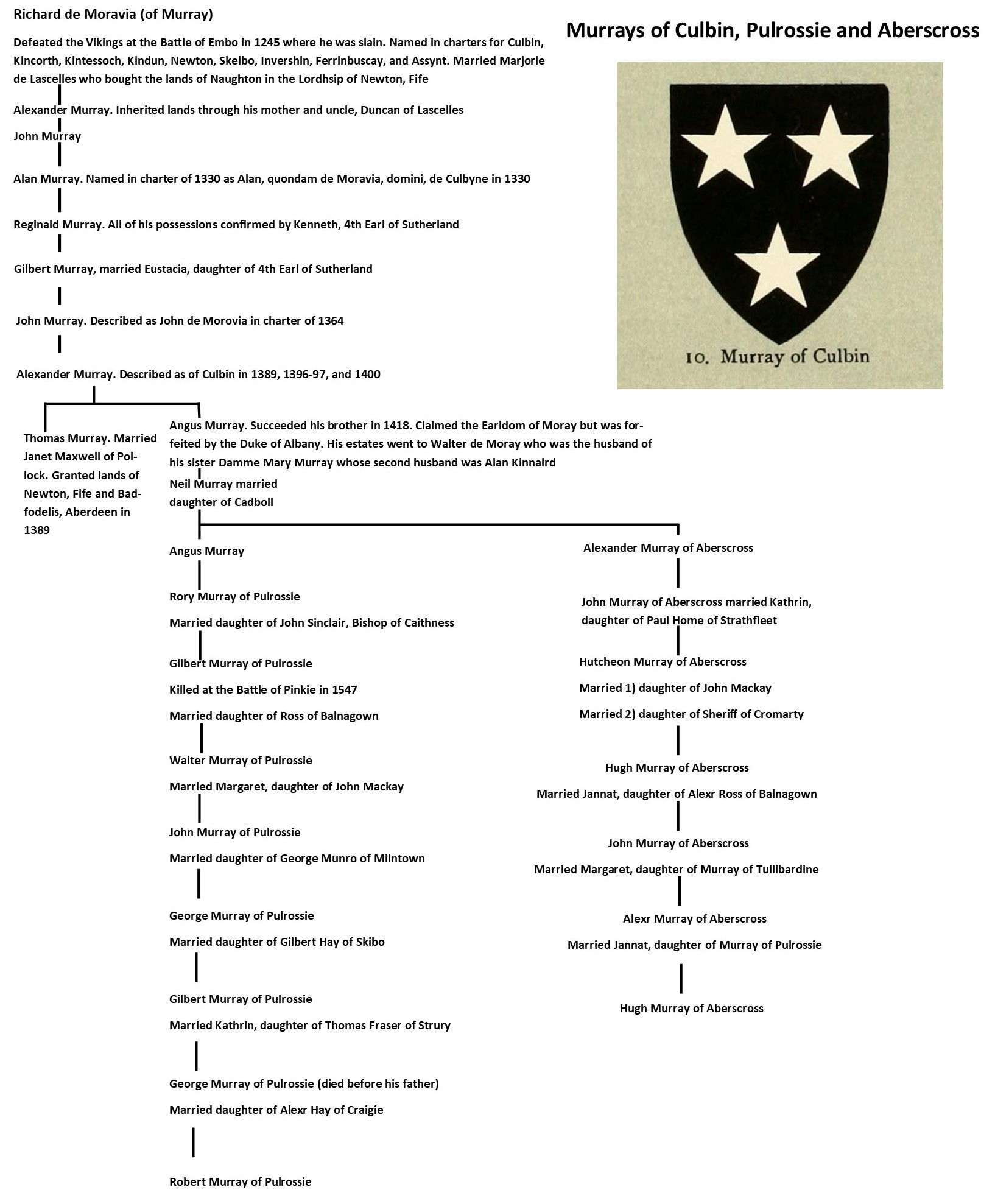
Connection of the Murray of Culbin, Pulrossie and Aberscross families. The Culbin lineage is sourced from Sinclair Ross's The Culbin Sands - Fact and Fiction. The Pulrossie and Aberscross descent is in accordance with Sir Robert Gordon's Genealogical Tables, folios 23 and 24, which also show many siblings for each generation. The Murray of Culbin coat of arms is taken from George Harvey Johnston's The Heraldry of the Murrays (1910) which in turn is sourced from Sir Robert Forman's MS of the Lyon Office dated c. 1566

Pulrossie is a farm in Sutherland, in the Highland council area of Scotland. It is situated on the northern shore of the Kyle of Sutherland, 8 km west of Dornoch. Skibo Castle is 1.5 km to the north-east, while Meikle Ferry is 1.5 km south-east.

== History ==
The estate was held by the Murray of Pulrossie family. The former manor house has been demolished. The Murray family of Pulrossie was a branch of the Murray family of Culbin House, Moray, being descended from the second son of Alexander Murray of Culbin, descendant of Richard de Moravia (Richard Murray, d. 1245). Alexander Murray of Culbin had two sons, Thomas, who was described as a "hero of Harlaw" in 1411 and Angus who succeeded his brother Thomas. In 1430, the estate of Thomas Neilson Mackay was divided up between Angus Murray of Pulrossie and Mackay's two brothers after he had murdered Mowat of Freswick and burnt the St Duthus Church in Tain. Angus Murray had been given the lands of Pulrossie from the Crown for his services in capturing Mackay who was then executed at Inverness. (See: Battle of Drumnacoub). In 1464, John of Islay, Earl of Ross disposed of Pulrossy to his brother Celestine of the Isles. In 1467, the Earl of Sutherland received the lands of Pulrossie from the Crown.

In the 16th century, Gilbert Murray the laird of Pulrossie married a daughter of John Mackay, 11th of Strathnaver, and was later killed at the Battle of Pinkie in 1547. Another of Mackay's daughters married Murray of Aberscross.

In 1550 or 1551, William Murray of the family of Pulrossie murdered John Sutherland of Killipheder on the Nether Green in the west corner of the garden at Dunrobin Castle and this was in revenge for an attack on Alexander Gordon, brother of John Gordon, 11th Earl of Sutherland. However, William Murray of Pulrossie was later killed in revenge for this by Sutherland, the laird of Clyne.

In 1618, Sir Robert Gordon, 1st Baronet, who was tutor to the Earl of Sutherland, wrote to Murray of Pulrossie instructing him to remove the red and white lines from his men's tartan in order to make their dress similar to the other septs of the Clan Sutherland. Pulrossie was chief of the Murrays in Sutherland, but was a "branch chief" under the Earl of Sutherland.

In 1623, the laird of Pulrossie held joint command of the centre of Sir Robert Gordon, 1st Baronet's army that marched into Caithness and took the surrender of George Sinclair, 5th Earl of Caithness, who had been declared a rebel.

After the Scottish Civil War of the mid-17th century, the Murray laird of Pulrossie was fined for having sided against the Royalists.

== Etymology ==
The name Pulrossie may be of Pictish origin meaning "promontory peninsula". The first element may be *pul meaning "a pool", and the second *ros meaning "promontory".
