= Newton, Forgan =

Locality in Fife, Scotland

Newton is a locality and farm in the parish of Forgan, Fife, Scotland, and the historic seat of the Barony of Newton of Forgan. It lies 1.2 miles (1.9 km) south of Wormit in Fife, Scotland.

== History ==
Newton was held by the Lacelles family until the estate passed by the marriage of Marjorie Lascelles to Richard de Moravia in the 13th century. The estate passed by marriage of the heiress Gyles Murray to Thomas Kinnaird, in the 15th century.

in 1391, Alexander de Moriava was recorded as "dominus de Newtone"(lord of Newton), and Newton was described as the place where his three chief pleas were held.

In 1697 Easter Newton was recorded as being united into the barony of Newton.

The present farm building in Newton incorporates a vaulted chamber from the seventeenth-century house that formerly stood on the site.

On 3 March 1712, George Leslie of Newton granted a disposition and conveyance in favour of John Leslie of Newton. The deed records the sale and conveyance of "the lands of Newton with the Barony thereof", together with their rights and pertinents, providing documentary evidence of a further transmission within the Leslie family.

The lands of Newton subsequently came into the possession of the Walker family. Alexander Walker acquired the lands from Sir John Leslie, son of the Earl of Rothes, about 1650.

By the nineteenth century, the lands of Newton were the property of the Earl of Zetland.
