= William de Moravia, 3rd Earl of Sutherland =

Scottish nobleman

- de Moravia Earl of Sutherland Coat of Arms
- Born: Unknown
- Died: c.1325 Sutherland, Scotland
- Relatives: William de Moravia, 2nd Earl of Sutherland (father); Kenneth de Moravia, 4th Earl of Sutherland (brother)
- Military career
- Allegiance: Scotland
- Conflicts: Battle of Bannockburn

William de Moravia (also known as William Sutherland) (fl. early 14th century) was the 3rd Earl of Sutherland and chief of the Clan Sutherland, a Scottish clan of the Scottish Highlands.

== Early life ==
William de Moravia, 3rd Earl of Sutherland was the son of William de Moravia, 2nd Earl of Sutherland. He succeeded his father while still an infant and was put under the guardianship of John, son of William II, Earl of Ross who wrote to Edward II of England to say that William of Sutherland did not have the experience to govern his earldom. In the same letter, the Earl of Ross tells King Edward that Robert the Bruce had advanced north with a large army which he and the other supporters of Edward were unable to withstand and so requested the fealty of the earldom of Sutherland. The Earl of Ross subsequently made a truce with Bruce at Auldearn on 31 October 1308. This letter by the Earl of Ross was written in either April or early May 1308.

== Earl of Sutherland ==
The young William, 3rd Earl of Sutherland was present at the parliament held at St Andrews on 16 March 1308-09 where the nobles and barons of Scotland wrote to Philip V of France who had asked for assistance in his crusade against the Saracens. According to 19th-century historian William Fraser the statement of 17th-century historian Sir Robert Gordon, 1st Baronet that the Earl of Sutherland fought for the Bruce against the English at the Battle of Bannockburn probably refers to the 3rd Earl but there is no contemporary record of this. William, 3rd Earl of Sutherland was also a signatory to the Declaration of Arbroath in 1320.

William, 3rd Earl of Sutherland is believed to have died in 1325, but according to Fraser he may have lived a few years longer and have been the Earl of Sutherland who appears in the Exchequer Rolls of Scotland in 1327 as guardian of the bishopric of Caithness, but that the Earl's Christian name is not given. William was succeeded by his brother, Kenneth de Moravia, 4th Earl of Sutherland.

Peerage of Scotland
Preceded by William de Moravia	Earl of Sutherland; 1307–1325	Succeeded by Kenneth de Moravia
