= Col Sinclair =

Australian rules footballer

Personal information
- Full name: Colin Sinclair
- Born: 14 July 1896; Essendon, Victoria
- Died: 19 February 1959 (aged 62); Westgarth, Victoria
- Original team: South Melbourne Juniors

Playing career^{1}
Years	Club	Games (Goals)
1915, 1918	Essendon	11 (4)
- ^{1} Playing statistics correct to the end of 198.

Colin Sinclair (14 July 1896 – 19 February 1959) was an Australian rules footballer who played with Essendon in the Victorian Football League (VFL).
