= Halkirk =

Village in Caithness, Scotland

Coordinates: 58.51°N 3.49°W

Halkirk: Scottish Gaelic: Hàcraig
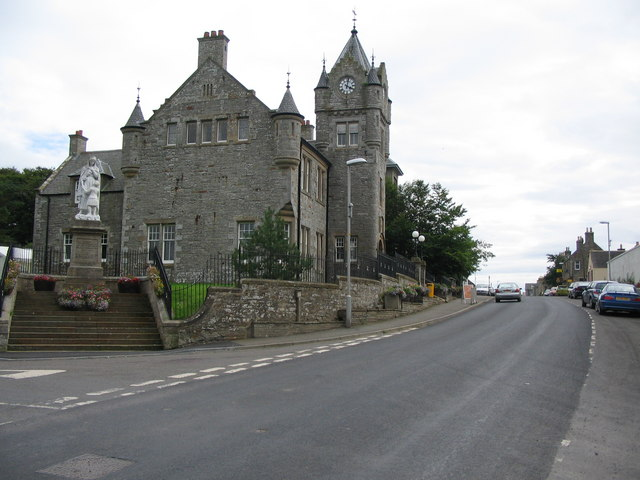
- Halkirk looking towards the war memorial and the Ross Institute

- Location within the Caithness area
- Area: 1.12 km^{2} (0.43 sq mi)
- Population: 950 (2020)
  - Density: 848/km^{2} (2,200/sq mi)
- OS grid reference: ND130594
  - Edinburgh: 177 mi (285 km)
  - London: 502 mi (808 km)
- Council area: Highland
- Lieutenancy area: Caithness
- Country: Scotland
- Sovereign state: United Kingdom
- Post town: HALKIRK
- Postcode district: KW12
- Dialling code: 01847
- Police: Scotland
- Fire: Scottish
- Ambulance: Scottish
- UK Parliament: Caithness, Sutherland and Easter Ross
- Scottish Parliament: Caithness, Sutherland and Ross constituency in the Highlands and Islands electoral region

Halkirk (Scottish Gaelic: Hàcraig) is a village on the River Thurso in Caithness, in the Highland council area of Scotland. From Halkirk the B874 road runs towards Thurso in the north and towards Georgemas in the east. The village is within the parish of Halkirk, and is said by locals to be Scotland's first planned village.

== History ==
=== Bishopric ===
The village was at one time the site of the cathedral of the Diocese of Caithness. In the early 13th century, a revolt against the tithe, imposed by the Bishop, led the local husbandmen to lay siege to the cathedral kitchen, and burn it down, with Adam of Melrose, the Bishop, still inside.

In 1222 Jon Haraldsson, the last native Scandinavian to be Jarl of Orkney, was indirectly implicated in the burning of Adam of Melrose at his hall at Halkirk by local farmers when this part of Caithness was still part of the Kingdom of Norway. A contemporary chronicler, Boethius the Dane blamed Haraldsson for the bishop's death. After the jarl swore oaths to his own innocence, Alexander II took the opportunity to assert his claims to the mainland part of the Orkney jarldom. He visited Caithness in person, and hanged the majority of the farmers, while mutilating the rest. His actions were applauded by Pope Honorius III, and a quarter of a century later, he was continuing to receive commendation from the Catholic Church, as in the reward of a bull from Pope Celestine IV.

Adam's successor Gilbert de Moravia moved the seat of the Diocese to Dornoch, and there are no remains of the Halkirk cathedral church or the bishop's seat.

=== Distilling ===
Halkirk has had two whisky distilleries, Gerston from 1796 to 1885, and Ben Morven (also known as Gerston II) from 1886 to circa 1911. Both were established on the banks of the River Thurso, near Gerston Farm, and both drew water from Calder Burn.

The original Gerston distillery was first registered by a Francis Swanson, and was expanded by two sons, John and James, in 1825. Sir Robert Peel is said to have acquired a taste for the whisky. The distillery closed not long after it was sold to new owners in 1872, and a London company, calling themselves the Gerston Distillery Company, decided to build a new distillery. In 1897 the new distillery was sold to Northern Distilleries Limited, who gave it the Ben Morven name. It was never very successful, and it closed circa 1911. The stillhouse is still standing.

The Ben Morven distillery was named for the mountain, the highest point in Caithness.

=== Poorhouse ===
Fairview House is a former poorhouse dating from 1856, which is now a residential complex.

=== Notable residents ===
Halkirk is the birthplace of Alexander Keith (1795–1873), who settled in Halifax, Nova Scotia and became established as a respected politician and brewer. He is known across Canada for his most famous beer, Alexander Keith's India Pale Ale.

The New Zealand based physiologist, Prof John Malcolm FRSE (1873–1954) was also born and raised in Halkirk.

== Gallery ==
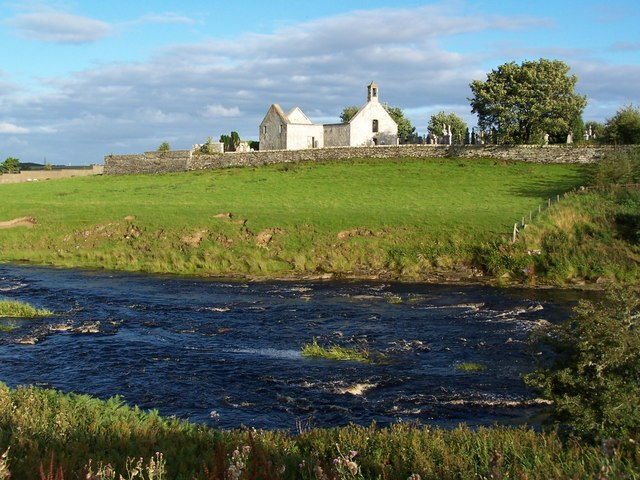
The old parish church, now abandoned

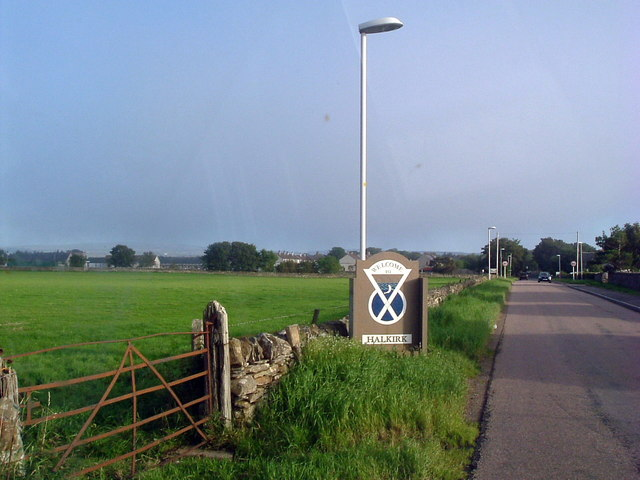
Entering Halkirk

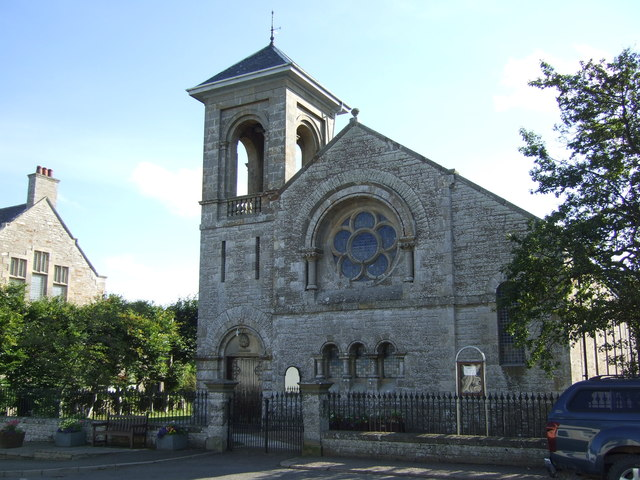
Halkirk and Westerdale Parish Church

== Notes ==
- Ordnance Survey grid reference for Halkirk Bridge: ND130594
- Ordnance Survey grid reference for Gerston Farm: ND129595
