= Colin Sinclair (minister) =

Minister of the Church of Scotland

The Very Reverend Colin Sinclair
- Moderator of the General Assembly
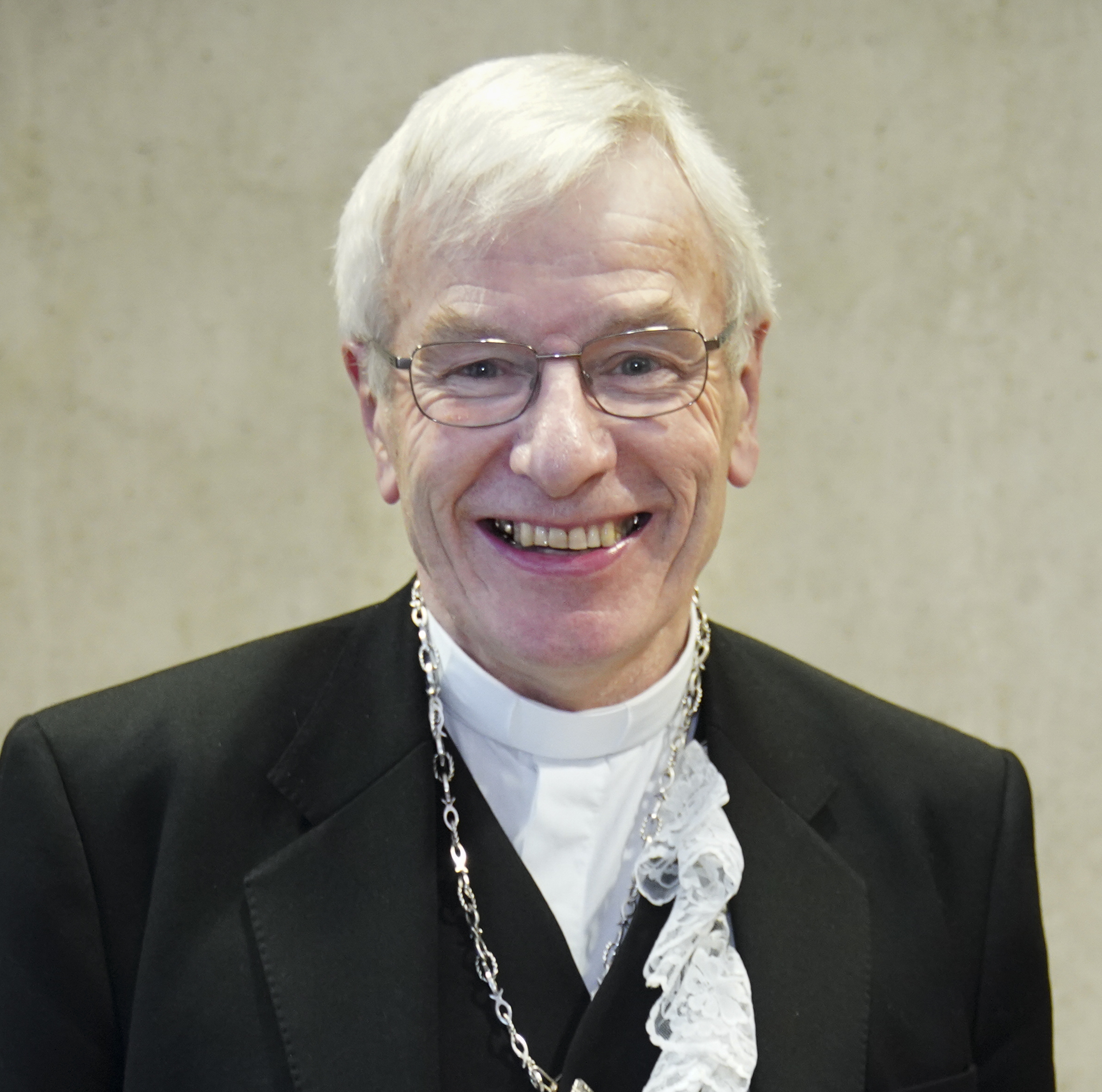
- Sinclair in 2020
- Church: Church of Scotland
- In office: May 2019 to May 2020
- Predecessor: Susan Brown
- Successor: Martin Fair

Orders
- Ordination: 1981

Personal details
- Born: 16 September 1953 (age 72)
- Denomination: Presbyterianism
- Occupation: Church Minister

Colin Andrew Macalister Sinclair (born 16 September 1953) is a minister of the Church of Scotland. He was Moderator of the General Assembly for the year from May 2019. He served as the minister at Palmerston Place Church in Edinburgh from 1996 to June 2022.

== Early life and education ==
Sinclair was born on 16 September 1963 to Andrew and Isobel Sinclair (nee. McCulloch). He grew up in Glasgow, Scotland and was educated at Glasgow Academy, a private school in the city. He studied economics at the University of Stirling (1970-74): he was an extra in a Monty Python film during this time. He graduated with an honours degree at the age of 20.

He became a Christian while at school, his parents had been rare church-goers, and became involved in the Scripture Union (SU). He continued to be involved with the SU while at university, and also attended the Christian Union. Feeling the call to ministry, he successfully underwent selection for the Church of Scotland. However, he was offered the opportunity to work with the SU in Zambia, where he spent the next three years (1974-1977). Having returned to Scotland, he trained for the ministry at New College, Edinburgh (1977-1980), graduating with a further degree in church history.

== Ordained ministry ==
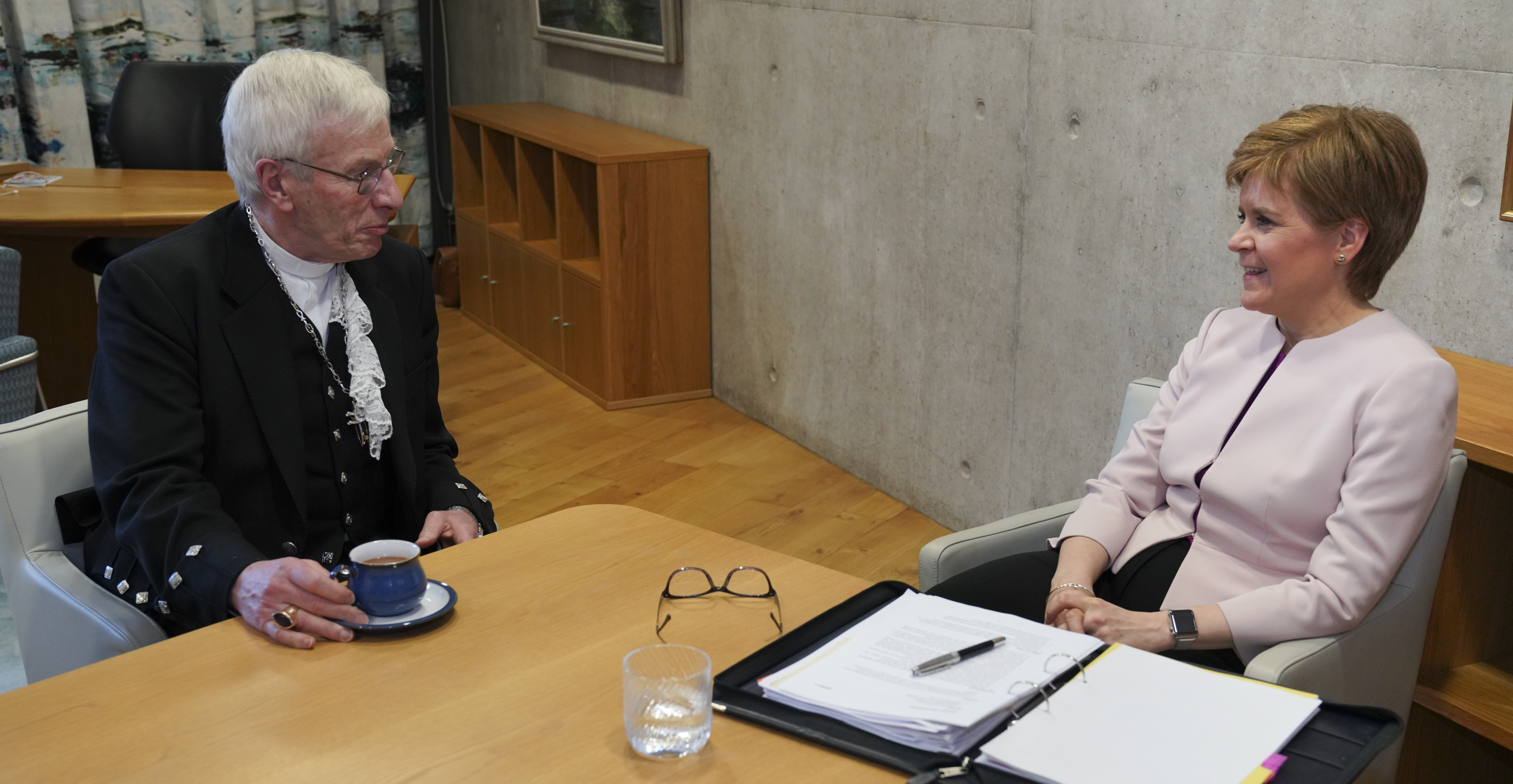
Meeting with the First Minister of Scotland, February 2020

He was licensed by the Presbytery of Glasgow in June 1980, and served as the assistant at Palmerston Place church in Edinburgh (1980-82). He was ordained by the Presbytery of Edinburgh on 4 May 1981.

He served as minister of Newton-on-Ayr Parish Church from 28 March 1982. He demitted from there to become the General Director of Scripture Union in their Glasgow office on 1 August 1988.

In addition to his parish duties, he has also served as International Chair of Scripture Union since 2004, has led Scripture Union holiday camps for children in the Scottish Highlands, was Convener of the Church of Scotland's Mission & Discipleship Council (2012-2016) and has served as Chair of the Spring Harvest Council. Sinclair is within the evangelical wing of the Church of Scotland, having also spoken at the 'Church of Scotland Evangelical Network'.

He returned to parish Ministry at Palmerston Place from 28 August 1996, but retired from there in June 2022

On 9 October 2018 it was announced that he had been nominated as the next Moderator of the General Assembly of the Church of Scotland. He took up the position in May 2019.

He subsequently retired to Peebles.

== Personal life ==
On 2 June 1981 he married Ruth Murray; they have a son and three daughters. His son, Timothy, is also a minister in the Church of Scotland, serving at Partick Trinity Parish Church since 2018, and his eldest daughter, Joanna (Jo) was ordained as assistant minister at Holy Trinity Church in Edinburgh in January 2026.

== See also ==
- List of moderators of the General Assembly of the Church of Scotland

Religious titles
Preceded by Susan Brown	Moderator of the General Assembly of the Church of Scotland; 2019-2020	Succeeded by Martin Fair
