= Kincorth House =

Scottish manor house

- near Forres, Moray, Scotland
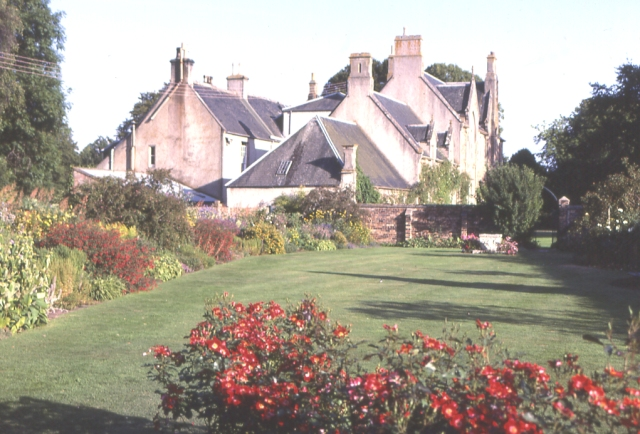

Location
- Coordinates: 57.6335°N 3.6559°W

Kincorth House is a Category B listed 18th-century manor house, near Forres, Moray, in Scotland.

== History ==
The Murray of Culbin family held the lands in the 13th century.

A medieval chapel, once existed nearby, that was dedicated to St Ninian. There are no remains above ground of the chapel.
