= Battle of Embo =

13th-century Scottish battle

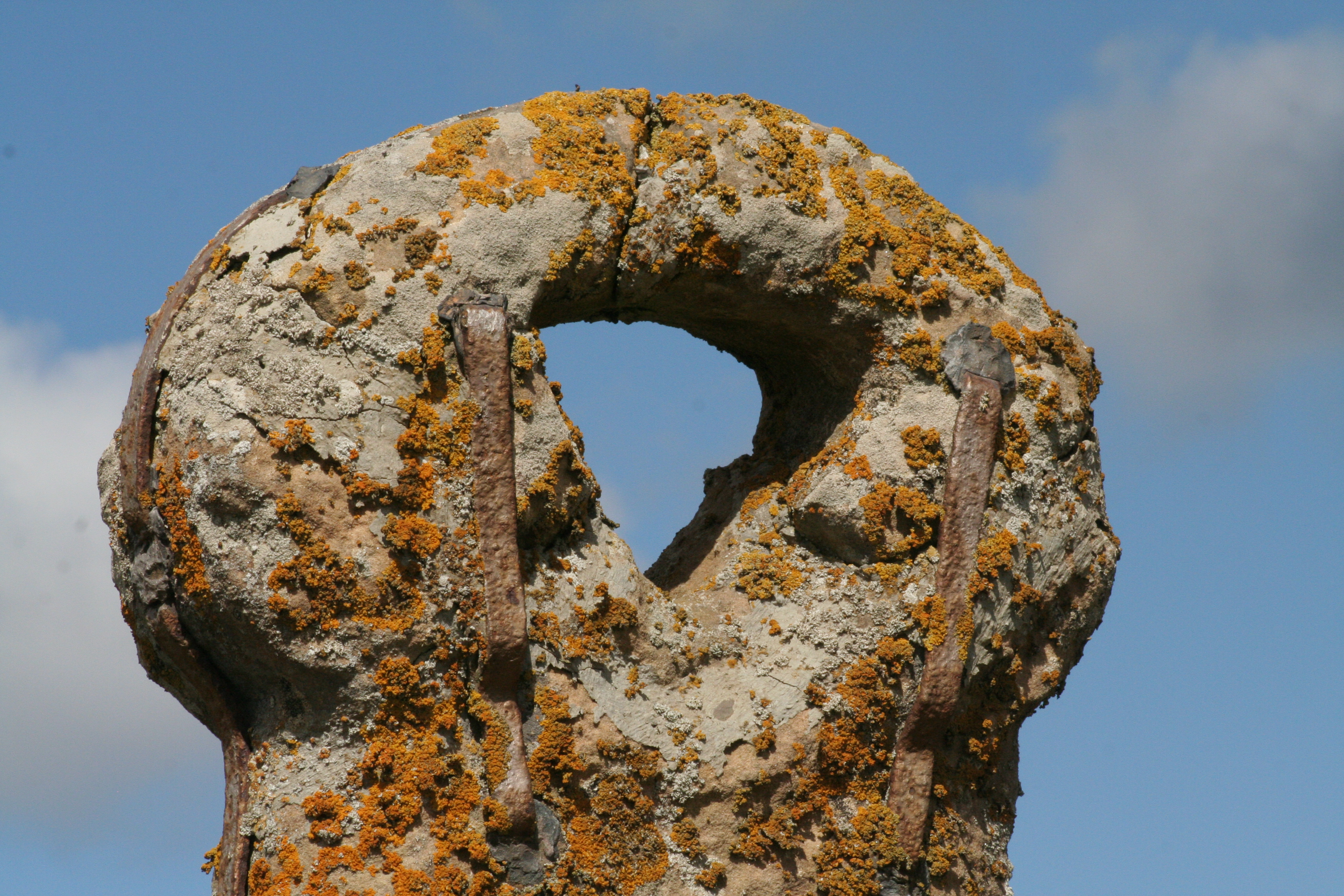
- The Earl's Cross which marks the site of the battle
Date	1245
Location	Embo, Sutherland, Scotland
Result	Scottish victory

Belligerents
Kingdom of Scotland	(Danish Realm) Kingdom of Denmark; Kingdom of Norway

Commanders and leaders
William Sutherland; Richard Murray †	unknown †

The Battle of Embo took place at Embo in Sutherland, Scotland in 1245. It was fought by Scottish forces against Viking invaders who were defeated.

== The battle ==
The first account of the Battle of Embo was written by Sir Robert Gordon, 1st Baronet (1580–1656) in his A Genealogical History of the Earldom of Sutherland. Gordon states that the "Danes and Norwegians" (Vikings) invaded the northern part of the kingdom of Scotland and that William de Moravia, 1st Earl of Sutherland sent his "servant" Richard de Moravia (Richard Morray) to hold the rebels until the earl himself could arrive with a larger force to oppose them. According to Gordon, the Danes then fled being pursued by the earl and during the battle the general of the Danes was killed with many others, as well as Richard de Moravia. The earl apparently secured the victory when he killed the Danish general with the severed leg of a horse.

== Aftermath ==
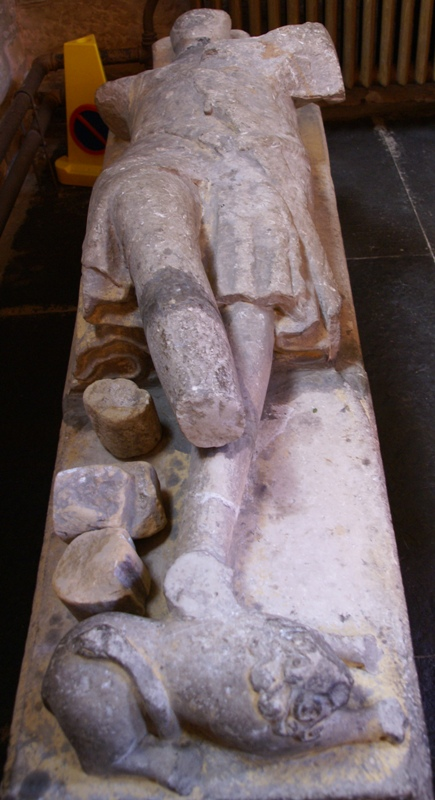
Tomb of Richard de Moravia in Dornoch Cathedral

The Earl of Sutherland arranged for Richard de Moravia to be buried in Dornoch Cathedral and for a statue to be erected of him. A cross was also erected in memory of the battle which along with burials of "divers" killed in the battle, could still be seen in the 17th century.
