= Skelbo Castle =

Castle in Highland, Scotland

- Near Dornoch, Highland, Scotland
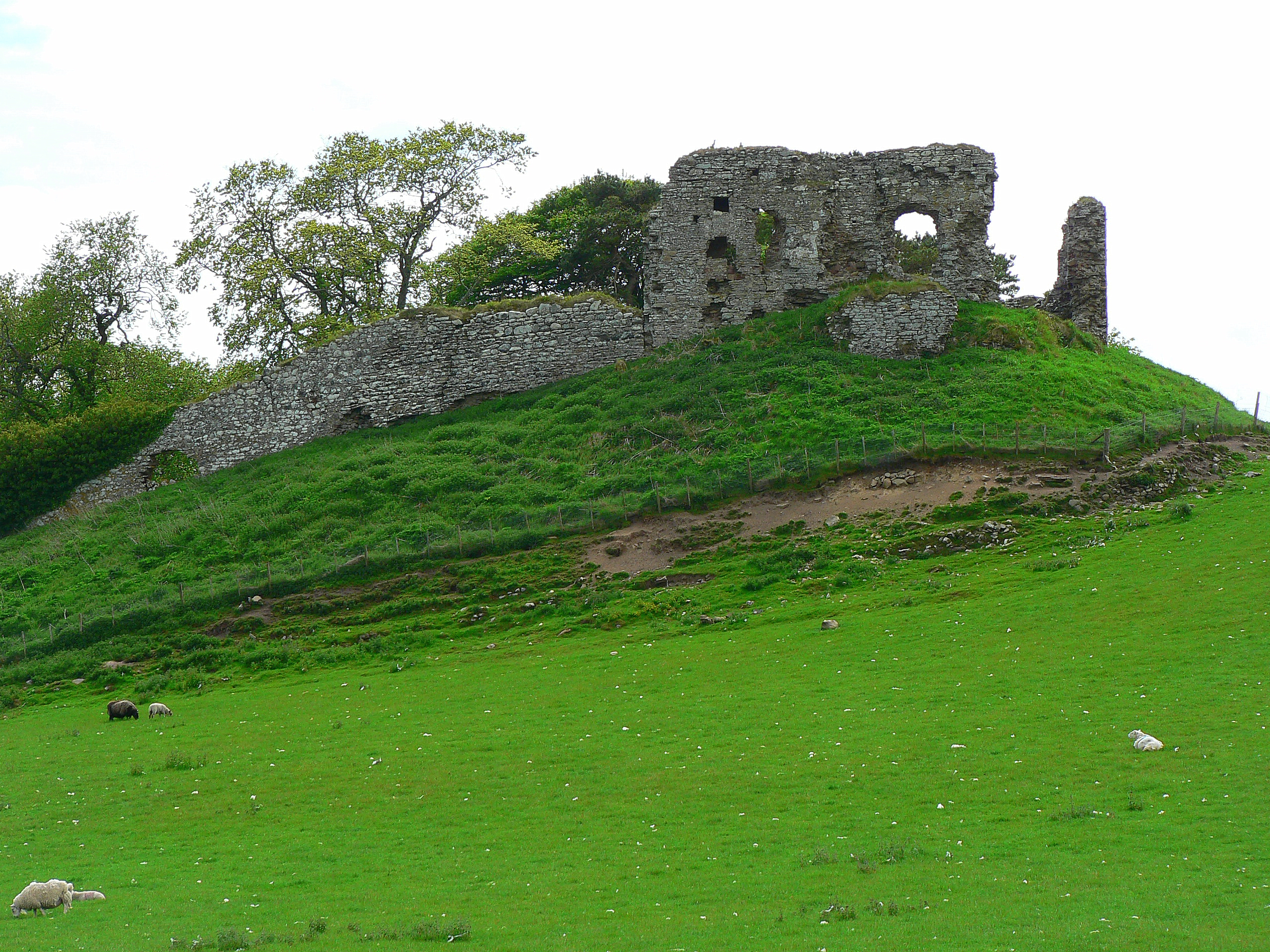
- Skelbo Castle ruins

Location
- Location within Highland council area
- Location within Highland
- Coordinates: 57.929828°N 4.041144°W

Skelbo Castle is a ruined 14th century keep, located near Dornoch, Sutherland, Scotland. The remaining wall is best preserved at the northern side of the castle. The remains are protected as a scheduled monument. The castle is located at a former ferry crossing and commanded views over Loch Fleet.

== History ==
Hugh de Moravia granted Skelbo in 1211 to Gilbert de Moravia the Bishop of Caithness. In 1235, the castle was granted to Richard de Moravia by his brother Gilbert de Moravia, Bishop of Caithness. King Edward I of England's commissioners were awaiting the arrival of Margaret, Maid of Norway at Skelbo Castle, when they learned of her death in Orkney in September 1290, aged 7 years, whilst on her voyage from Norway to Scotland, to assume the Scottish throne.

In 1308, Robert the Bruce captured a castle at the site belonging to the Sutherlands.

In 1494, Marjory Mowat widow of John of Kinnaird disputed ownership of the castle with Thomas of Kinnaird. The court ordered a lawyer to interview the witnesses to a charter. In 1494, the Murrays of Aberscross were also in dispute with the Kinnaird family over the ownership of Skelbo Castle which eventually went to the Kinnairds, who, like the Murrays, were also descended from Richard de Moravia.

In 1529, the castle was bought by William Sutherland, 6th of Duffus who entered into a contract with John Kinnaird Of that Ilk to pay him 2300 merks by installments and for each installment he received certain lands including Skelbo to be held from the Earl of Sutherland as overlord. Kinnaird also conveyed to him, the lands of Aberscors, Invershin and others with the whole sale and transfer of Skelbo finally taking place on 15 September 1529.

A 16th-century house was built adjacent, but the whole site was abandoned as a residence in the 20th century.

- Mikhail de Buar (d.2009) – last owner of the castle, who died without the testament. His legacy is now the subject of a major scandal and litigation in Russia.

== See also ==
- Castles in Scotland
