= Loch Fleet =

Sea loch on the east coast of Scotland

Loch Fleet National Nature Reserve
- IUCN category IV (habitat/species management area)
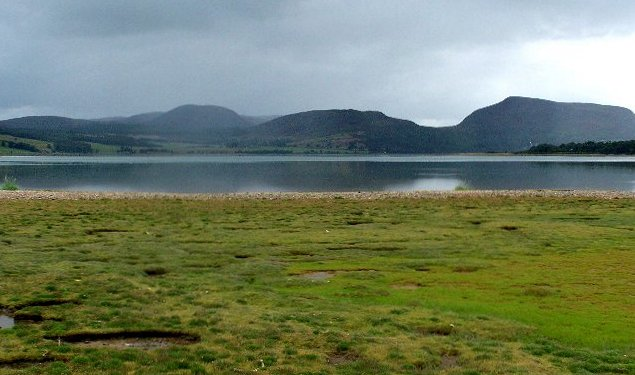
- View from Littleferry looking inland.

- Location within Sutherland
- Location: Sutherland, Scotland
- Coordinates: 57°57′N 4°4′W
- Area: 1,058 ha (4.08 sq mi)
- Designation: NatureScot
- Established: 1998
- Website: Loch Fleet NNR

Ramsar Wetland
- Official name: Dornoch Firth and Loch Fleet
- Designated: 24 March 1997
- Reference no.: 897

Loch Fleet (Scottish Gaelic: Loch Fleòid) is a sea loch on the east coast of Scotland, located between Golspie and Dornoch. It forms the estuary of the River Fleet, a small spate river that rises in the hills east of Lairg. The loch was designated a National Nature Reserve (NNR) in 1998, and is managed by a partnership between NatureScot, the Scottish Wildlife Trust (SWT) and Sutherland Estates. The NNR extends to 1058 hectares, including the Loch Fleet tidal basin, sand dunes, shingle ridges and the adjacent pine woods, including Balbair Wood and Ferry Wood. The tidal basin of the loch covers over 630 ha, and forms the largest habitat on the NNR.

== Geography and geology ==
Loch Fleet is a shallow, bar-built estuary with extensive sand-flats and mud-flats backed by saltmarsh and sand dunes. The loch connects to the Dornoch Firth via a narrow channel between Coul Links and Ferry Links.

Beneath the sand dunes lies a bedrock of old Red Sandstone, overlain by shingle ridges, which extend from the western NNR boundary to the current coastline and north from Littleferry to Golspie. At the end of the last ice age Loch Fleet became a was a wide-open bay with a tidal delta reaching inland as far as Rogart. The current gradually dragged shingle across the entrance of the bay, producing a tidal basin linked to the sea by a narrow tidal channel.

== Flora and fauna ==
The mudflats are an important habitat for many bird species, and over 100 species have been recorded at the reserve, with the highest numbers seen during the spring and autumn migrations. Species that spend the winter at the loch include bar-tailed godwit, greylag goose, wigeon, curlew, dunlin, and teal. Approximately 2% of the entire UK population of greylag geese use the wider Dornoch Firth and Loch Fleet SPA, with Loch Fleet being particularly important during the autumn: as winter progresses many of the geese move on to the Dornoch Firth. The geese spend summers further north, with some heading for Iceland and some remaining within Scotland at sites in Caithness and Sutherland.

Breeding birds at Loch Fleet include Arctic terns, common terns, oystercatchers, ringed plovers, wheatears, European stonechats, cuckoos, meadow pipits and skylarks, these species tending to favour the links habitat. The pinewoods hold species including crossbills, siskin, common redstart, treecreeper, great spotted woodpecker, buzzard and sparrowhawk. Loch Fleet is a good place to see osprey fishing, and in the early 1990s there were 10 breeding pairs on the wider SPA.

The most visible mammals at Loch Fleet are seals: harbour seals can be seen from the public road at Skelbo year round, and grey seals visit during the winter months. Eurasian otter and pipistrelle bats are also found here, along with other typical Scottish land mammals such as roe deer, red fox, pine marten, and weasel. Red squirrels and Scottish wildcats have been recorded in the area, but have not been seen in recent years. In 2023 a humpback whale was washed ashore at Loch Fleet.

There are 265 species of vascular plants, over 110 species of lichen, and over 50 species of fungi have been recorded at the Loch Fleet NNR. The most noteworthy flora is that of the pinewood at Balblair Wood, where the nationally important species one-flowered wintergreen, twinflower and creeping lady's-tresses can be found. Other species typically found in native pine forests but otherwise uncommon in Scotland such as common wintergreen and lesser twayblade are also found here. The alder woods around the mouth of the river at the Mound are also significant.

== History ==
The ruins of Skelbo Castle are situated on the south side of the loch.

The Battle of Littleferry was fought a few days before the Battle of Culloden in 1746. The Sutherland militia came down from the hills above Golspie and fell upon around 500 men led by the Earl of Cromarty. Cromarty's men were cornered in the Littleferry peninsula on the northeast side of the loch, and were either killed, captured, or drowned in the loch.

The building of the Mound causeway, designed by Thomas Telford and built between 1814 and 1818 to carry what is now the A9 roadArticle stub box, reduced the size of the loch. The causeway, which is nearly 1 km long, acts as a tidal barrier, stopping the sea some 2.5 km short of the former tidal limit. Sluices in the causeway allow salmon and sea-trout to continue to migrate upstream to spawning areas, as well providing an outflow for the River Fleet.

== Conservation designations ==
Loch Fleet became a nature reserve under the management of the Scottish Wildlife Trust in 1970 by agreement with the landowners, Sutherland and Cambusmore Estates. In 1975 it was declared a Site of Special Scientific Interest (SSSI): the Loch Fleet SSSI is slightly larger than the NNR, at 1232 ha, and also covers Coul Links. On 24 March 1997, the Dornoch Firth and Loch Fleet Special Protection Area (SPA) was established for wildlife conservation. The SPA covers 7,836.33 hectares (19,364 acres) of Loch Fleet, the Dornoch Firth, Morrich More, the Mound Alderwoods and Tarbat Ness, and was also listed as a Ramsar site the same year. The Joint Nature Conservation Committee described it as "one of the best examples in northwest Europe of a large complex estuary which has been relatively unaffected by industrial development".

Loch Fleet was made a national nature reserve (NNR) in 1998: the NNR is classified as a Category IV protected area by the International Union for Conservation of Nature.
