= Littleferry =

Coordinates: 57.93411°N 4.01838°W

Littleferry: Scottish Gaelic: Am Port Beag
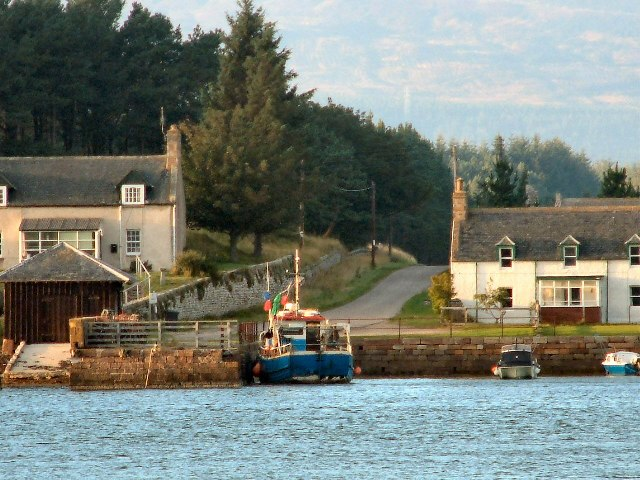
- Littleferry pier

- Location within the Sutherland area
- OS grid reference: NH805956
- Council area: Highland
- Lieutenancy area: Sutherland
- Country: Scotland
- Sovereign state: United Kingdom
- Post town: Golspie
- Postcode district: KW10 6
- Police: Scotland
- Fire: Scottish
- Ambulance: Scottish

Littleferry (Scottish Gaelic: Am Port Beag) is a village on the north east shore of Loch Fleet in Golspie, Sutherland, and is in the Scottish council area of Highland. Littleferry lies at the entrance to Loch Fleet, 3 miles (5 km) southwest of Golspie. Its name is derived from the ferry that once crossed the narrow channel here.

The Battle of Littleferry was a skirmish between a Jacobite force of the George Mackenzie, 3rd Earl of Cromartie and government troops under Ensign John Mackay of Golspie on the eve of the Battle of Culloden in 1746.
