= Dornoch Cathedral =

Coordinates: 57°52′52.06″N 4°1′46.64″W

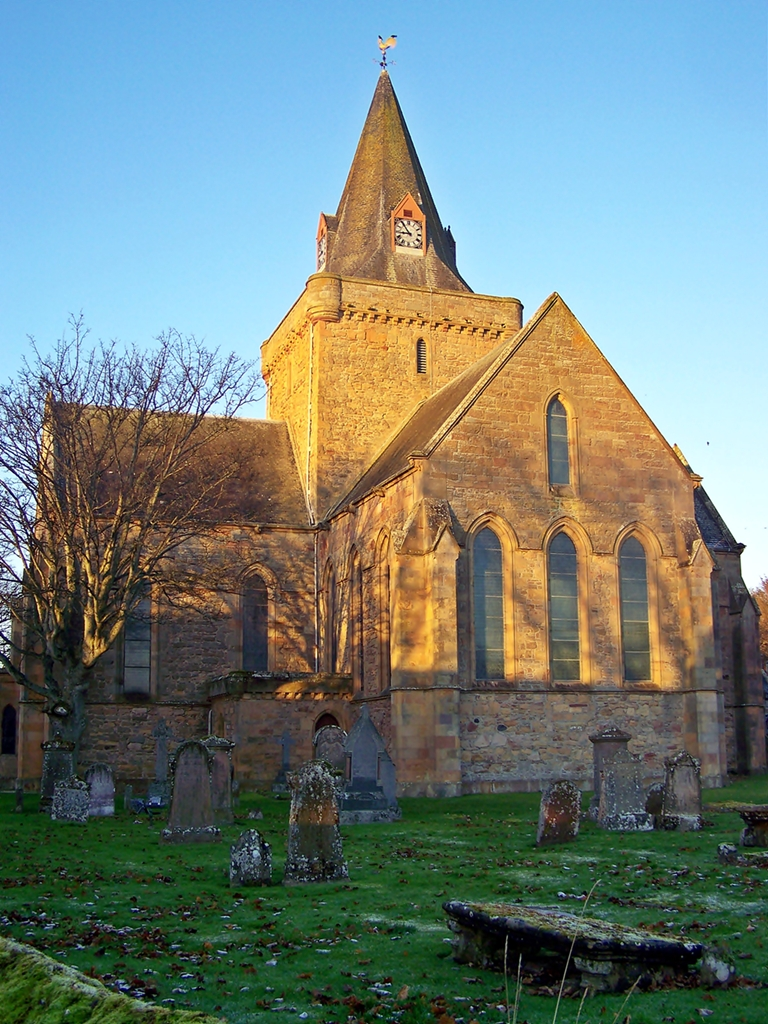
- Dornoch Cathedral

- Location within Sutherland
- Location: Dornoch
- Country: Scotland
- Denomination: Church of Scotland
- Previous denomination: Roman Catholic
- Website: www.dornoch-cathedral.com

History
- Founded: 1224
- Founder: Gilbert Murray
- Dedication: St Mary and St Gilbert

Architecture
- Heritage designation: Category A listed
- Designated: 18 March 1971

Administration
- Parish: Dornoch

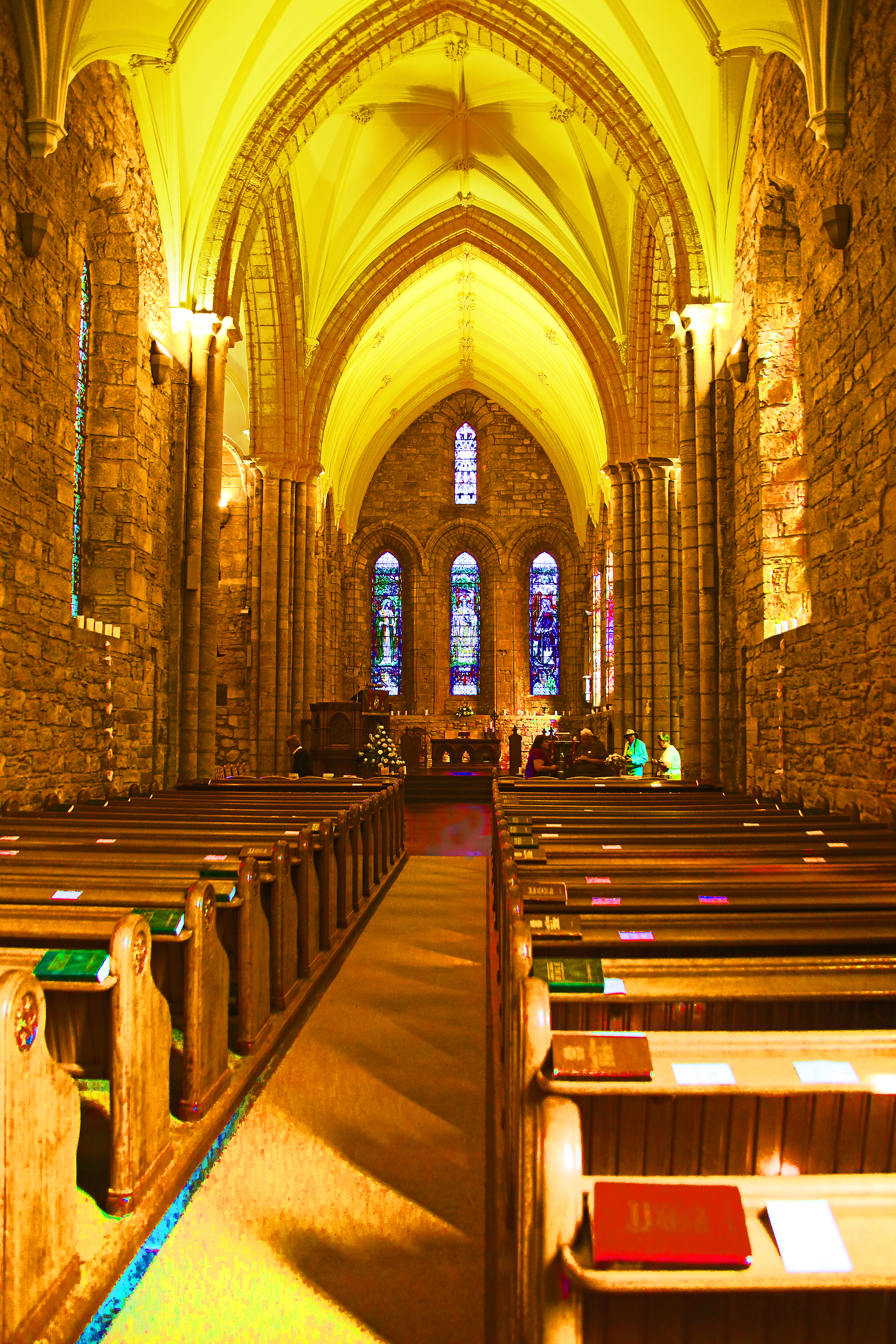
Cathedral interior

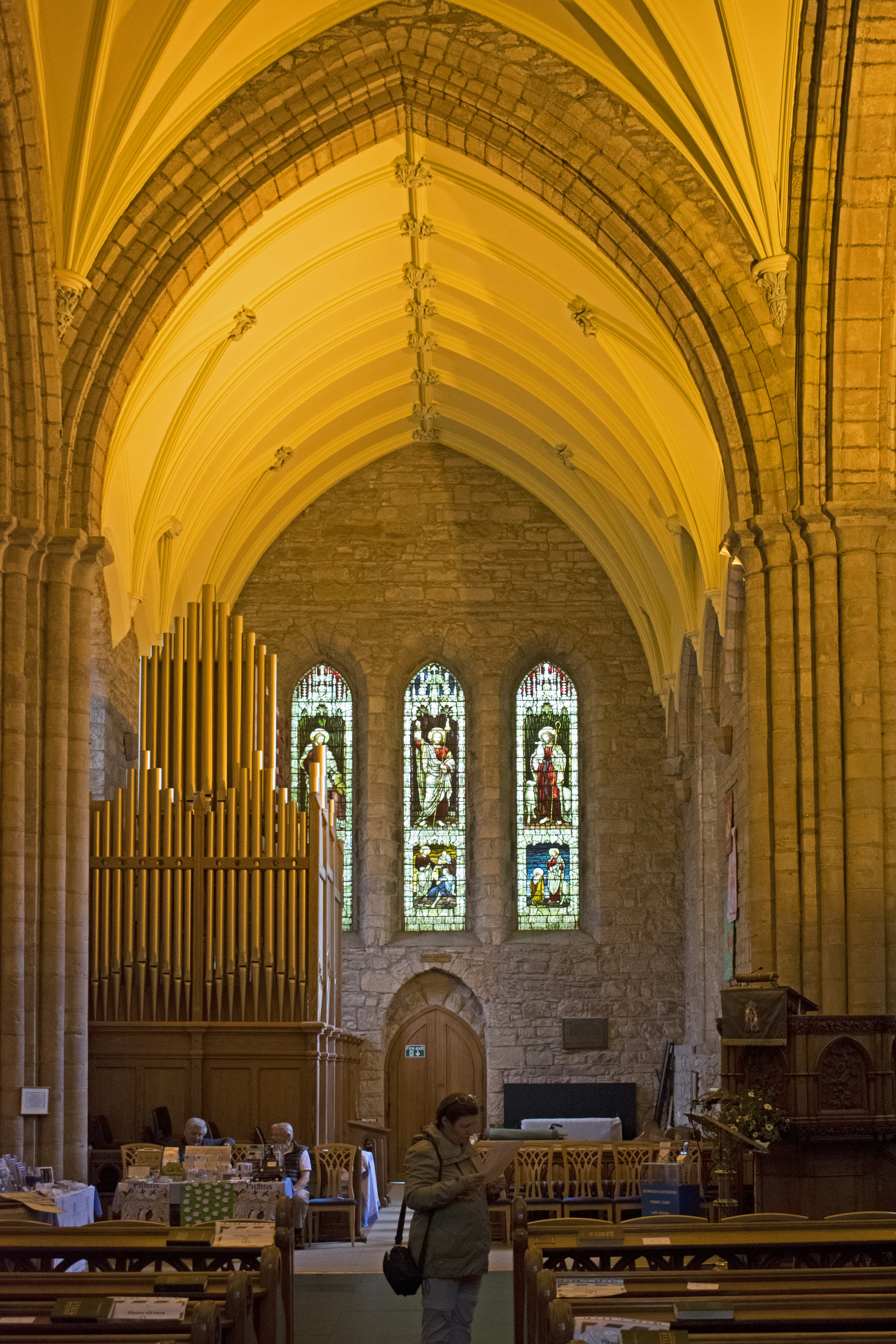
The north wing and the organ

Dornoch Cathedral is a Church of Scotland parish church serving the small Sutherland town of Dornoch, in the Scottish Highlands. Despite its name, the church is no longer a cathedral as it is a church of the Church of Scotland but retains the name due to being, historically, the seat of the Bishop of Caithness.The cathedral's churchyard is adjoined by Dornoch Castle, the somewhat reconstructed remains of the medieval palace of the Bishops of Caithness. It was formerly a Catholic cathedral.

== History ==
The cathedral was dedicated to its founder, St. Gilbert and was built in 1224, in the reign of King Alexander II (1214–49) and the episcopate of Gilbert de Moravia (died 1245) (later Saint Gilbert of Dornoch) as the cathedral church of the diocese of Caithness (moved to Dornoch from Halkirk). William de Moravia (later Sutherland), 1st Earl of Sutherland, was buried in the cathedral in 1248.

In 1570, the cathedral was burnt down by the Mackays of Strathnaver during local feuding. Full renovations were not carried out until 1835–37, by the architect William Burn, funded by Elizabeth the Countess of Sutherland at a cost of £15,000 (equivalent to £1,450,000 in 2025). Among the renovations carried out, the ruined but still largely intact aisled medieval nave was demolished and a new narrow nave without pillars built on its site. In the 17th century, Dornoch ceased to be the seat of the Bishops of Caithness due to the abolition of the episcopate in the Church of Scotland, but the name has remained due to this historical association.

On 30 September 1866, the Duke and Duchess of Sutherland were present to welcome the Prince and Princess of Wales, and the Duke of Edinburgh, who attended the morning service.

The interior was reordered between 1924 and 1926 by Rev. Charles Donald Bentinck, with the removal of Victorian plasterwork to reveal the stonework (although the medieval church would have been plastered throughout). The site of the medieval high altar was raised and converted into a burial area for the Sutherland family, who introduced large marble memorials.

The previous minister was the Very Rev Dr James Simpson, who was Moderator of the General Assembly of the Church of Scotland in 1994. As of May 2018, the minister (since 1998) was the Rev Susan Brown. On 9 October 2017, it was announced that she had been nominated as the next Moderator of the General Assembly of the Church of Scotland. She took up the position in May 2018 and served for a year.

== Burials ==
- Adam of Melrose - body moved here from the church of Skinnet in 1239
- William de Moravia, 1st Earl of Sutherland, was buried in the cathedral in 1248.
- Saint Gilbert of Dornoch - founder of Dornoch Cathedral
- Richard de Moravia, was buried in the cathedral after he was killed during the Battle of Embo in 1245.
- George Leveson-Gower, 1st Duke of Sutherland
- Elizabeth Leveson-Gower, Duchess of Sutherland

== Organ ==
The first organ was built by Eustace Ingram and given by Andrew Carnegie and installed in 1893 and opened in January 1894. It was the first organ installed in the county of Sutherland. It was enlarged and hydraulic power introduced in 1909 at a cost of £200 given by Andrew Carnegie. A specification of the organ can be found on the National Pipe Organ Register.

== Gallery ==
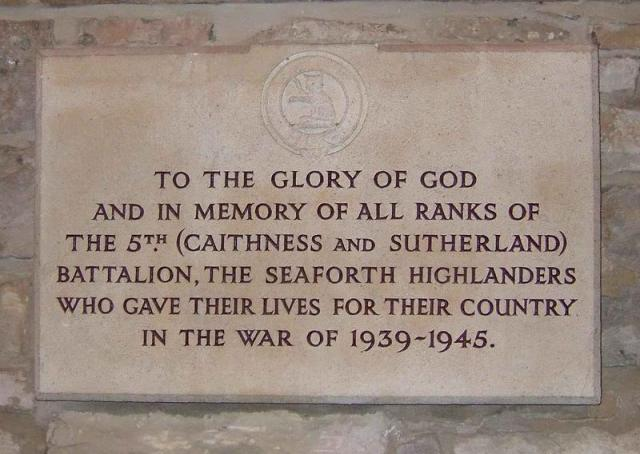
Plaque commemorating the 5th Bn Seaforth Highlanders in World War II.

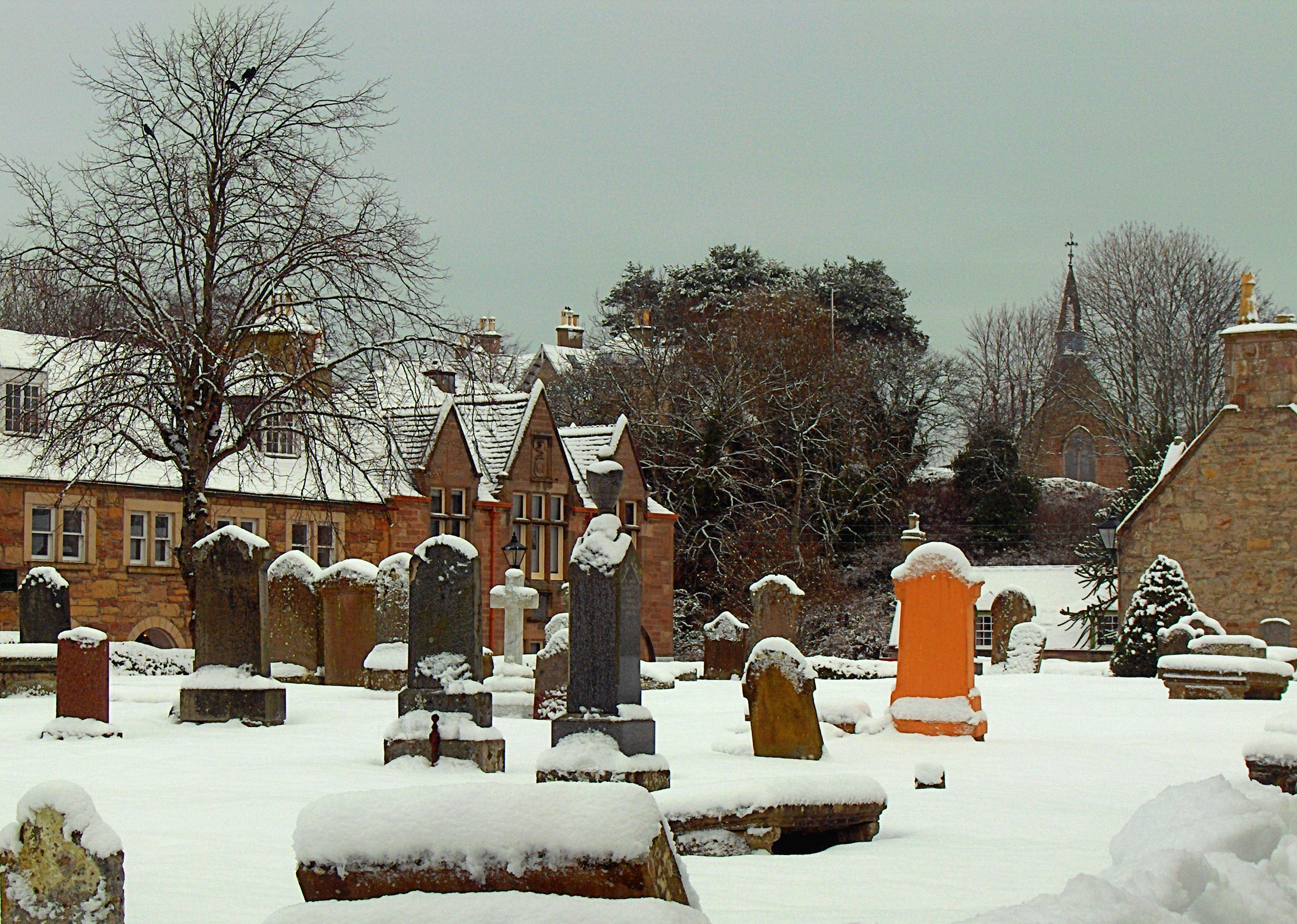
Dornoch Cathedral cemetery

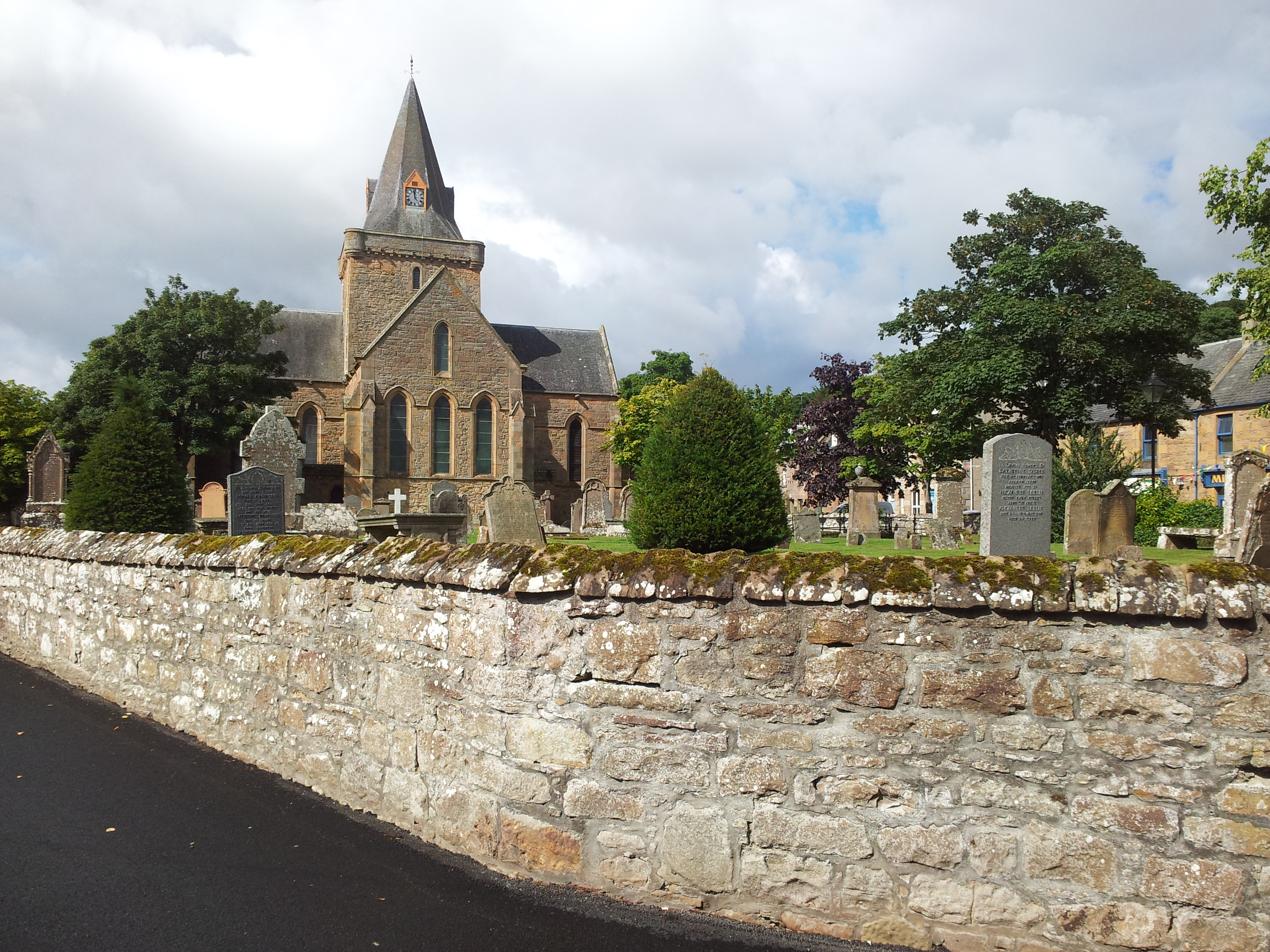
Dornoch Cathedral

== See also ==
- List of Church of Scotland parishes
