= Culbin House =

Former Scottish manor house

- Culbin Sands, Moray, Scotland

Site information
- Condition: No remains above ground

Location
- Coordinates: 57°37′39″N 3°41′34″W

Site history
- In use: until late 17th century

Culbin House was a manor house, in the Culbin Sands, near Forres, Moray in Scotland. The house was the caput of the feudal barony of Culbin.

== History ==
The estate was once the home of Richard de Moravia, ancestor of the Murrays of Culbin, who settled in the area during the late 12th century. The estate passed by marriage of the heiress Gyles Murray to Thomas Kinnaird, in the 15th century. The last laird, Alexander Kinnaird, abandoned the estate in 1694, due to sand dunes burying the farmland and finally the house. The remains of the house are located under sand dunes.
