= Gilbert de Moravia =

Bishop of Caithness

Saint Gilbert of Dornoch
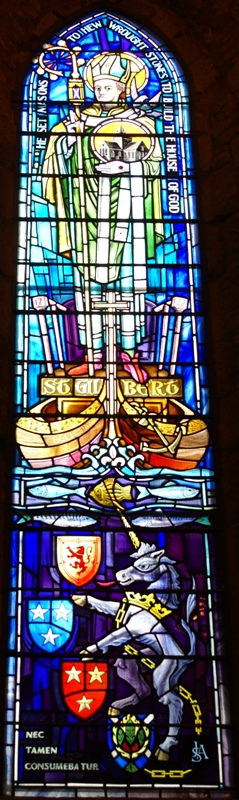
- Stained glass of St Gilbert from Dornoch Cathedral, Scotland.

Bishop
- Born: unknown Moray
- Died: 1245
- Feast: 1 April
- Patronage: Diocese of Dornoch

Gilbert de Moravia (died 1245), later known as Saint Gilbert of Dornoch, or Gilbert of Caithness, was the most famous Bishop of Caithness and founder of Dornoch Cathedral. His name may suggest that he came from the semi-Gaelicized family of Flemish origin who were Lords of Duffus, and who during Gilbert's episcopate would create the Earldom of Sutherland under Gilbert's possible cousin, William de Moravia, 1st Earl of Sutherland.

== Life ==
It is known that Gilbert was the son of one Muiredach, son of Alexander de Moravia ("of Moray", thus indicating the ancestral home and not necessarily a family name). If Gilbert was of purely Gaelic origin, his name may be a Francization of the Gaelic name Gille Brigte (modern: Gillebrìghde). Gilbert allegedly had a younger brother, Richard de Moravia, who was killed fighting against Scandinavians and whose effigy-sarcophagus currently resides in the cathedral. He is also known to have had an older brother John, and a younger brother, Simon.

As his name indicates, Gilbert very likely came from Moray. The family owned extensive lands in Duffus and Strabok. Gilbert was for a long time the Archdeacon of the Bishopric of Moray; it is probable that Gilbert was elected to the see sometime in the year 1223, in the presence of King Alexander II of Scotland and his army. He was certainly bishop of Caithness by the summer of 1224. King Alexander probably decided that, after the murder of Gilbert's predecessor Adam of Melrose, the bishopric's seat (cathedra) should be moved closer to royal protection. So it was that Gilbert's episcopate saw the move of the bishopric from Halkirk in the far north of the diocese to Dornoch in the far south. It was to the new cathedral that, in 1239, Gilbert would move Bishop Adam's body. Gilbert nevertheless continued to reside for much of his episcopate in the more violent north, and maintained a palace at Scrabster.

== Achievements and death ==
Gilbert's achievements include the building of the cathedral at Dornoch, and the establishment of several hospices for the poor. He became known as a fine preacher, and he did much work to civilise his diocese. Gilbert also translated the Psalms and the New Testament Gospels into Gaelic.

Gilbert died in his palace at Scrabster in 1245, traditionally on 1 April. The latter day is his feast day. He was buried at Dornoch, and his relics were venerated until the Reformation, oaths being sworn on them at least until 1545. He is the last Scottish saint to appear in the Calendar of Saints, although it is not known if he was ever formally canonized.

Folklore surrounding St Gilbert was collected in Sutherlandshire in the late nineteenth century, including a legend of how he overcame a dragon—or salamander—that was terrorising the country.

== See also ==
- List of Catholic saints
- Bishop of Caithness

== Sources ==
- Dowden, John, The Bishops of Scotland, ed. J. Maitland Thomson, (Glasgow, 1912)
- Ross-Harper, Ian, Notable Bishops and Ministers of Dornoch Cathedral, (Historylinks Museum, Dornoch)

Preceded by Adam	Bishop of Caithness; 1222x1224-1245	Succeeded by William
