= Dunrobin (locomotive) =

Dunrobin (1st)
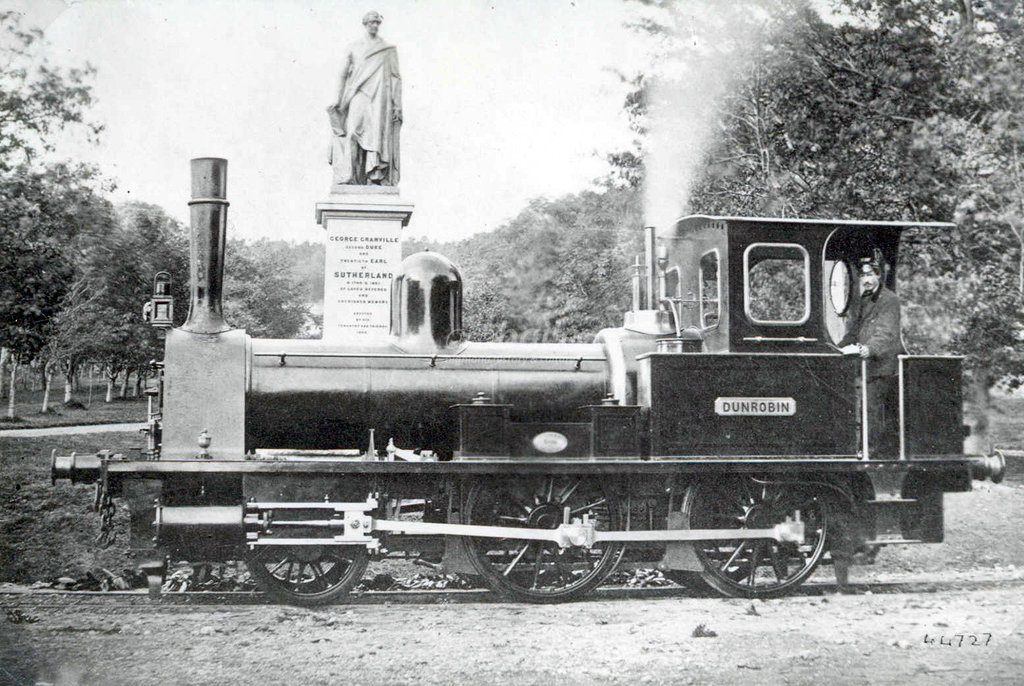
- Dunrobin in front of the memorial to the 2nd Duke of Sutherland at Dunrobin Station
Type and origin
- Power type: Steam
- Builder: Kitson and Company
- Total produced: 1
Specifications
- Configuration
  - Whyte: 2-4-0T
  - UIC: 1B n2t
- Gauge: 1,435 mm (4 ft 8 1/2 in)
- Driver dia.: 4 ft 0 in (1,219 mm)
- Loco weight: 21 long tons (21 t)
- Cylinders: Two, outside
- Cylinder size: 10 in × 18 in (254 mm × 457 mm)
Career
- Operators: 3rd Duke of Sutherland; Highland Railway
- Numbers: HR: 118
- Disposition: Scrapped

The name Dunrobin was given to two Scottish steam locomotives.

== The First Dunrobin ==
The 3rd Duke of Sutherland purchased a small 2-4-0T from Kitson and Company for the opening of the Duke of Sutherland's Railway in November 1870 and the locomotive was used to pull the two daily passenger trains on the line. When the Duke of Sutherland's Railway reached Golspie in June 1871, the railway operations were transferred to the Highland Railway and the locomotive was used exclusively for the Duke of Sutherland's private train. Named Dunrobin, it had 4-foot-0-inch (1.219 m) driving wheels, 10 by 18 in (254 by 457 mm) outside cylinders, and weighed 21 tons in working order. On his succession, the 4th Duke decided to have a new locomotive built, and the original Dunrobin was sold to the Highland Railway in 1895. It was rebuilt in 1896 with a larger boiler and cylinders. The Highland Railway numbered it 118 and named it Gordon Castle for use on the Fochabers branch. Later it was renamed Invergordon and used as a shunter in that town, where it survived until just after the Grouping.

== The Second Dunrobin ==
Dunrobin (2nd)
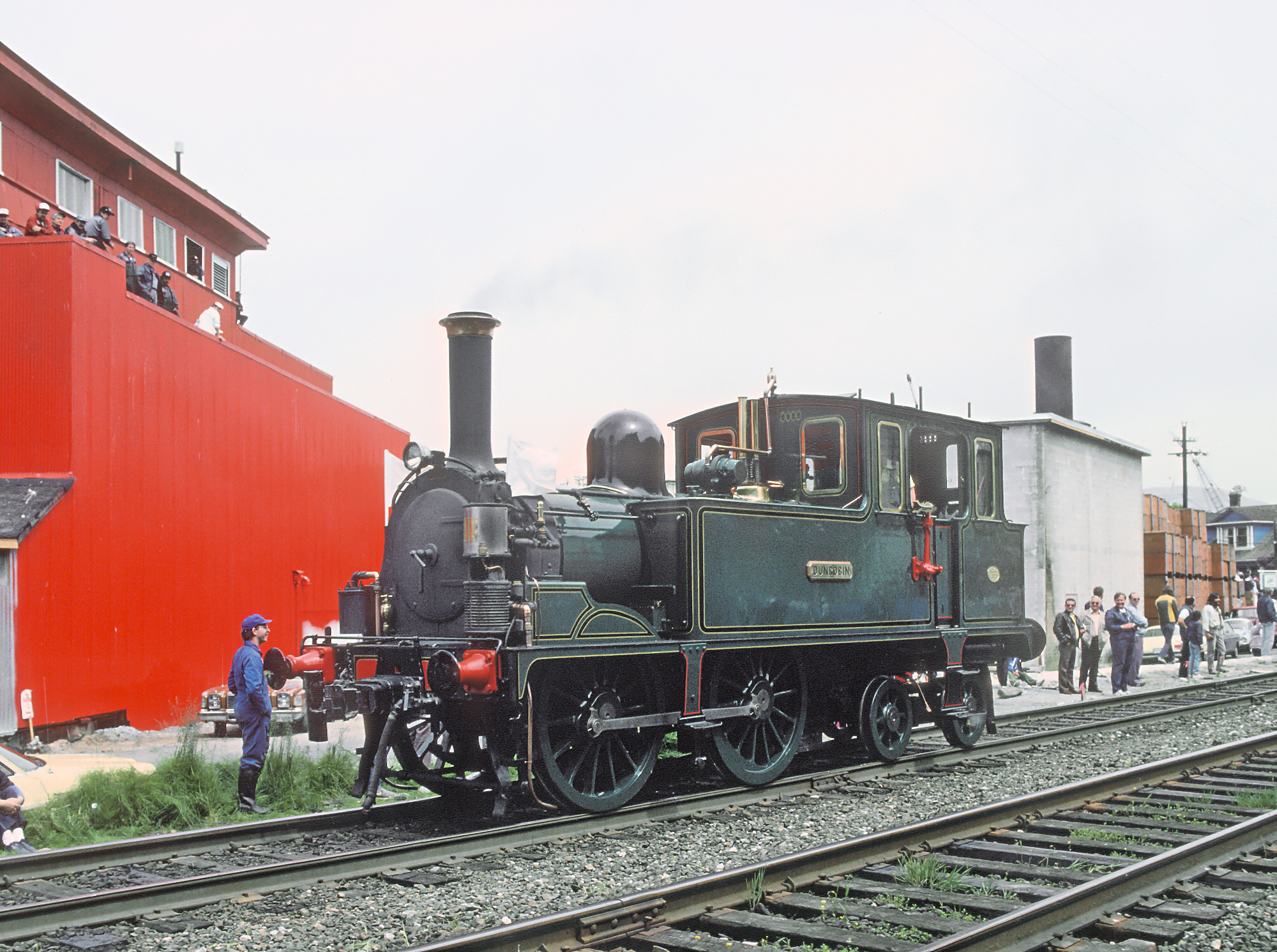
- Dunrobin at the Expo86, Vancouver, British Columbia in May 1986
Type and origin
- Power type: Steam
- Builder: Sharp, Stewart & Co.
- Serial number: 4085
Specifications
- Configuration
  - Whyte: 0-4-4T
  - UIC: B2′ n2t
- Gauge: 1,435 mm (4 ft 8 1/2 in)
- Driver dia.: 4 ft 6 in (1,372 mm)
- Trailing dia.: 2 ft 6 in (762 mm)
- Loco weight: 31.5 long tons; 35.3 short tons (32.0 t)
- Fuel type: Coal
- Fuel capacity: 0.79 long tons; 0.88 short tons (0.8 t)
- Water cap.: 690 imp gal; 830 US gal (3,130 L)
- Firebox
  - Grate area: 10.0 sq ft (0.93 m^{2})
- Boiler pressure: 150 psi (1.03 MPa)
- Heating surface
  - Firebox: 57 sq ft (5.3 m^{2})
  - Flues: 517 sq ft (48.0 m^{2})
- Cylinders: Two, inside
- Cylinder size: 13 in × 18 in (330 mm × 457 mm)
- Valve gear: Stephenson
Performance figures
- Tractive effort: 7,183 lbf (31.95 kN)
Career
- Operators: 4th Duke of Sutherland

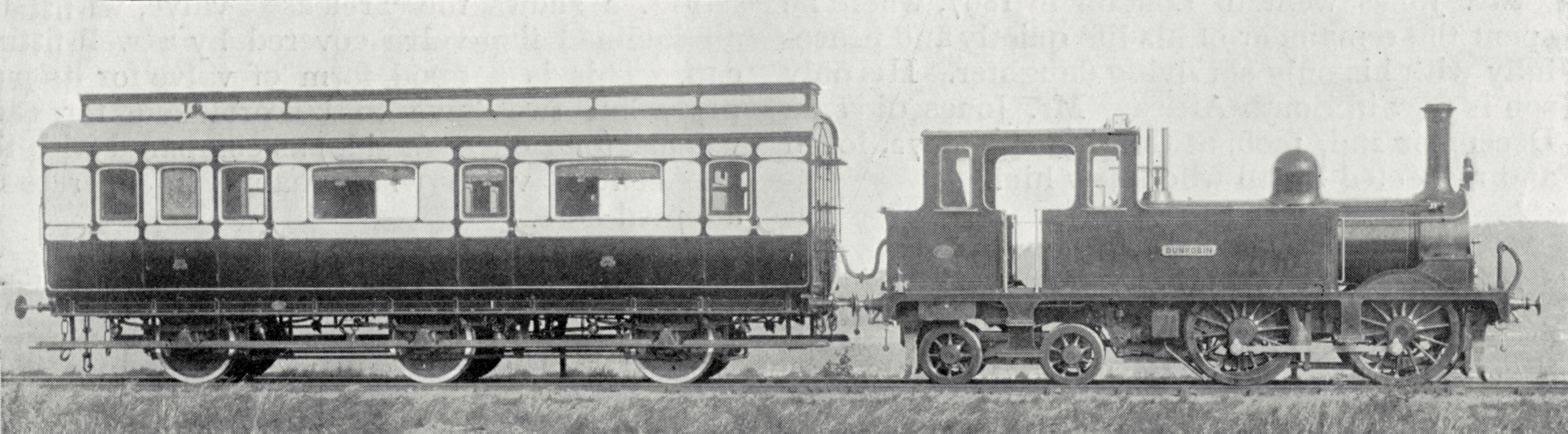
Dunrobin (2) and 1st private saloon of the Duke of Sutherland

The new Dunrobin was an 0-4-4T built by Sharp, Stewart & Co. (works no. 4085) in 1895 for the 4th Duke of Sutherland. It had 4-foot-6-inch (1.372 m) driving wheels and 13 by 18 in (330 by 457 mm) inside cylinders. The 3rd Duke of Sutherland had a private station built as a condition of financing the 17 1/2 miles (28.2 km) extension of the railway from Golspie to Helmsdale, which opened in 1871. A further condition was that he should have running rights for a locomotive between Dunrobin Castle and Inverness. The original Dunrobin was a 2-4-0T built by Kitson & Co., Leeds for the 3rd Duke of Sutherland. It was replaced in 1895 by the new locomotive. Two railway carriages were constructed, which Dunrobin hauled to Inverness and were then attached to Highland Railway trains to convey the Duke to his destination. The carriages were a bogie saloon and a four-wheel saloon.

=== Preservation ===
In 1949, the Scottish Region of British Railways revoked the Duke's running powers. He then sold the locomotive and coaches. The bogie saloon is now part of the National Railway Museum's collection. As of January 2011 it is under the care of the Scottish Railway Preservation Society at the Bo'ness and Kinneil Railway. Dunrobin and the four-wheel saloon were sold to Captain Howey and initially preserved as static exhibits at New Romney on the Romney, Hythe and Dymchurch Railway in Kent. Following Howey's death in 1963, the locomotive and carriage were sold to Harold Foster, who had them transported to Canada. Foster was declared bankrupt in 1965, and the locomotive and carriage were bought for $15,000 by the Government of British Columbia. They became exhibits at Fort Steele heritage village, where Dunrobin was steamed occasionally. It was last steamed at Fort Steele in 2005. In 2010, both were declared surplus to requirements.

It was announced in January 2011 that they had been bought by Beamish Museum, with the intention of restoring Dunrobin to working order. The locomotive and carriage arrived back in the United Kingdom on 16 May. Dunrobin was taken to Bridgnorth on the Severn Valley Railway, where restoration to working order is in progress. The carriage was taken to Beamish. The Highland Railway W Class were near-clones of Dunrobin.
