= Helmsdale railway station =

Railway station in Highland, Scotland

Helmsdale Scottish Gaelic: Bun Ilidh
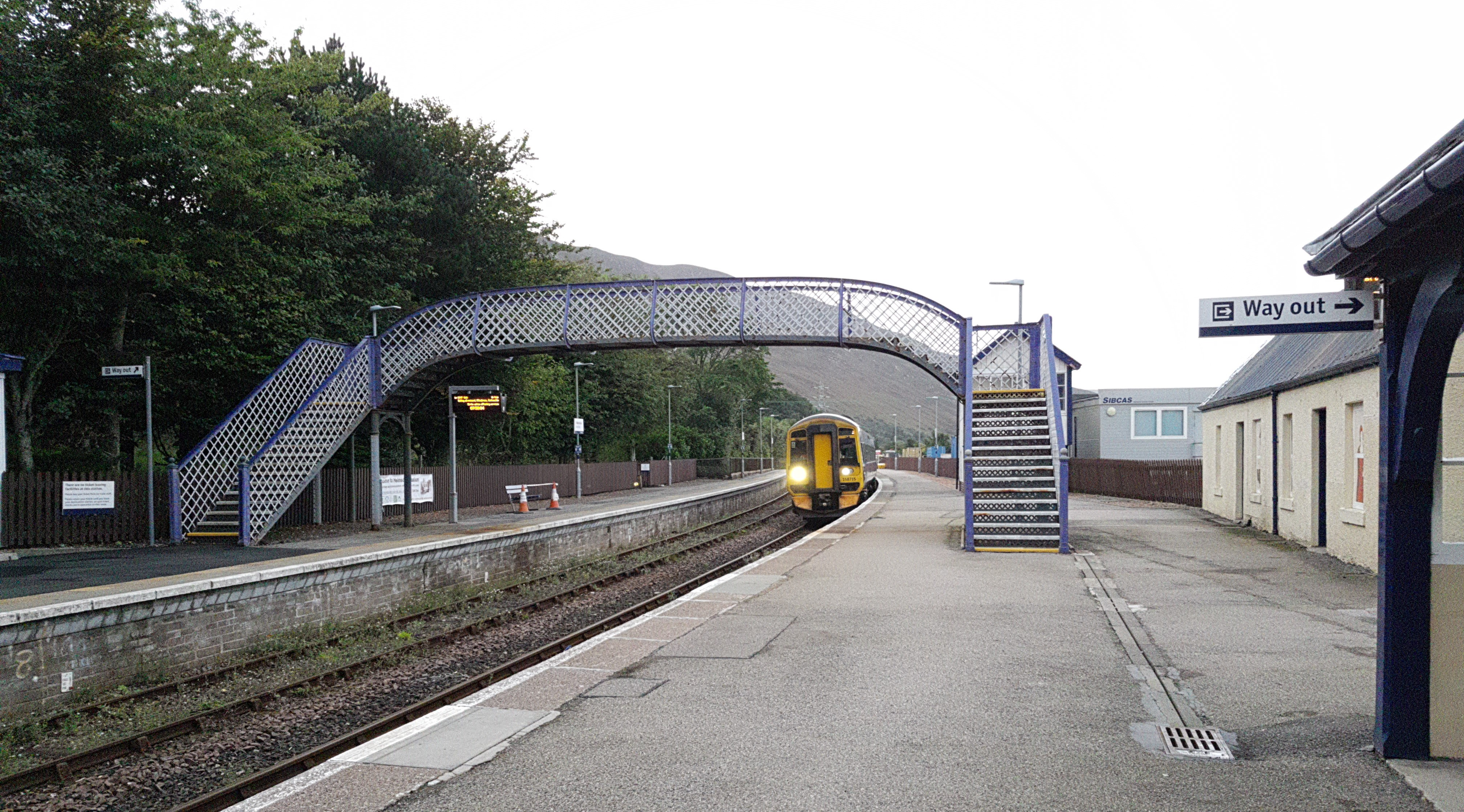
- 158715 approaching the station in 2021

General information
- Location: Helmsdale, Highland; Scotland
- Coordinates: 58.1177°N 3.6590°W
- Grid reference: ND023155
- Manager: ScotRail
- Platforms: 2

Other information
- Station code: HMS

History
- Original company: Duke of Sutherland's Railway
- Pre-grouping: Highland Railway
- Post-grouping: London, Midland and Scottish Railway; British Railways

Key dates
- 19 June 1871: Opened as terminus
- 28 July 1874: Altered to through station

Passengers
- 2021/22: ▲3,168
- 2022/23: ▲3,484
- 2023/24: ▲4,038
- 2024/25: ▲4,242
- 2025/26: ▼3,922

Listed Building – Category B
- Designated: 23 July 1987
- Reference no.: LB7184
Location
Notes
- Passenger statistics from the Office of Rail and Road

Helmsdale railway station is a railway station serving the village of Helmsdale in the Highland council area, northern Scotland. It is located on the Far North Line, between Brora and Kildonan, 101 miles 40 chains (163.3 km) from Inverness. ScotRail, who manage the station, operate all services.

== History ==
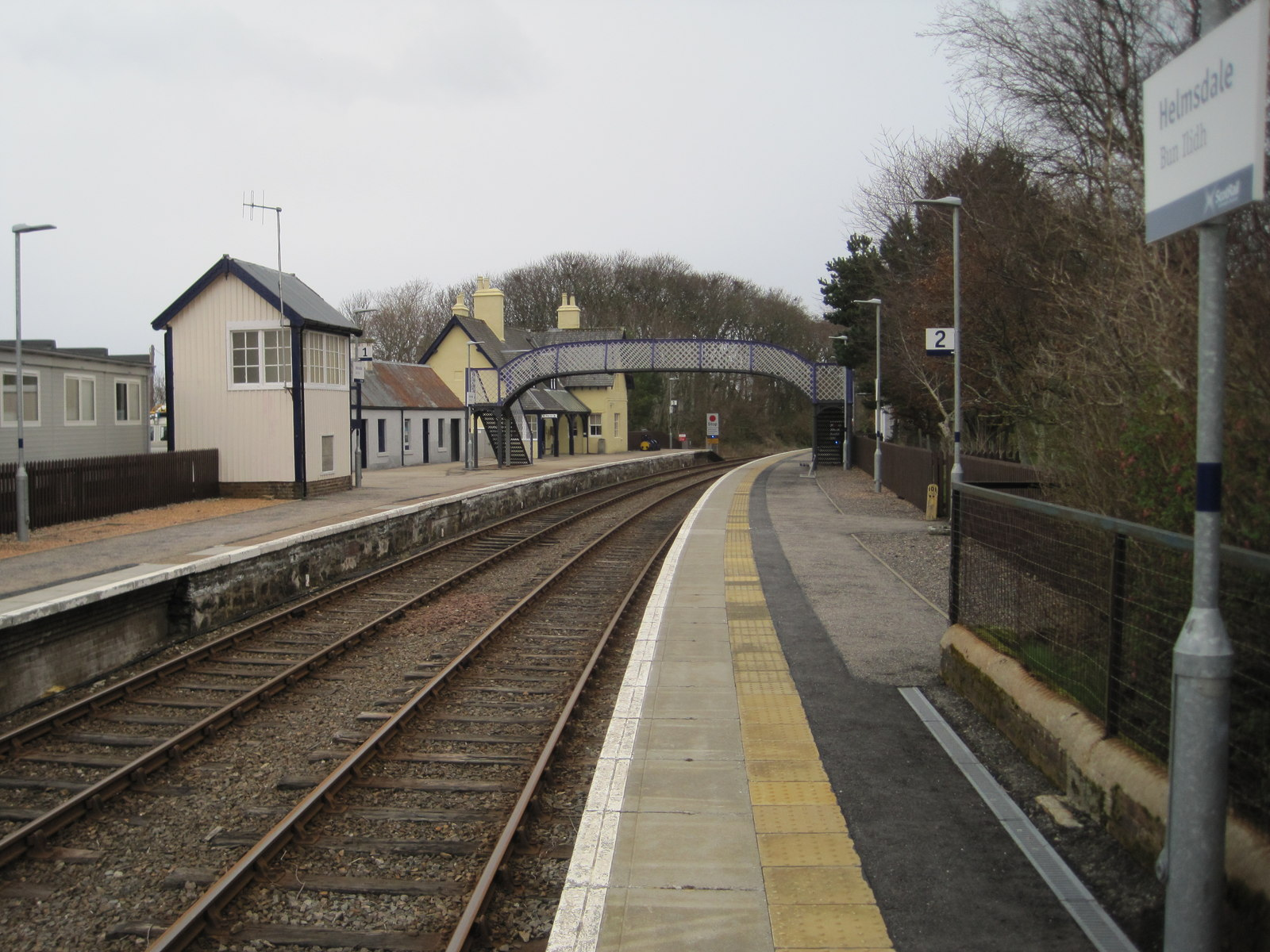
Looking south from Helmsdale in 2015

The Duke of Sutherland's Railway had opened between Dunrobin and West Helmsdale (near Gartymore) on 1 November 1870. Extensions of this line southward to Golspie and northward to Helmsdale were opened on 19 June 1871. The station buildings were designed by the architect William Fowler.

Another company, the Sutherland and Caithness Railway (S&CR), was authorised on 13 July 1871 to take over the powers of the projected Caithness Railway and link Helmsdale with that line at Georgemas Junction, and the S&CR opened on 28 July 1874.

The station master's house on the platform was abandoned in the 1980s. In 2013 it was refitted as self-catering holiday accommodation.

On 7 August 2024, King Charles III visited Helmsdale Railway Station to mark the 150th anniversary of the Sutherland and Caithness railway line. The King, met railway workers, representatives of Helmsdale Community Council and members of Sutherland Schools Pipe Band. He afterwards laid flowers at Helmsdale War Memorial to mark its Centenary and met veterans and members of the local community.

=== Accidents and incidents ===
On 29 April 1891 there was a collision between a down mixed train from Inverness which ran into an engine which had arrived earlier. Major Marindin of the Board of Trade investigated and found that the driver Robert Lindsay deliberately ignored the signals as he would have had difficulty in restarting the train on the rising gradient of 1 in 59.

== Facilities ==
Both platforms have waiting areas and benches, whilst platform 2 also has a help point. Bike racks and a car park are adjacent to platform 2. There is step free access to platform 2 only; platform 1 can only be accessed via the footbridge.

== Passenger volume ==
Passenger Volume at Helmsdale
	2004–05	2005–06	2006–07	2007–08	2008–09	2009–10	2010–11	2011–12	2012–13	2013–14	2014–15	2015–16	2016–17	2017–18	2018–19	2019–20	2020–21	2021–22	2022–23	2023–24	2024–25
Entries and exits	3,513	3,514	4,456	5,348	5,646	5,680	5,656	6,086	5,828	5,778	5,096	6,204	5,768	4,636	5,044	5,086	564	3,168	3,484	4,038	4,242

The statistics cover twelve month periods that start in April.

== Services ==
Mondays to Saturdays, there are four train each way that call here - southbound to Dingwall & Inverness and northbound to Wick via Thurso. Sundays see a single departure each way.

Preceding station	National Rail	Following station
Brora	ScotRail; Far North Line	Kildonan
	Historical railways	
West Helmsdale; Line open, station closed	Highland Railway; Duke of Sutherland's Railway; Sutherland and Caithness Railway	Salzcraggie Platform; Line open, station closed
