= Dunrobin =

Dunrobin may refer to:

== Australia ==
- Dunrobin, Queensland, a locality in the Barcaldine Region, Queensland
- Dunrobin, Victoria

== Canada ==
- Dunrobin, Ontario, Canada

== United Kingdom ==
- Dunrobin Castle, Scotland
  - Dunrobin Castle railway station
  - Dunrobin (locomotive)
