= Backies Broch =

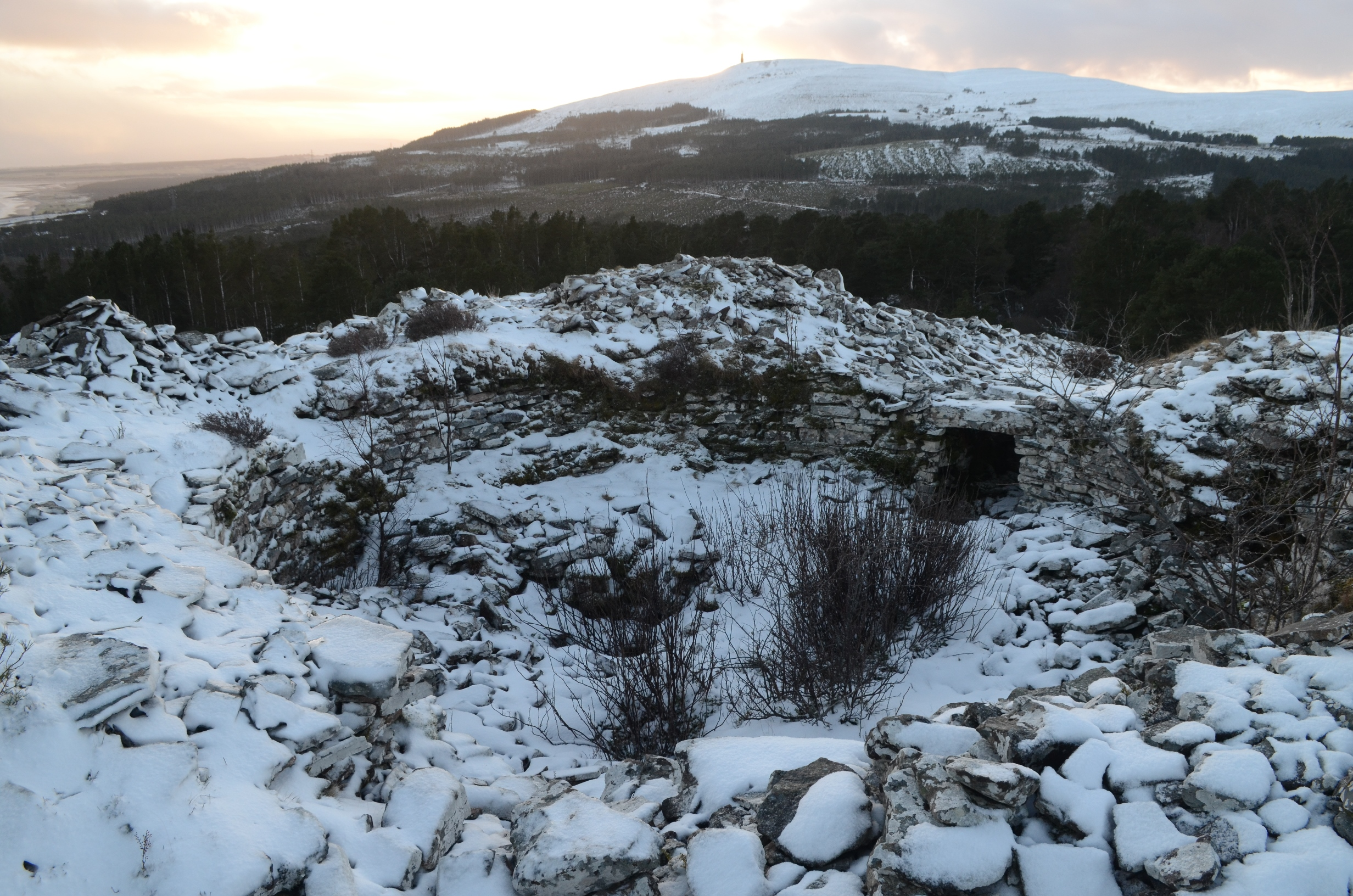
- Backies Broch in the snow, with Ben Bhraggie visible in the background

- Location within Highland
- 57.9974302°N 3.9759561°W
- Type: Broch
- Periods: Iron Age
- Location: Scottish Highlands

Site notes
- Owner: Historic Environment Scotland

Backies Broch is an Iron Age broch in Sutherland, Scotland, roughly 1.6 miles (2.6 km) north of Golspie.

== Name ==
The broch takes its name from the much smaller crofting settlement, Backies, which sits on the hillside below it.

Backies likely derives from the Old Norse bakki, meaning "bank" or "edge".

== Description ==
Historic Environment Scotland describe Backies Broch as a "complex stone-built substantial roundhouse, dating from the Iron Age". The broch sits on a prominent knoll overlooking the valley formed by the Golspie Burn, 180 metres (590 ft) above sea level.

Backies Broch has a total diameter of 18.25 metres (59.9 ft). Its stone walls measure up to 5 metres (16 ft) thick, creating an interior space roughly 8.25 metres (27.1 ft) in diameter.

At one point, the broch would have had multiple storeys, reached by an intramural stair that was still intact entering the 20th century.

Beyond the broch are traces of a large outer wall, alongside several outbuildings.

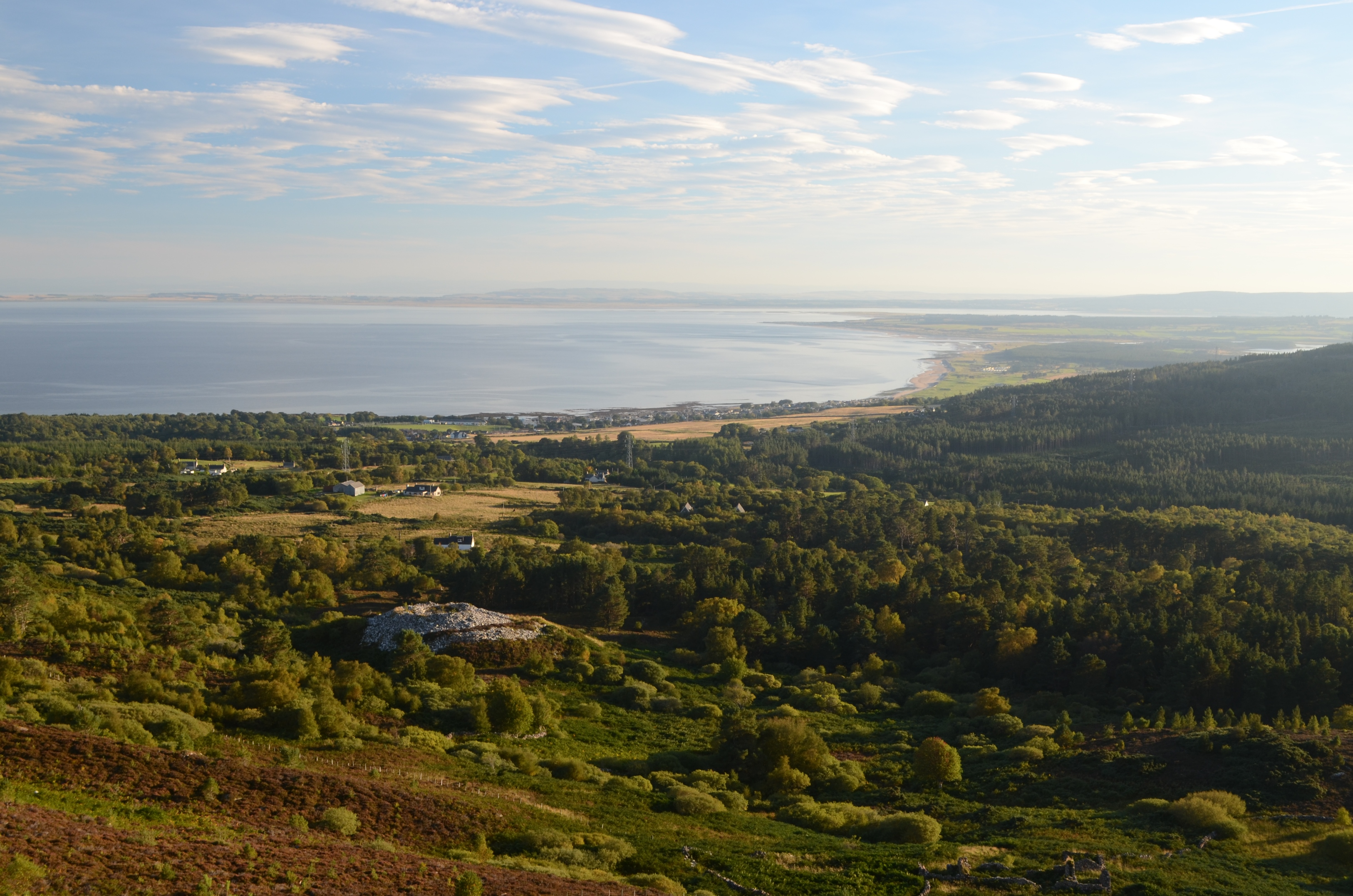
Backies Broch from the north, overlooking the North Sea

== Excavation and scheduling ==
Backies Broch, along with nearby Carn Liath, was first excavated in the mid-19th century under the orders of the Duke of Sutherland. Unfortunately, much of its construction appears to have been damaged during the excavation process.

The broch was not listed as a scheduled monument until 1939. While its relative remoteness has protected it from overtourism, it has also made it harder to preserve, compared to the much more accessible Carn Liath.
