= John James Joass =

Scottish architect

John James Joass (1868 – 10 May 1952) was a Scottish architect, born in Dingwall, Scotland. His father William Cumming Joass was an established architect in that town.

The son was given basic training with his father, and then in 1885 articled with John Burnet & Son in Glasgow, Scotland. In 1890 he moved to the firm of Robert Rowand Anderson, and then in 1893 to London, England. After a number of positions he joined John Belcher's practice in 1896. He became a partner in 1905, and continued the practice after the death of Belcher in 1913.

Between 1913 and 1914 the Mappin Terraces of London Zoo were built. Joass was the architect of this project to provide more naturalistic settings for animals at the London Zoo. The terraces with four artificial peaks, the Goat Hills, were innovative both in concept and construction, making use of concrete engineering techniques recently invented in America. In 1905, the partnership was working on the remodeling of a country house in Tapeley Park, in the village of Instow, Devon. This had started in 1898 and continued until 1916, so was presumably completed by Joass after his partner's death.

The partnership undertook the Royal Insurance office in Piccadilly, London in 1907–09. Joass was also joint architect of Whiteleys department store, which opened in 1911, and the re-building of the Swan and Edgar department store, after 1920.

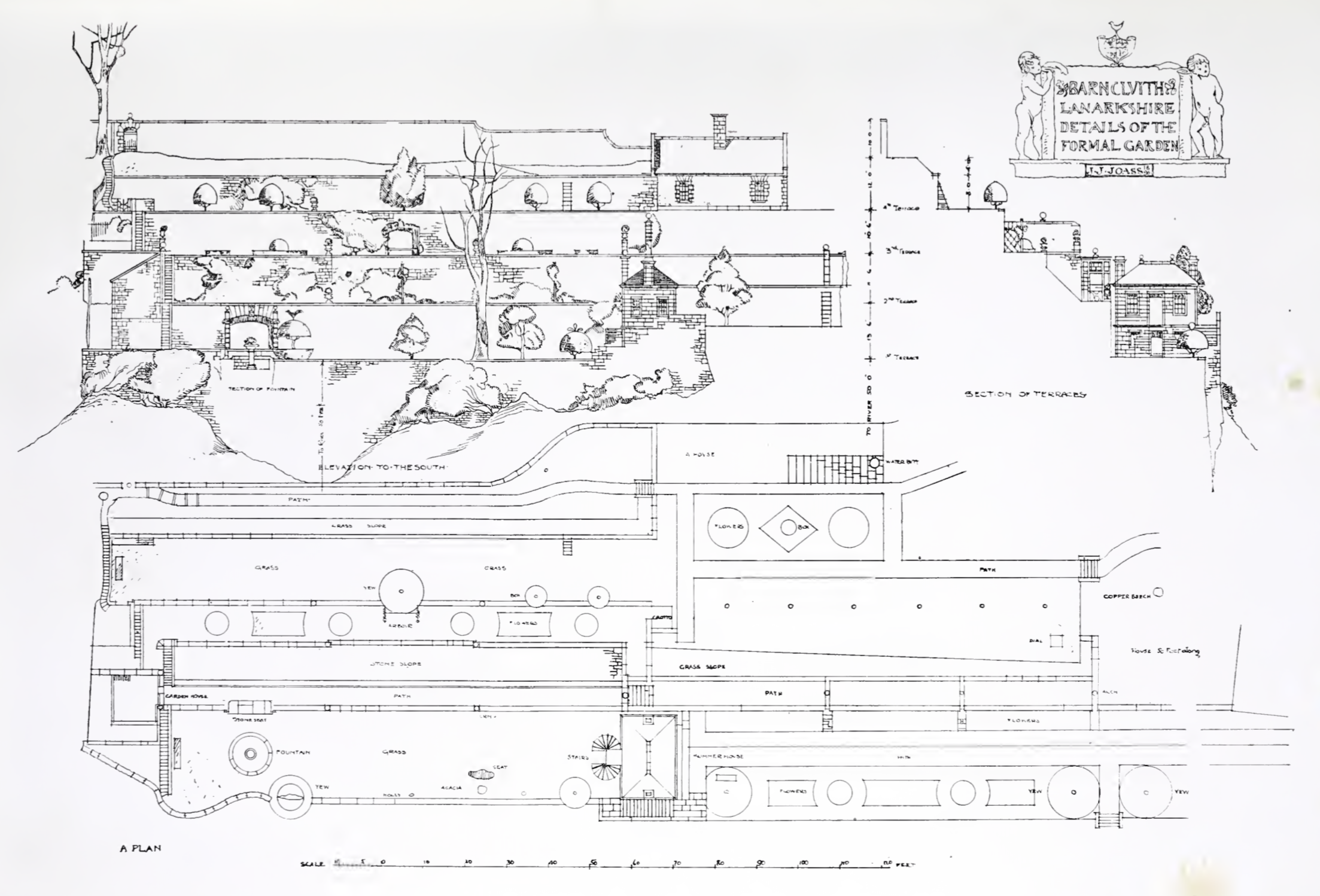

In 1926 Joass was commissioned to provide an extension to Chartered Accountants Hall, which had originally been designed by Belcher and constructed in the 1890s. Joass' extension provided an additional 5,000 square feet for meeting rooms and offices; the final cost of the extension came to £35,976 9s. 6d.

He retired to Poole, Dorset sometime after 1930. He was an avid sailor of small sailing craft.

== Family ==
His paternal uncle was the antiquarian and geologist Rev James Maxwell Joass, minister of Golspie.
