= Loth railway station =

Disused railway station in Lothbeg, Highland

Loth
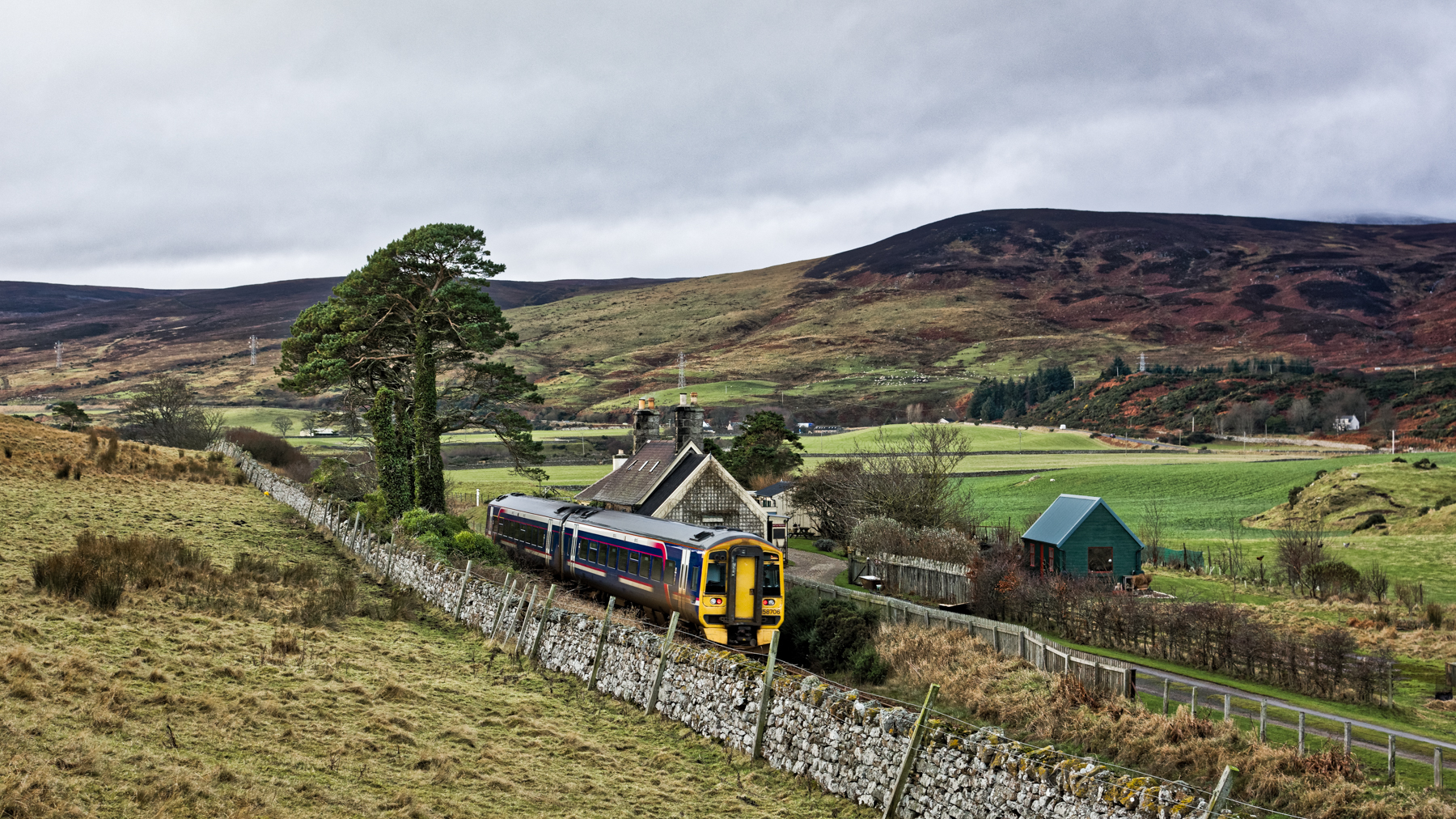

General information
- Location: Lothbeg, Sutherland; Scotland
- Coordinates: 58.0676°N 3.7686°W
- Grid reference: NC957100
- Platforms: 1

Other information
- Status: Disused

History
- Original company: Duke of Sutherland's Railway
- Pre-grouping: Highland Railway
- Post-grouping: London, Midland and Scottish Railway; British Railways (Scottish Region)

Key dates
- 19 June 1871: Opened
- 13 June 1960: Closed
Location

Loth railway station served the hamlet of Lothbeg, in the historical county of Sutherland, Scotland, from 1871 to 1960 on the Duke of Sutherland's Railway.

== History ==
The station was opened on 19 June 1871 by the Duke of Sutherland's Railway. It had a signal box and a goods yard to the south. The station closed on 13 June 1960.

| Preceding station | Historical railways | Following station |
|---|---|---|
| West Helmsdale; Line open, station closed | Duke of Sutherland's Railway | Brora; Line and station open |
