= Brora railway station =

Railway station in Highland, Scotland

Brora Scottish Gaelic: Brùra
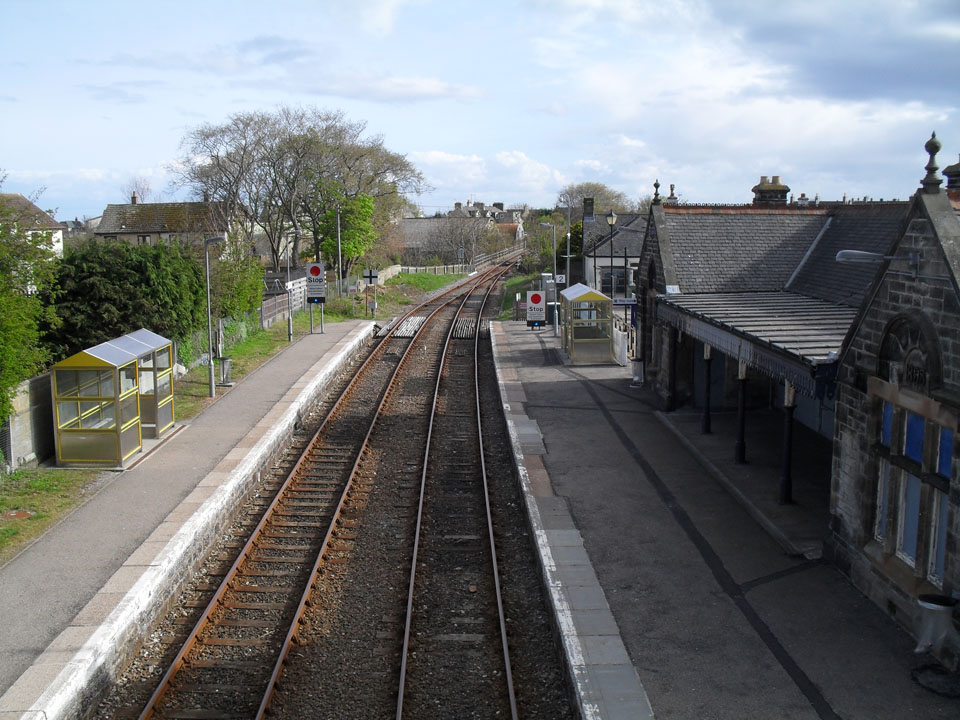
- The platforms at Brora, looking south

General information
- Location: Brora, Highland; Scotland
- Coordinates: 58.0131°N 3.8523°W
- Grid reference: NC906041
- Manager: ScotRail
- Platforms: 2

Other information
- Station code: BRA

History
- Original company: Duke of Sutherland's Railway
- Pre-grouping: Highland Railway
- Post-grouping: London, Midland and Scottish Railway

Key dates
- 1 November 1870: Opened

Passengers
- 2021/22: ▲4,722
- 2022/23: ▼4,594
- 2023/24: ▲5,990
- 2024/25: ▼5,836
- 2025/26: ▼5,540

Listed Building – Category C(S)
- Designated: 23 July 1987
- Reference no.: LB571
Location
Notes
- Passenger statistics from the Office of Rail and Road

Brora railway station (/ˈbrɔːrə/) is a railway station serving the small town of Brora in the Highland council area of Scotland. The station is on the Far North Line, 90 miles 48 chains (145.8 km) from Inverness, between Dunrobin Castle and Helmsdale. ScotRail, who manage the station, operate all services.

== History ==
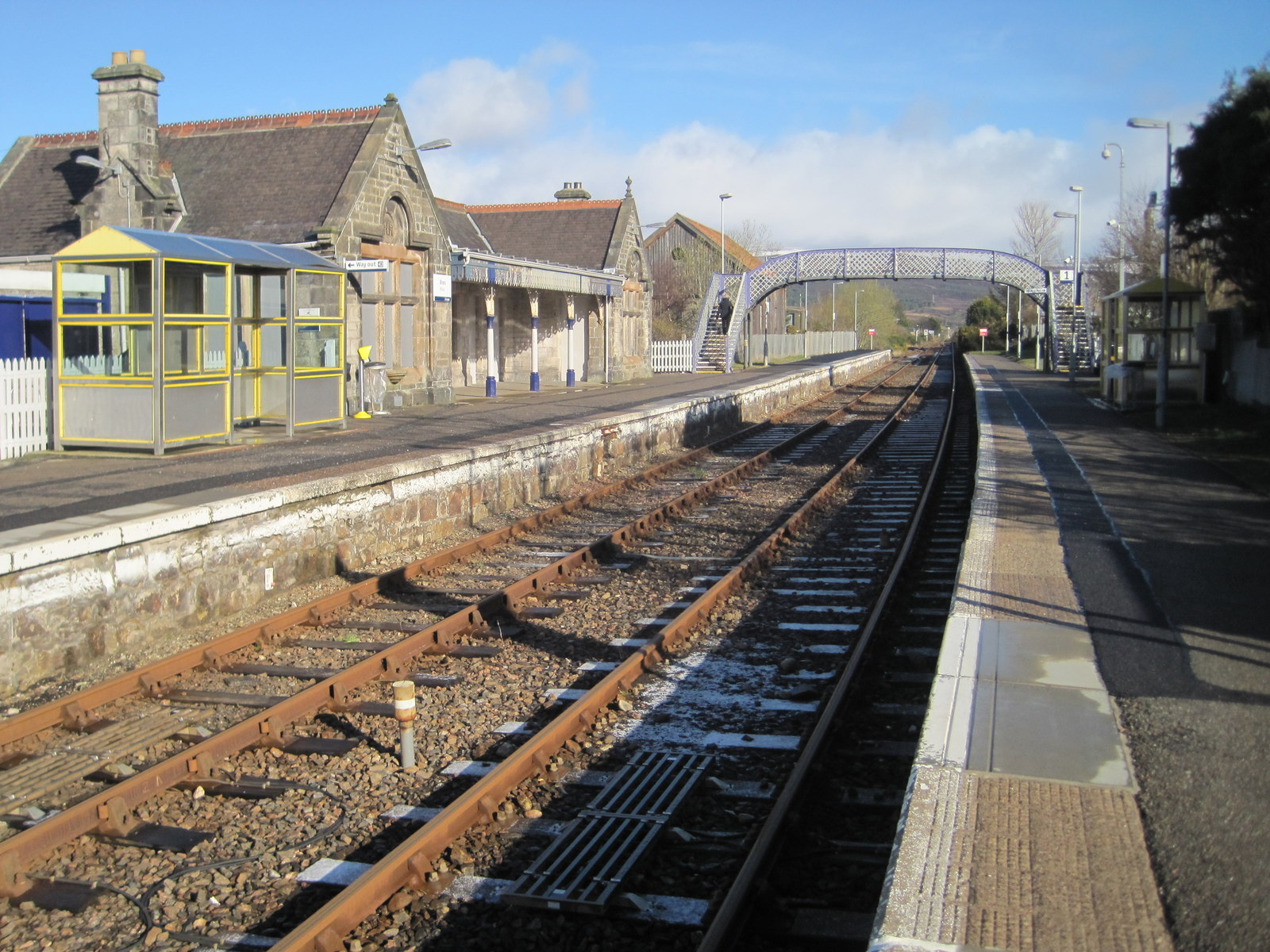
The platforms, looking north

The station opened on 1 November 1870. The former station buildings are now unused but together with the cast iron footbridge are a listed building.

In the early 1870s the Duke of Sutherland opened a coal mine and adjacent brickworks at Brora which were connected by a tramway to sidings just north of Brora station.

In 1895 new station buildings were erected, probably designed by the engineer William Roberts.

In 2019, plans were announced by a local businessperson to redevelop the station building into "a micro gin distillery, café bar, tourist information point and gift shop", at a cost of £500,000.

== Facilities ==
The station has basic facilities, including waiting shelters on both platforms, and a small car park and bike racks adjacent to platform 2. Both platforms have step-free access, but are also connected by a footbridge.

== Passenger volume ==
The main origin or destination station for journeys to or from Brora station in the 2022/23 period was Inverness, making up 1,352 of the 4,594 journeys (29.43%).

Passenger Volume at Brora
	2004–05	2005–06	2006–07	2007–08	2008–09	2009–10	2010–11	2011–12	2012–13	2013–14	2014–15	2015–16	2016–17	2017–18	2018–19	2019–20	2020–21	2021–22	2022–23	2023–24	2024–25
Entries and exits	3,462	3,483	3,277	3,723	4,660	5,614	5,780	5,164	5,556	6,380	5,616	5,524	5,616	5,994	6,992	6,354	648	4,722	4,594	5,990	5,836

The statistics cover twelve month periods that start in April.

== Services ==
There are four departures each weekday & Saturday, and one each way on a Sunday. Trains run northbound to Wick via Thurso and southbound to Lairg, Dingwall and Inverness.

Preceding station	National Rail	Following station
Dunrobin Castle or Golspie	ScotRail; Far North Line	Helmsdale
	Historical railways	
Dunrobin Castle; Line and station open	Highland Railway; Duke of Sutherland's Railway	Loth; Line open, station closed

== Bibliography ==
- Brailsford, Martyn, ed. (December 2017) [1987]. Railway Track Diagrams 1: Scotland & Isle of Man (6th ed.). Frome: Trackmaps. ISBN 978-0-9549866-9-8.
- Butt, R. V. J. (October 1995). The Directory of Railway Stations: details every public and private passenger station, halt, platform and stopping place, past and present (1st ed.). Sparkford: Patrick Stephens Ltd. ISBN 978-1-85260-508-7. OCLC 60251199. OL 11956311M.
- Quick, Michael (2022). Railway Passenger Stations in Great Britain: A Chronology (PDF) (5th ed.). London: Railway and Canal Historical Society. Archived from the original (PDF) on 15 March 2023.
