= Càrn Liath =

Càrn Liath (Scottish Gaelic for grey cairn) may refer to any of the following:

== Mountains ==
- Càrn Liath (Beinn a' Ghlò) (975 m) — a Munro
- Càrn Liath (Monadh Liath) (1,006 m) - a Munro
- Càrn Liath (Braemar) (862 m) - a Corbett

== Other ==
- Càrn Liath (broch) - a broch in Sutherland
