= James Maxwell Joass =

James Maxwell Joass (1830–1914) was a Scottish minister remembered as a geologist, archaeologist and antiquarian. His multiple excavations often combined his geological and archaeological skills.

== Life ==
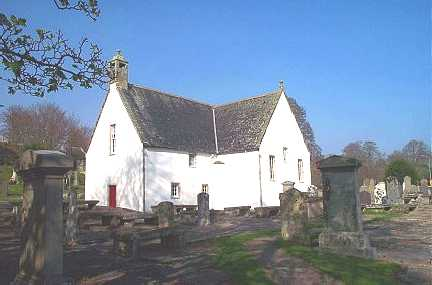
Golspie Parish Church

He was born in Tain, Ross-shire on 8 April 1830, the eldest son of John Joass, a guard on the Inverness to Aberdeen mail coach. He was educated at Inverness Royal Academy and Inverness Grammar School then studied Divinity at King's College, Aberdeen and graduated MA in March 1850.

He worked as a tutor to the children of Mr Scott of Tullich in Lochcarron whilst awaiting a position. In 1855 he was appointed missionary at Kilmonivaig in the western Highlands. He was ordained as the Church of Scotland minister for Edderton in November 1859.

From 1866 to 1914 he was minister at St andrews Church in Golspie (Golspie Parish Church).

He was a Member of the Geological Society of London from at least 1869. He was a member of the Society of Antiquaries of Scotland from at least 1872.

He died at the manse at Golspie on 8 June 1914. He is buried in the churchyard at Golspie.

== Family ==
He was uncle to the architect John James Joass.

== Publications ==
- Two Days Digging in Sutherland (1865)
- Notes on the Sutherland Gold Field (1869)
