= William Fowler (architect) =

Scottish architect (1824–1906)

William Fowler (1 August 1824 – 3 February 1906) was a 19th-century Scottish architect closely linked to the northern town of Golspie and the surrounding area.

== Life ==
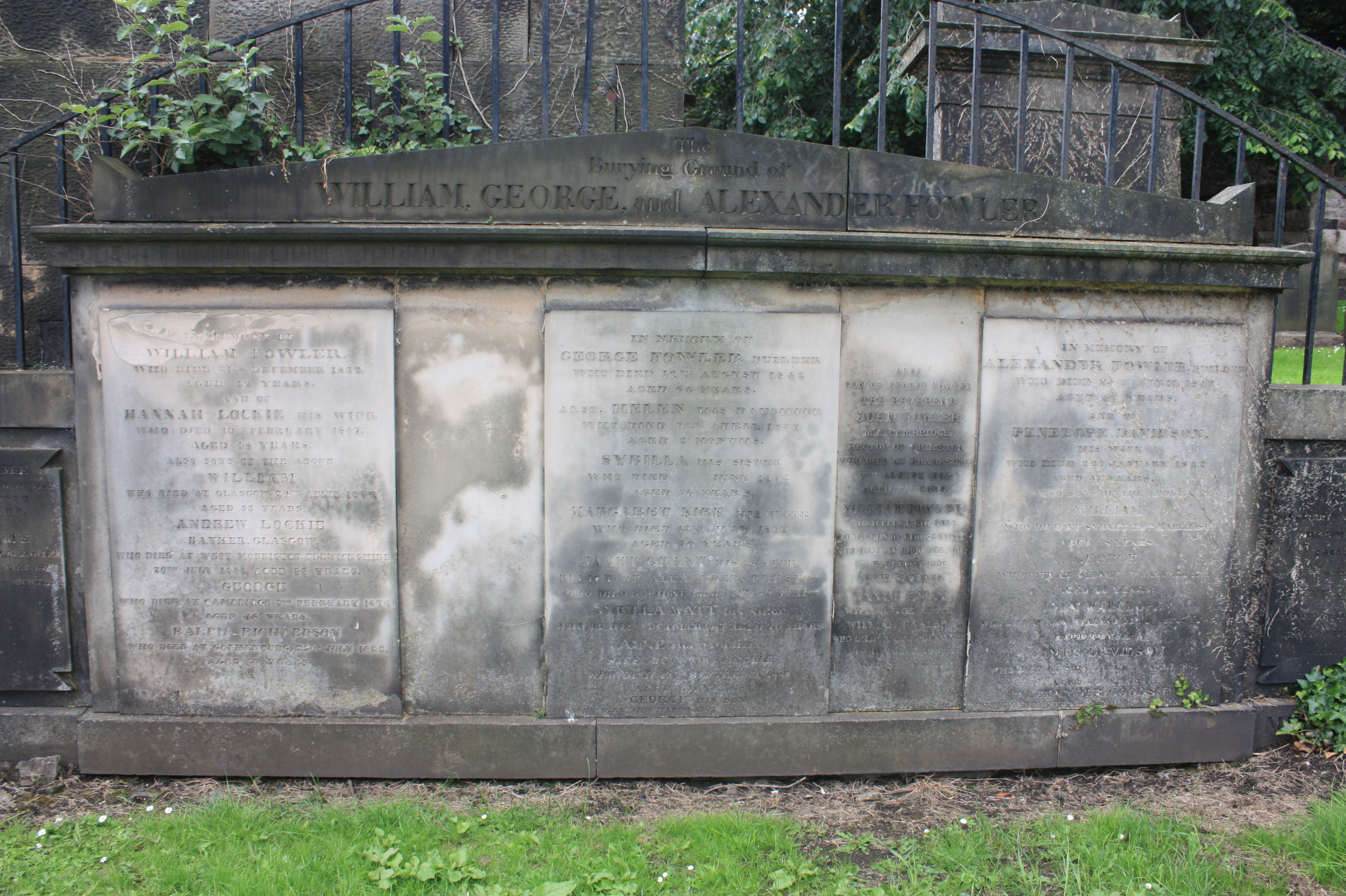
The Fowler grave, New Calton Cemetery, Edinburgh

He was born at 28 Jamaica Street in Edinburgh's Second New Town the son of George Fowler (1798-1862) a builder, and his wife Margaret Kirk. His uncle Alexander Fowler was also a builder. He was apprenticed as an architect to David Bryce.

He received employment with the 2nd Duke of Sutherland as his estate surveyor (working with the architect George Devey), and later overseeing the vast building project at Dunrobin Castle, designed by Sir Charles Barry. During this period he began living in Golspie where he thereafter had a lifelong connection. From 1881 he lived at 7 Duke Street in Golspie. In 1891 he retired and moved to Greenend in Liberton, Edinburgh. In 1900 he moved to Mount Chasse (now 11) Broomieknowe in Lasswade, south of Edinburgh.

He died at Mount Chasse on 3 February 1906. He is buried with his parents at New Calton Cemetery in Edinburgh.

== Known works ==
- Flagstaff Lodge, Dunrobin Castle (1850)
- Parish School New Pitsligo (1855)
- Houses, New Pitsligo (1856)
- Belfry on Helmsdale Chapel of Ease (1857)
- Inveran Inn (1857)
- Belfry on St Callan's Church Rogart (1857)
- Remodelling of Dornoch Castle (1859)
- Conversion of Girnal House into 5 houses, Littleferry (1859)
- School and schoolhouse, Embo (1859)
- Strathsteven Lodge (1864)
- Clynelish House, Golspie (1865)
- Co-operative Society Shop, Golspie (1867)
- Golspie railway station and post office (1868)
- Rhifail House (1868)
- Helmsdale railway station (1871)
- Culag Lodge, Lochinver (1873)
- Hope Lodge, Eriboll (1875)
- Bank, Golspie (1877)
- Manse, Rogart (built 1882)
