= Ben Bhraggie =

Hill in Scotland

- Beinn a' Bhragaidh
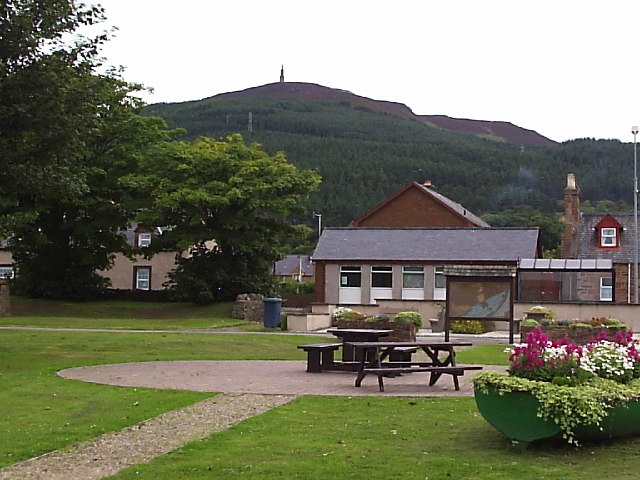
- View of Ben Bhraggie from Golspie

Highest point
- Elevation: 397 m (1,302 ft)
- Parent peak: Beinn Lunndaidh
- Coordinates: 57°58′57″N 4°00′37″W

Geography
- Location within Scotland
- Location: Sutherland, Highland, Scotland
- OS grid: NC811010
- Topo map: OS Landranger 17, Explorer 441

Ben Bhraggie (Scottish Gaelic: Beinn a' Bhragaidh) is a hill in Scotland which rises to an elevation of 397 metres (1,302 ft) above sea level. The hill dominates the skyline above the village of Golspie and is visible from many parts of east Sutherland. The 100-foot-tall (30-metre) statue which is perched on top is that of George Leveson-Gower, Marquess of Stafford and first Duke of Sutherland who became notorious through the part he played in the Highland clearances.

== George Leveson-Gower ==
Leveson-Gower was born in 1758, the son of the Marquess of Stafford. In 1785 he married Elizabeth, daughter of the Earl of Sutherland. She had inherited the Earldom and its associated estates following a well-known legal case which established the unusual principle that the Earldom could pass through the female as well as the male line.

In the early nineteenth century the couple initiated sweeping reforms to their estate in Sutherland. This is where the Duke's reputation will vary, depending upon whom you are talking to. Some would say that he was shocked by the conditions his tenants were living in and he became convinced that the interior of Sutherland could not support these subsistence farmers long term. Advised to follow the latest economic and social theories he decided to resettle the population in new villages along the coast to make way for large sheep farms inland. The other – and probably more common view – is that he decided it would be more profitable for the estate to turn the land over to large scale sheep farming, and so the tenants would have to go, whether they wanted to or not.

Either way, these reforms led to thousands of people being evicted from their homes and farms. Across the Highlands, it was common for the roof timbers of cleared houses to be burnt, to prevent re-occupation after the eviction parties had left. In 1819 the coincidence of this practice with a spell of dry weather and the eviction of 425 families led to the Observer newspaper running the headline: "the Devastation of Sutherland". 1819 became known as "the year of the burnings" (bliadhna na losgaidh). The Sutherland clearances were not by any means the only clearances – this period saw similar occurrences throughout Scotland, not just in the Highlands but in many rural lowland areas as well. However, the Sutherland clearances were probably the largest clearance in the Highlands, measured in terms of the probable number of people evicted.

The Countess of Sutherland, Leveson-Gower's wife, had a substantial role in oversight of the management of the Sutherland Estate. This was unusual for the time - but Leveson-Gower delegated most of this activity to her. She visited the estate every year and was in extensive correspondence with both the estate factor and the commissioner. Her husband's main activity was to provide the substantial amounts of money needed for the reorganisation of the estate.

Leveson-Gower was created first Duke of Sutherland for his services to politics in 1833, just a few months before his death. He died in July of that year at Dunrobin Castle and was buried at Dornoch Cathedral. In 1834 a subscription was started in order to pay for a monument in his memory. Subscriptions came in from far and wide, which is surprising given his reputation today. Work soon began and the stone for the massive base and plinth was quarried from the north east side of Ben Bhraggie, about 50 yards (45 metres) from the monument's location. The statue itself was sculpted by Sir Francis Chantrey and it was taken up to the top of the Ben in pieces by horse and cart. The monument was completed in 1837 and it has dominated the views of east Sutherland ever since; it is known locally as the "Mannie".

== The Mannie ==
There have been calls for the statue to be removed or demolished. Graffiti has been sprayed across the plinth several times and the word "monster" was sprayed across it in green paint.

As recently as November 2011 two large sandstone sections were wrenched out from the massive plinth supporting the 100 ft (30 m) statue – the sections were left lying on the grass beside the statue.

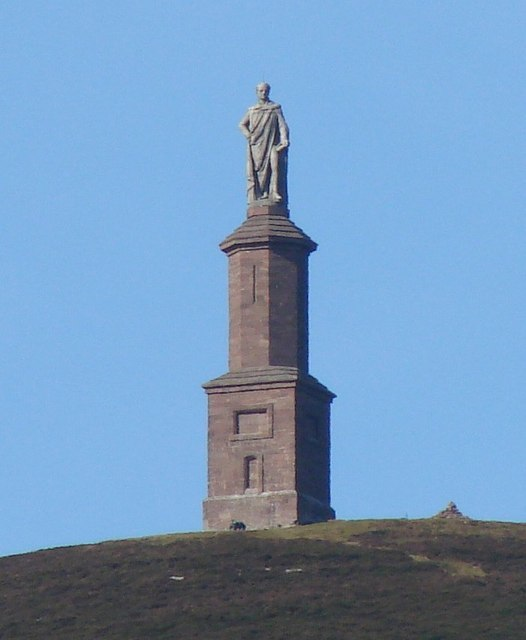
"The Mannie"— statue erected to George Leveson-Gower on the summit of Ben Bhraggie

Since the first attempt, recent repair work has since been undone and even more stones have been extracted from the northwest corner of the plinth. Police believe an ongoing campaign is being waged to topple the statue over.

An unsuccessful campaign was launched in 1995 by the late Sandy Lindsay, of Newtonmore, to tear down the statue, and erect a commemorative Celtic Cross or plaque dedicated to the victims of the Clearances. The campaign began a dialogue about the statue’s destruction and removal which still continues. There was a failed attempt by vandals to topple the statue in November 2011. A BBC news report of this incident quoted a local person saying that few people wished the statue removed; instead they saw it as an important reminder of history.

== Sport and the arts ==
A network of mountain bike trails, the Highland Wildcat Trails, have been built on side of Ben Bhraggie. This features black and red graded routes, going from the summit of the hill down to the village of Golspie, including the longest singletrack descent in the UK at around 7 km.

Ben Bhraggie features in a sentimental Scots song Granny's Hieland Hame.
