= Granny's Hieland Hame =

Granny's Hieland Hame is a Scottish song, composed and first recorded by Thomas "Sandy" MacFarlane. - a Scottish singer who, in the early part of the 20th century, emigrated to the United States of America.

It was popular in the past, and has been recorded by several singers.

The title is also now the name of a campsite in Embo, near Dornoch, Sutherland
