= West Helmsdale railway station =

Short-lived railway station in West Helmsdale, Highland

West Helmsdale

General information
- Location: West Helmsdale, Sutherland; Scotland
- Coordinates: 58.1062°N 3.6686°W
- Grid reference: ND017142
- Platforms: 1

Other information
- Status: Disused

History
- Original company: Duke of Sutherland's Railway
- Pre-grouping: Duke of Sutherland's Railway

Key dates
- 1 November 1870: Opened
- 19 June 1871: Closed
Location

West Helmsdale railway station served the settlement of West Helmsdale, in the historical county of Sutherland, from 1870 to 1871 on the Duke of Sutherland's Railway.

== History ==
The station was opened on 1 November 1870 by the Duke of Sutherland's Railway. It was a short-lived terminus, being replaced by Loth on 19 June 1871.

| Preceding station | Historical railways | Following station |
|---|---|---|
| Terminus | Duke of Sutherland's Railway | Loth; Line open, station closed |
