= Carn Liath (broch) =

Iron Age broch in the Scottish Highlands

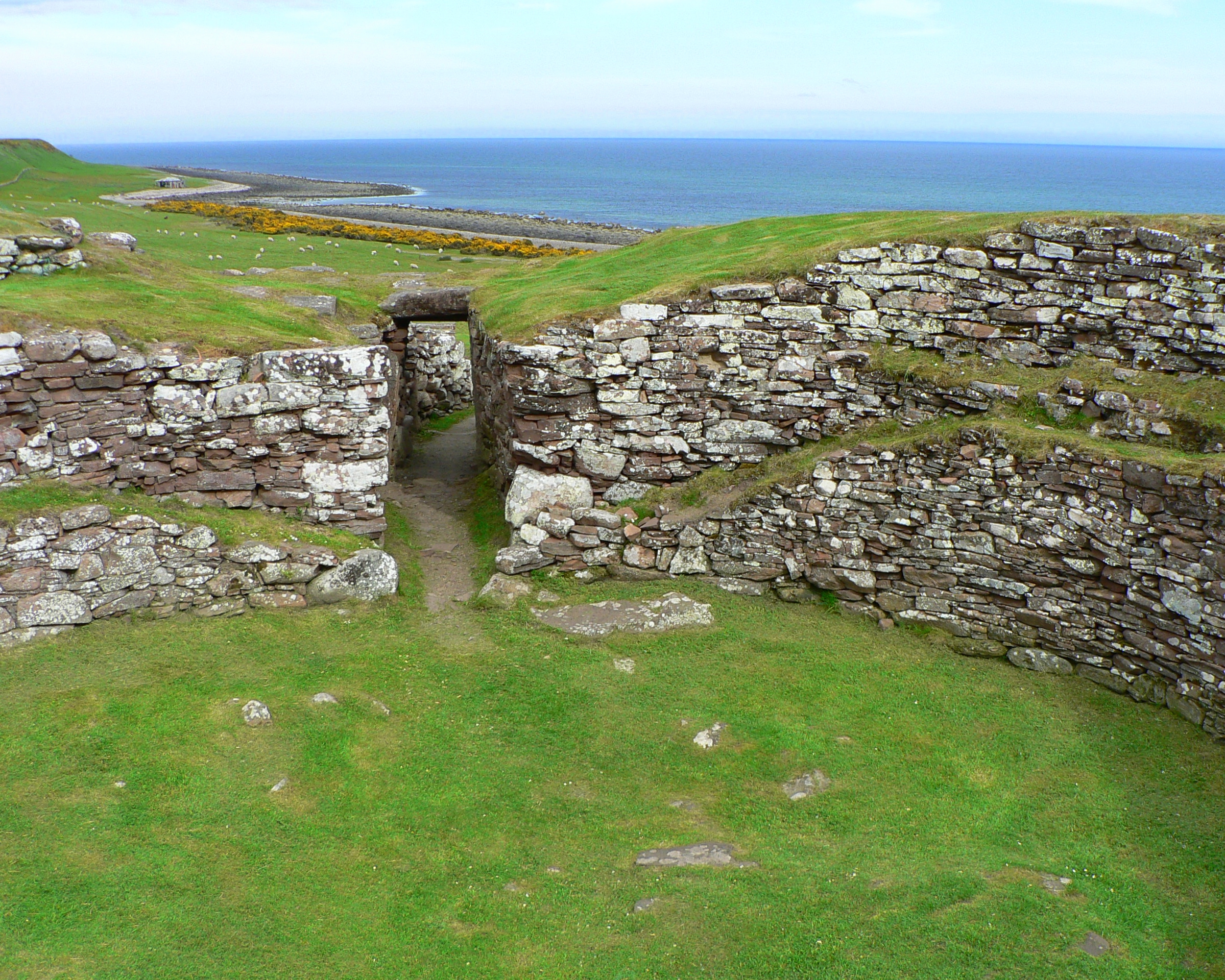
- Interior of Carn Liath

- Location within Highland
- 57°59′14″N 3°54′43″W
- Type: Broch
- Periods: Iron Age
- Location: Scottish Highlands

Site notes
- Owner: Historic Environment Scotland

Càrn Liath (English: Grey Cairn) is an Iron Age broch on the eastern shore of the Scottish Highlands, near Golspie, Sutherland.

== Location ==
The broch is located near Golspie in Sutherland. It stands beside the A9 road, around 4 kilometres northeast of Golspie. The site is under the care of Historic Environment Scotland and has a car-park and information board for visitors.

== Description ==
The broch has an external diameter of around 19 metres and an internal diameter of around 10 metres. The broch wall is particularly thick. The entrance passage is on the east side and is over 4 metres long. The entrance has elaborate door checks and a bar-hole to control access to the interior. On the right-hand side of the entrance passage is a small guard cell.

The surrounding enclosure contains the ruins of additional stone buildings.

== Excavations ==
The broch was first excavated in the 19th century by the Duke of Sutherland, and was initially thought to be a burial cairn. Finds included pottery, flint chips, stone hammers, mortars and pestles, querns, whorls, shale rings, long-handled bone combs, a whale bone club, a silver fibula, steatite cups and an iron blade.

In 1909 the entrance passage was still visible on the east side of the broch, but by 1960 no structural features were discernible.

The site was excavated again in 1986. This showed that the site was occupied in the Bronze Age, before the broch was built. A Bronze Age cist burial with a food vessel was discovered. The foundations of many outbuildings were found in the enclosure surrounding the broch. Although many were clearly from a later period, some may have been contemporary with the broch.
