= Golspie railway station =

Railway station in Highland, Scotland

Golspie Scottish Gaelic: Goillspidh
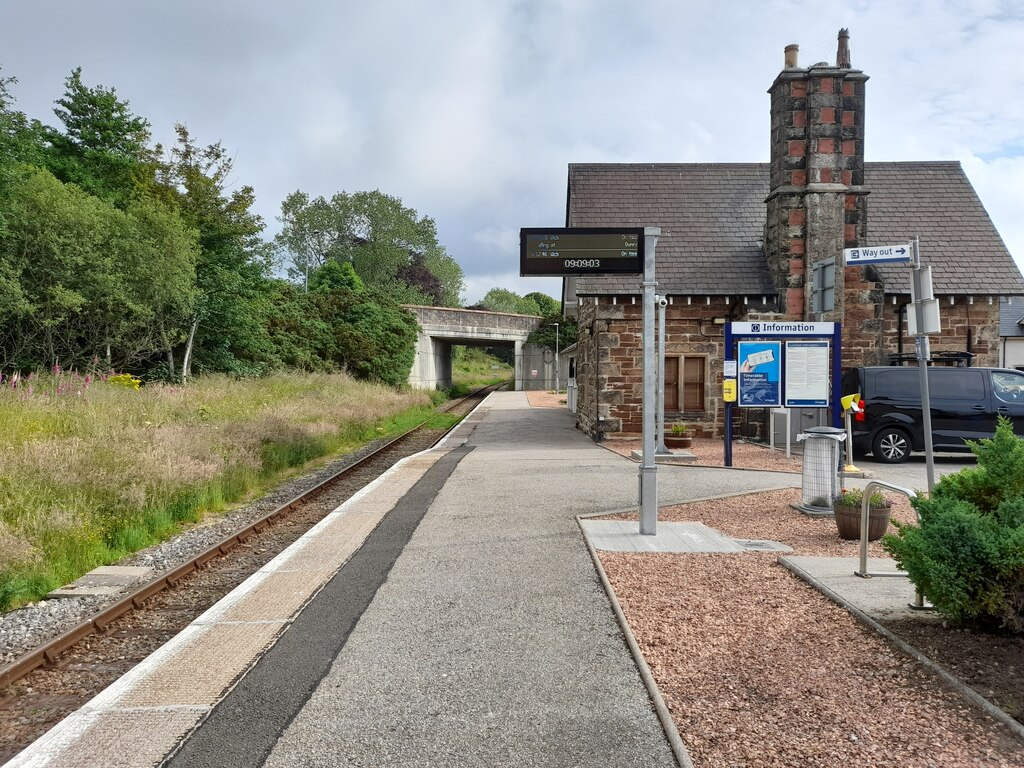

General information
- Location: Golspie, Highland; Scotland
- Coordinates: 57.9712°N 3.9874°W
- Grid reference: NH825997
- Manager: ScotRail
- Platforms: 1

Other information
- Station code: GOL

History
- Original company: Sutherland Railway
- Pre-grouping: Highland Railway
- Post-grouping: LMSR

Key dates
- 13 April 1868: Opened as terminus
- 19 June 1871: Line extended to Helmsdale

Passengers
- 2021/22: ▲4,536
- 2022/23: ▼4,056
- 2023/24: ▲5,320
- 2024/25: ▲5,352
- 2025/26: ▼4,898

Listed Building – Category B
- Designated: 7 March 1984
- Reference no.: LB7009
Location
Notes
- Passenger statistics from the Office of Rail and Road

Golspie railway station is a railway station serving the village of Golspie in the Highland council area of Scotland. It is on the Far North Line, situated between Rogart and Dunrobin Castle, 84 miles 30 chains (135.8 km) from Inverness. ScotRail, who manage the station, operate all services.

== History ==
It was designed with a combined post office by the architect William Fowler, and opened on 13 April 1868. Originally, it was the northern terminus of the Sutherland Railway, which had been intended to continue to Brora but had run out of money after reaching Golspie. The Duke of Sutherland used his own personal finances to build the line onwards through Brora to Helmsdale, this being the Duke of Sutherland's Railway, completed on 19 June 1871.

The station formerly had two platforms and a passing loop. One platform remains in use and the loop has been lifted.

The former goods yard is to the south of the station. The station hosted an LMS caravan from 1935 to 1939. A camping coach was also positioned here by the Scottish Region from 1957 to 1959 and 1964, no coaches were at the station in 1960 and 1961, then a Pullman camping coach was here in 1962, 1963 and 1965 and finally two ordinary coaches were here in 1966 and 1967.

== Facilities ==
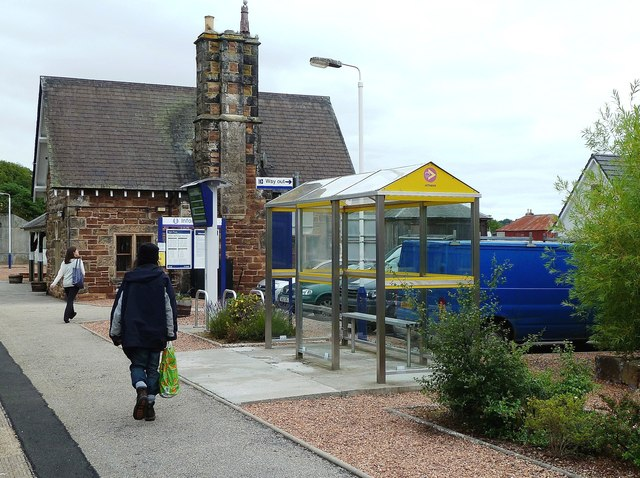
Golspie station, as seen in 2012

The station has one platform, with a small car park, a waiting shelter, bike racks and a help point. As there are no facilities to purchase tickets, passengers must buy one in advance, or from the guard on the train.

== Passenger volume ==
Passenger Volume at Golspie
	2004–05	2005–06	2006–07	2007–08	2008–09	2009–10	2010–11	2011–12	2012–13	2013–14	2014–15	2015–16	2016–17	2017–18	2018–19	2019–20	2020–21	2021–22	2022–23	2023–24	2024–25
Entries and exits	7,530	7,429	6,956	7,587	9,154	8,486	8,092	6,852	7,550	7,788	6,770	5,192	5,718	5,786	6,150	5,586	576	4,536	4,056	5,320	5,352

The statistics cover twelve month periods that start in April.

== Services ==
On weekdays and Saturdays, there are 4 trains each way (4 to Inverness and 4 to Wick). On Sundays, this drops to just one in each direction.

Preceding station	National Rail	Following station
Rogart	ScotRail; Far North Line	Dunrobin Castle or Brora
	Historical railways	
The Mound; Line open, station closed	Highland Railway; Sutherland Railway; Duke of Sutherland's Railway	Dunrobin Castle; Line and station open
