= Dunrobin Castle railway station =

Railway station in Highland, Scotland

Dunrobin Castle Scottish Gaelic: Caisteal Dhùn Robain
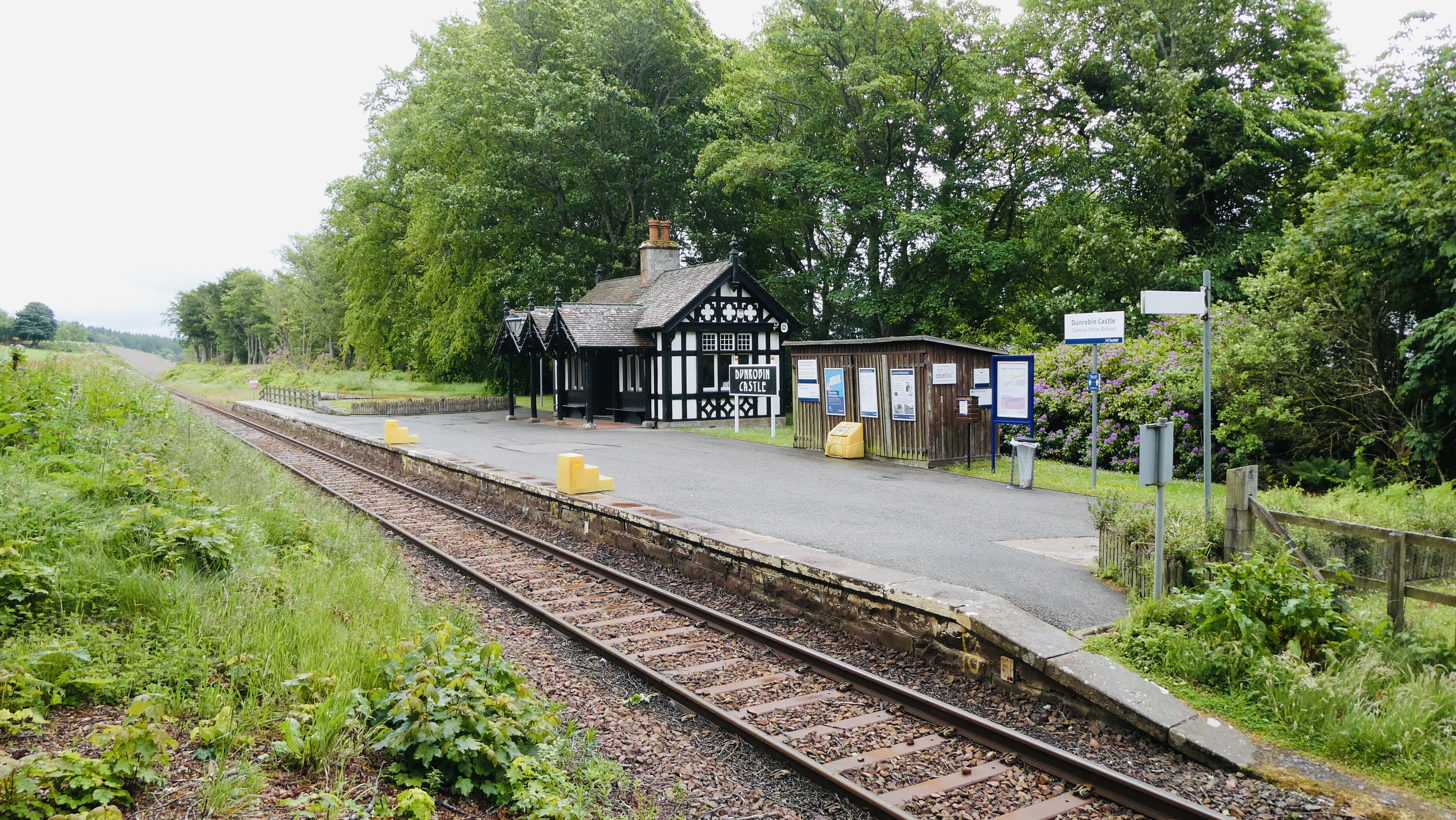
- The platform at Dunrobin Castle, looking east

General information
- Location: Dunrobin Castle, Highland; Scotland
- Coordinates: 57.9859°N 3.9470°W
- Grid reference: NC849012
- Manager: ScotRail
- Platforms: 1

Other information
- Station code: DNO

History
- Original company: Duke of Sutherland's Railway

Key dates
- 1 November 1870: Opened
- 19 June 1871: Closed to public becoming fully private
- 29 January 1965: Closed
- 30 June 1985: Reopened

Passengers
- 2021/22: ▲770
- 2022/23: ▲1,428
- 2023/24: ▲1,940
- 2024/25: ▼1,544
- 2025/26: ▲1,686
Location
Notes
- Passenger statistics from the Office of Rail and Road

Dunrobin Castle railway station is a railway station on the Far North Line in Scotland, serving Dunrobin Castle near the village of Golspie in the Highland council area. The station is 86 miles 22 chains (138.8 km) from Inverness, between Golspie and Brora. ScotRail, who manage the station, operate all services.

== History ==
It was originally a private station for the castle, the seat of the Duke of Sutherland. It was opened on 1 November 1870 for public but became a private station soon after on 19 June 1871. It was officially closed on 29 November 1965 but reopened on 30 June 1985 for summer services.

The Arts and Crafts style waiting room was designed by L Bisset and constructed in 1902, and is a category B listed building.

It was described in the Railway Magazine:

The Duke of Sutherland has a beautiful private railway station. As is well known, his Grace owns a large proportion of the North of Scotland, and his famous seat of Dunrobin Castle in that district has its own station for the Duke and his household, called after the Castle, "Dunrobin." The station is one of those on the line of the Highland Railway, and lies between Brora and Golspie, in Sutherlandshire. The Duke has had the place made not only serviceable, but very picturesque in its design and finish.

The general outline seems to be that of a Swiss chalet, and this appearance is not lessened by the surrounding hilly district. The windows are latticed, and look very cosy, whilst all the waiting-rooms and other necessary adjuncts to such a station are well fitted up. With true patriotism his lordship determined that Scotch pine should be used as far as possible in the construction of his station, so that he had it built of that wood. Thus it is extremely strongly made, as it needs to be to resist the ravages of snow and wind that sweep so terribly across the Sutherland moors in winter.

As a rule the platforms of private stations are very small, but this one at Dunrobin is an exception. It is very long, for often the family at the Castle will entertain three or four hundred guests at a time, when important fêtes or events are taking place there.

== Facilities ==
The station has no facilities, except for a small waiting area and the old station buildings, including a privately owned toilet - the northernmost station in Great Britain to have a toilet on the station platform.

In May 2023, Transport Scotland introduced a new "Press & Ride" system at Dunrobin Castle, following successful trials of the system at other request stops on the line over the previous nine months. Previously, passengers wishing to board a train at Dunrobin Castle had to flag the train by raising their arm (as is still done at other request stops around the country); this meant that the driver needed to reduce the train's speed before a request stop (to look out for any potential passengers on the platform and be able to stop if necessary), even if the platform was empty. The new system consists of an automatic kiosk (with a button for passengers to press) at the platform; this will alert the driver about any waiting passengers in advance and, if there is no requirement to stop, the train can maintain line speed through the request stops, thus improving reliability on the whole line.

== Passenger volume ==
Passenger Volume at Dunrobin Castle
	2004–05	2005–06	2006–07	2007–08	2008–09	2009–10	2010–11	2011–12	2012–13	2013–14	2014–15	2015–16	2016–17	2017–18	2018–19	2019–20	2020–21	2021–22	2022–23	2023–24	2024–25
Entries and exits	299	357	357	423	572	488	594	628	628	916	822	782	882	1,030	1,224	1,240	114	770	1,428	1,940	1,544

The statistics cover twelve month periods that start in April.

== Services ==
Unlike other stations on the line, the station is only open when the castle itself is open, and is closed from late October to March every year. On weekdays and Saturdays, the station sees three trains each way, with one train towards Inverness on Sundays. No trains call before 9am or after 6pm.

Preceding station	National Rail	Following station
Golspie	ScotRail; Far North Line	Brora

== Cultural references ==
The station was featured on an episode of Michael Portillo's Great British Railway Journeys in 2012, in which he opened the restored toilet in the former station buildings.

== Bibliography ==
- Brailsford, Martyn, ed. (December 2017) [1987]. Railway Track Diagrams 1: Scotland & Isle of Man (6th ed.). Frome: Trackmaps. ISBN 978-0-9549866-9-8.
- Butt, R. V. J. (October 1995). The Directory of Railway Stations: details every public and private passenger station, halt, platform and stopping place, past and present (1st ed.). Sparkford: Patrick Stephens Ltd. ISBN 978-1-85260-508-7. OCLC 60251199. OL 11956311M.
- Caton, Peter (2018). Remote Stations. Leicestershire: Matador. ISBN 978-1-78901-408-2.
- Quick, Michael (2023). Railway Passenger Stations in Great Britain: A Chronology (PDF) (5th ed.). London: Railway and Canal Historical Society.
