= Duke of Sutherland's Railway =

UK railway company

Overview
- Locale: Scotland
- Dates of operation: 1 November 1870–28 July 1884
- Successor: Highland Railway

Technical
- Track gauge: 4 ft 8 1/2 in (1,435 mm)

The Duke of Sutherland's Railway was a railway in Sutherland, Scotland, built by the 3rd Duke of Sutherland.

The Sutherland Railway had opened in 1868, terminating at Golspie railway station. The Duke continued the line to Helmsdale railway station from his own resources. It opened from Dunrobin Castle station to West Helmsdale station in 1870, and for some months the Duke had it operated as a private railway. In 1871 the line was completed from Golspie to Helmsdale, and operated as a part of the Highland Railway.

It was absorbed into the Highland Railway in 1884 and continues in use today as part of the Far North Line.

== Inverness to Golspie ==
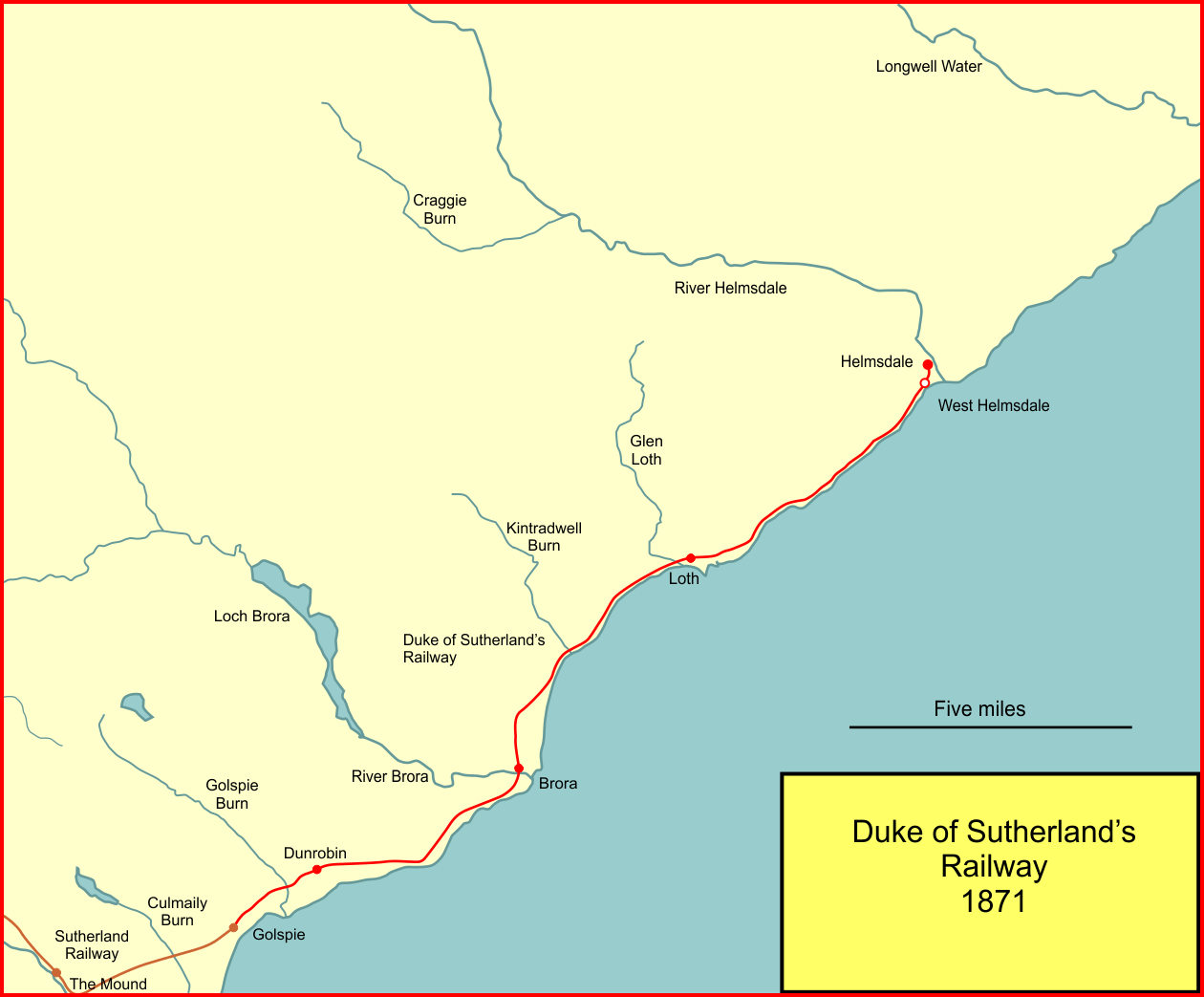
The Duke of Sutherland's Railway in 1871

Interests in Inverness pressed to get a railway connection to Central Scotland and the south. The engineer Joseph Mitchell was dynamic in showing how this could be done, starting with what became the Inverness and Nairn Railway, opened in 1855.

As well as eventually connecting Inverness to Aberdeen by means of the Inverness and Aberdeen Junction Railway (with the assistance of the Great North of Scotland Railway and Perth by means of the Inverness and Perth Junction Railway, consideration was given to northward railway connections. The first step in this was the Inverness and Ross-shire Railway which opened as far as a Bonar Bridge station on 1 October 1864.

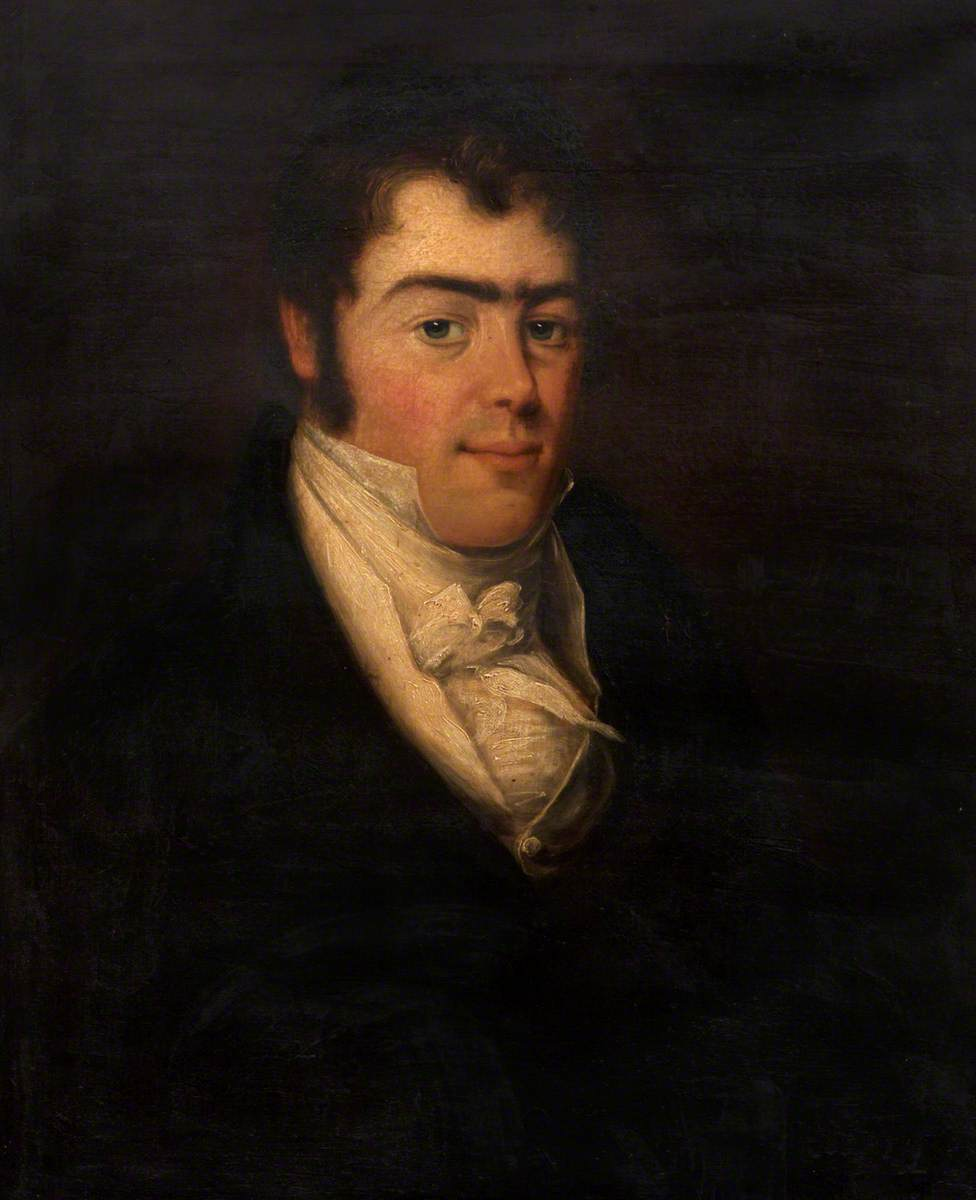
Joseph Mitchell

Next came the Sutherland Railway which obtained powers in an act of Parliament to build a line from Bonar Bridge to Brora in 1865. This was assisted by the commercial drive and financial resources of the Duke of Sutherland. The Duke was owner of extensive lands in Sutherland, and he harboured an interest in railways, and in developing the resources of the area for the benefit of the inhabitants.

The Sutherland Railway actually ran out of money when it reached Golspie, and was unable to continue to Brora as authorised. By now the Inverness and Ross-shire Railway had been absorbed into the Inverness and Aberdeen Junction Railway, and it was only by the negotiating pressure of the Duke of Sutherland that the line reached Golspie. The Duke of Sutherland had a seat at Dunrobin Castle, which would have been on the Brora line, but was now not railway connected.

== The Duke of Sutherland's Railway ==
Duke of Sutherland's Railway Act 1870
- Act of Parliament
- Parliament of the United Kingdom
- Long title: An Act for the making of a Railway from Golspie to Helmsdale in the county of Sutherland, and for the abandonment of part of the authorised railway of the Sutherland Railway Company; and for other purposes.
- Citation: 33 & 34 Vict. c. xxxi

Dates
- Royal assent: 20 June 1870

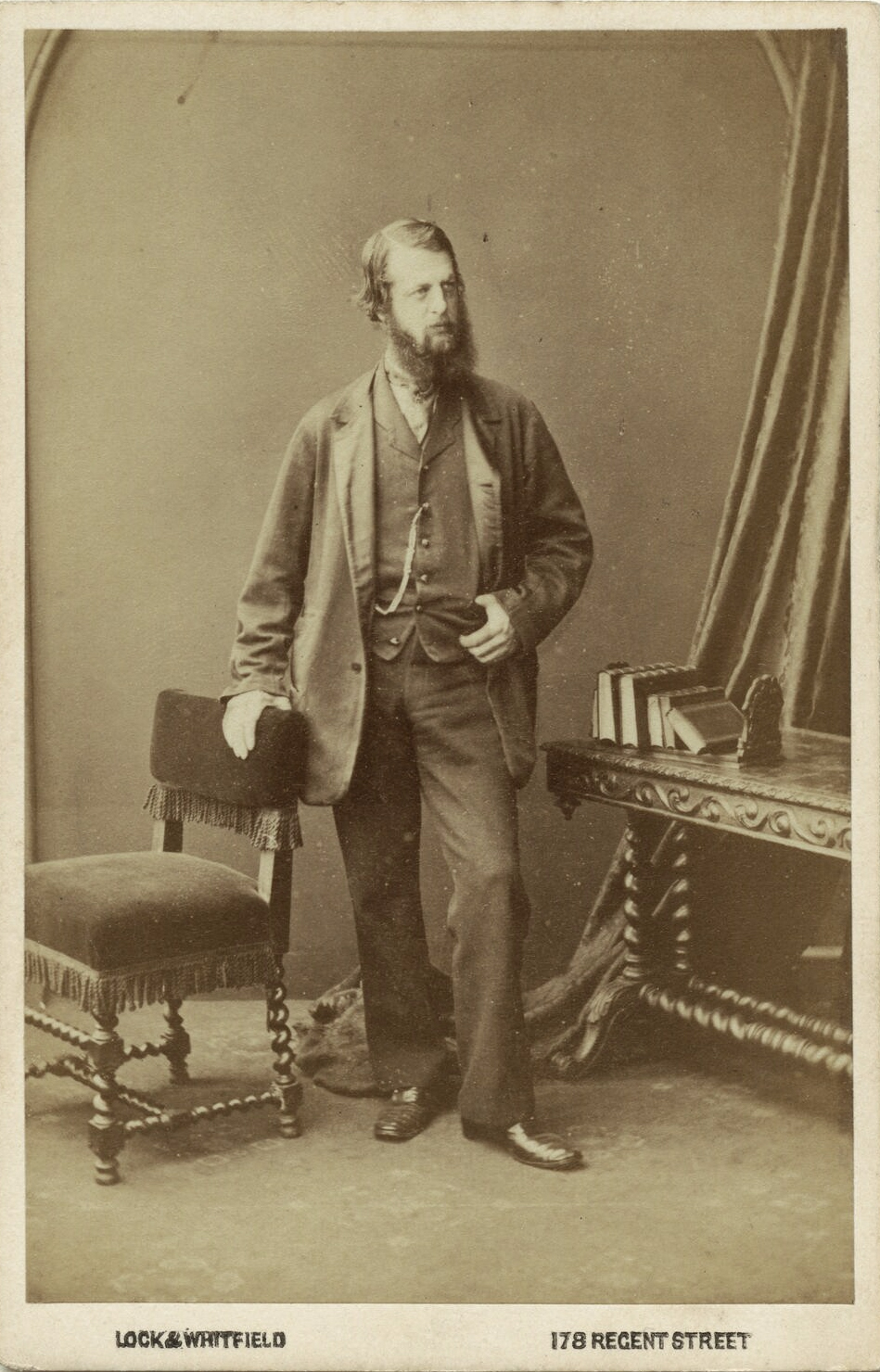
The Third Duke of Sutherland

The Duke of Sutherland decided to build a line himself, and this became the Duke of Sutherland's Railway. It obtained its authorising act of Parliament, the Duke of Sutherland's Railway Act 1870 (33 & 34 Vict. c. xxxi) on 20 June 1870. The act authorised a 17-mile line along the coast from Golspie to Helmsdale, on the borders of Caithness, taking over the Golspie to Brora powers of the Sutherland Railway.

Engineering difficulties at both ends of the line delayed the completion of the line throughout, but the section from Dunrobin to a point just short of Helmsdale was finished by the autumn of 1870. The Duke decided that the railway should be opened forthwith, and a temporary station, known as West Helmsdale, was built at Gartymore. An engine and some coaches were purchased for working the line, but since there was as yet no physical connection with the Sutherland Railway at Golspie, the stock had to be placed on wagons and hauled along the road by a traction engine.

The opening ceremony was performed on 17 September 1870 by Princess Christian of Schleswig-Holstein. As Princess Helena, she was the third daughter of Queen Victoria, and on marriage to Prince Christian of Schleswig-Holstein she adopted the style of Princess Christian. From the date of the opening ceremony, the railway was privately operated, but after a Board of Trade inspection it was opened to the public on 1 November 1870.

After the public opening, a service of two trains a day in each direction was run. On 19 June 1871 the works were completed and the railway was opened throughout, and the Highland Railway took over the working. The temporary terminus at Dunrobin became a private station serving the castle, at which trains called by request to pick up or set down passengers. In 1902 the buildings were reconstructed to the designs of the estate architect.

On 28 July 1884 the Duke of Sutherland's Railway was absorbed into the Highland Railway by the Highland Railway (Northern Lines Amalgamation) Act 1884 (47 & 48 Vict. c. clxxxiv).

== Locations ==
- Golspie; Sutherland Railway station; opened 13 April 1868; still open;
- Dunrobin; opened 1 November 1870; became private station for Duke of Sutherland 19 June 1871 but public later; closed 29 November 1965; reopened for locally advertised summer excursions July 1984; formally reopened summers only, 30 June 1985; renamed Dunrobin Castle July 1984; still open;
- Brora; opened 1 November 1870; still open;
- Loth; opened 1 November 1870; closed 13 June 1960;
- West Helmsdale; opened 1 November 1870; closed 19 June 1871;
- Helmsdale; opened 17 May 1871; still open.

Passengers had been picked up and set down at any point during the line's independence prior to May 1871, but this had to be sacrificed then for the benefit of having through traffic.

== The line today ==
The line is still open, being part of the Far North Line.

== Narrow gauge alternative ==
The Times Newspaper carried a report on The Railways of the Future. A part of that was a discussion of the Double Fairlie locomotives on the Ffestiniog Railway.

The Duke of Sutherland said he wished he had known more of the Festiniog Railway six years ago. "I have expended," said His Grace, "about £200,000 in promoting and making railways in the north. Had these lines been constructed on the narrow gauge, and had they in consequence cost only two-thirds of the sum that has been expended on them, I should have obtained a direct return on this large sum which I have laid out for the benefit of my estates and of the people in those remote districts. As it is I shall suffer considerable loss."

== Royal visit ==
On 8 August 2021, Prince Charles, Duke of Rothesay, visited Dunrobin Castle to celebrate the 150th anniversary of the railway.
