= Golspie =

Village in Sutherland, Scotland

Coordinates: 57.973°N 3.9771°W

Golspie: Scottish Gaelic: Goillspidh
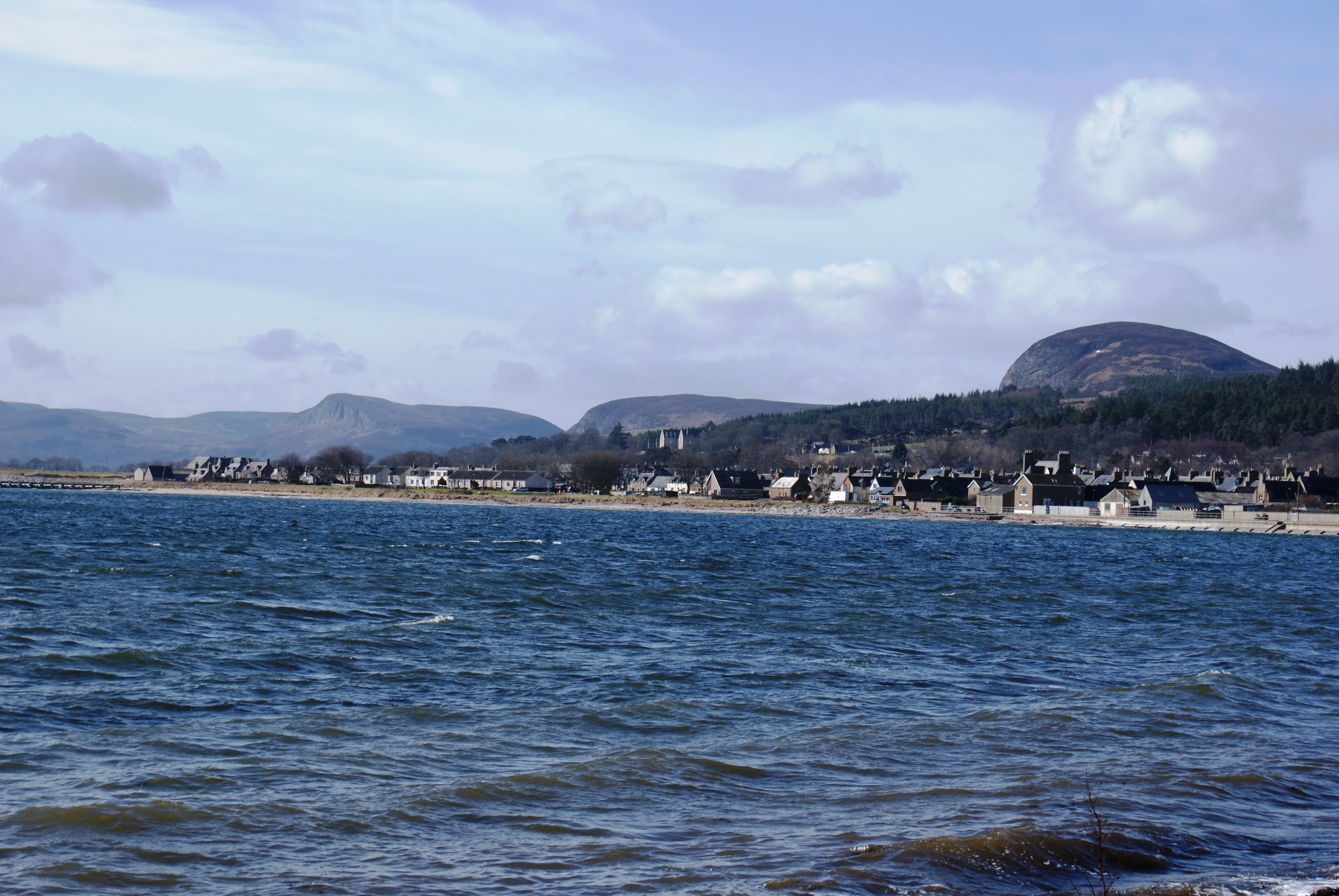
- Golspie coastline with Ben Bhraggie behind the village

- Location within the Sutherland area
- Area: 1.09 km^{2} (0.42 sq mi)
- Population: 1,290 (2020)
  - Density: 1,183/km^{2} (3,060/sq mi)
- OS grid reference: NH832999
  - Edinburgh: 143 mi (230 km)
  - London: 472 mi (760 km)
- Council area: Highland
- Lieutenancy area: Sutherland
- Country: Scotland
- Sovereign state: United Kingdom
- Post town: GOLSPIE
- Postcode district: KW10
- Dialling code: 01408
- Police: Scotland
- Fire: Scottish
- Ambulance: Scottish
- UK Parliament: Caithness, Sutherland and Easter Ross
- Scottish Parliament: Caithness, Sutherland and Ross

Golspie (/ˈɡɒlspi/ GOL-spee, Scottish Gaelic: Goillspidh) is a village and parish in Sutherland, Highland, Scotland, which lies on the North Sea coast in the shadow of Ben Bhraggie. It has a population of around 1,350.

== History ==
The name derives from the Norse for "gully village".

The parish of Golspie was anciently called Kilmaly or Kilmalie, with its parish church at Kirkton, 2 miles (3.2 km) west of the modern village. A chapel dedicated to St Andrew existed at Golspie from at least 1330, and in 1619 the chapel at Golspie was made the parish church, after which the parish became known instead as Golspie and the old church at Kirkton was abandoned. St Andrew's Church was largely rebuilt in 1738.. North of Golspie is an Iron Age broch called Backies Broch.

=== Planned village ===
Much of the modern village of Golspie was laid out in the nineteenth century as a planned village. During a series of visits from the Right Honourable Elizabeth Countess of Sutherland plans were drawn up for the regulations that were written in to future leases, imposing restrictions on the 'tacksmen' with regard to sub-setting and overstocking, and requiring them to adopt improving farming techniques. Consideration was also given to possible development of fishing villages on the east coast, the absence of any safe harbour being the greatest hindrance. Local fishermen used only small, light boats which could be drawn up onto the beach when not in use and this confined them to line fishing close to the shore. The herring fishing in the North Sea (at that time known as the German Ocean) was in the hands of the Dutch, who had a good fleet of decked vessels - the 'Holland Busses' - and it was hoped that some means could be found of developing a similar trade for the benefit of the people of Sutherland.

In one visit (between July and August 1805) the first plans were laid for Golspie village. It was to be based on "the street of the Fishertown of Golspie" and was to consist of houses 50 by 20 feet (15.2 by 6.1 m), each with a croft of 3/4 acre (3,000 m^{2}). The people were to get a 99-year lease for their houses, which they were to build themselves, but the croft ground was to be re-let annually, thus permitting changes in the layout of the village from time to time. In addition to the individual crofts, it was intended to provide common cow pasture.

One improvement was quickly made and that was the building of a little pier or jetty to provide a safe landing place for boats serving Dunrobin. In a letter to her husband the Countess described how she had caused intimation to be given at the Church door that forty men were wanted for the next week at the rate of 1/- a day, to build this jetty, using stones from the beach. The work was supervised by William Pope, who was being considered as a possible person to take charge of the proposed development of the harbours at Culgour and Helmsdale.

In April 1805 the Colonel Campbell submitted for Presbytery's approval a plan for a new schoolhouse in Golspie, the old one having been classed as ruinous the previous year. The plan for the new one was as follows: the school was to be 40 ft (12 m) in length, a kitchen 12 ft (3.7 m) and the master's room 14 ft (4.3 m); the width all through to be 14 ft (4.3 m); the side walls 7.5 ft (2.3 m) high, a roof of grey slate and to be furnished with windows, locks and doors, desks and seats, the total cost being £127:12/-.

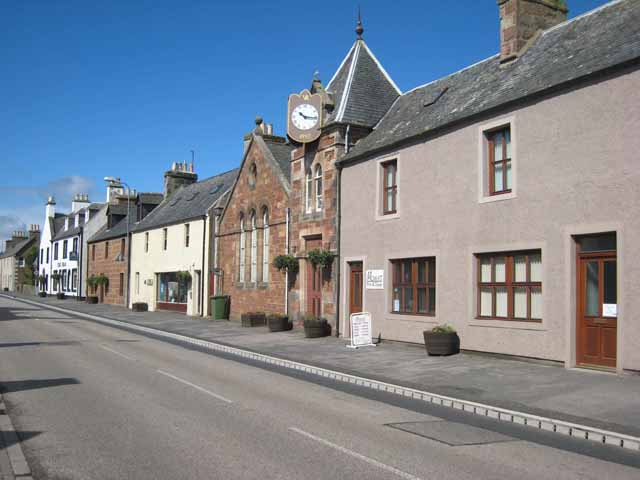
Golspie town centre

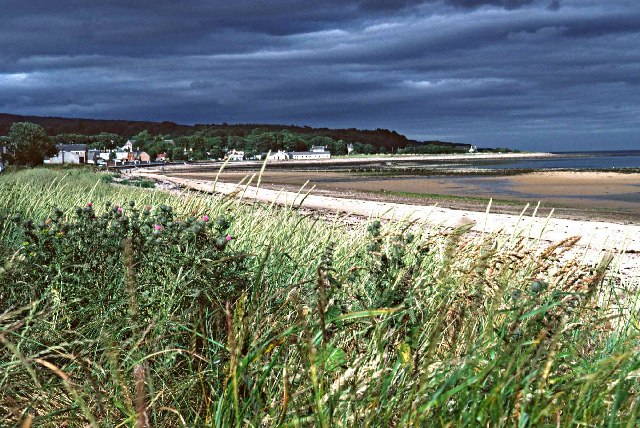
Looking over the beaches to Golspie

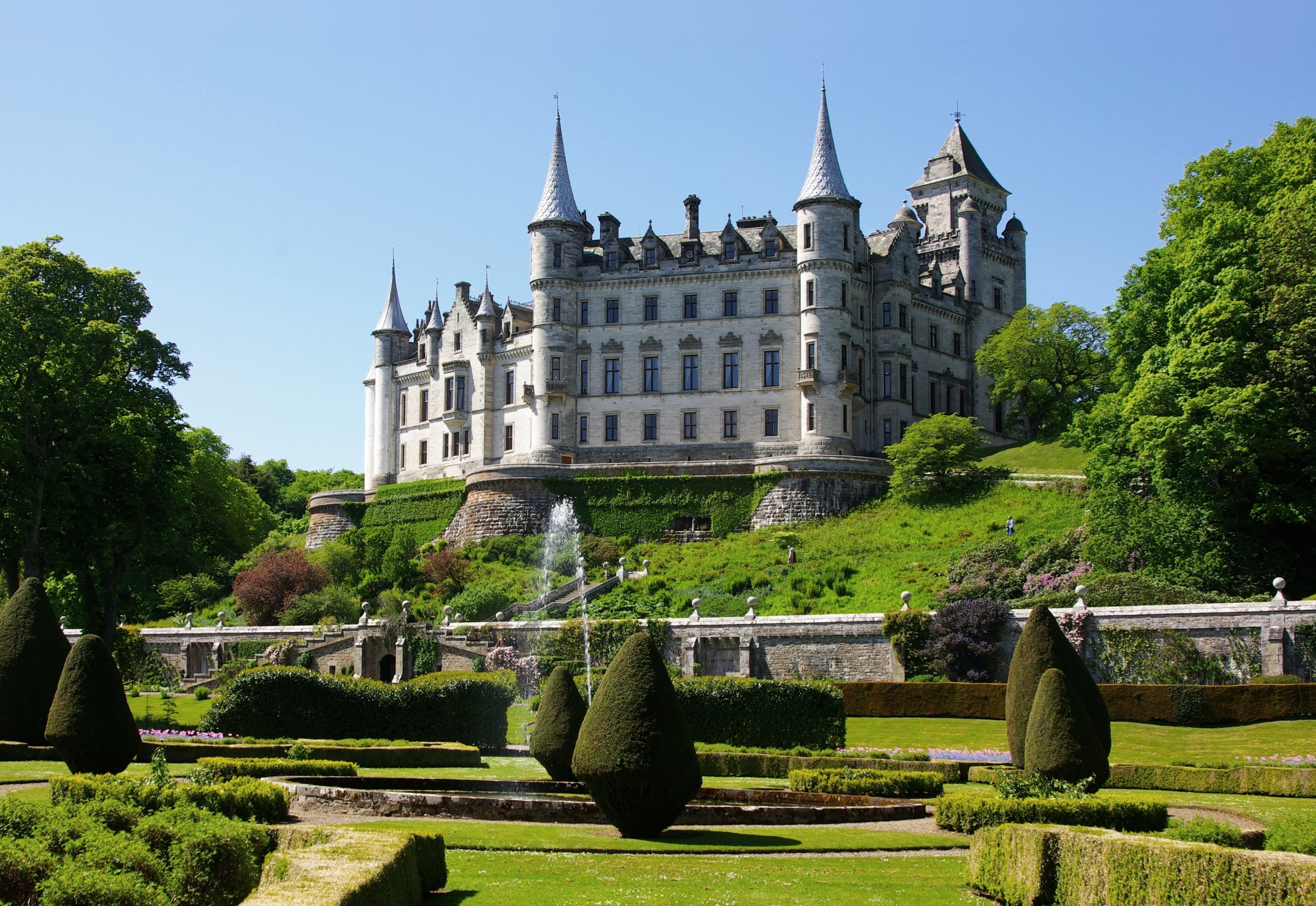
Dunrobin Castle

The Ordnance Survey Six-inch Second Edition Map of Golspie shows its very modest harbour. Fishing ports like this fared badly at the start of the 20th Century, and the development of steam-powered vessels enabled fishermen to travel far from home. In the annual report for 1906, we learn that local "fishermen prosecute the Scottish herring fishing, and this year two crews took part in the herring fishing at Yarmouth".. It is interesting to note that the catch did improve in the years preceding the war.

Fishery Statistics

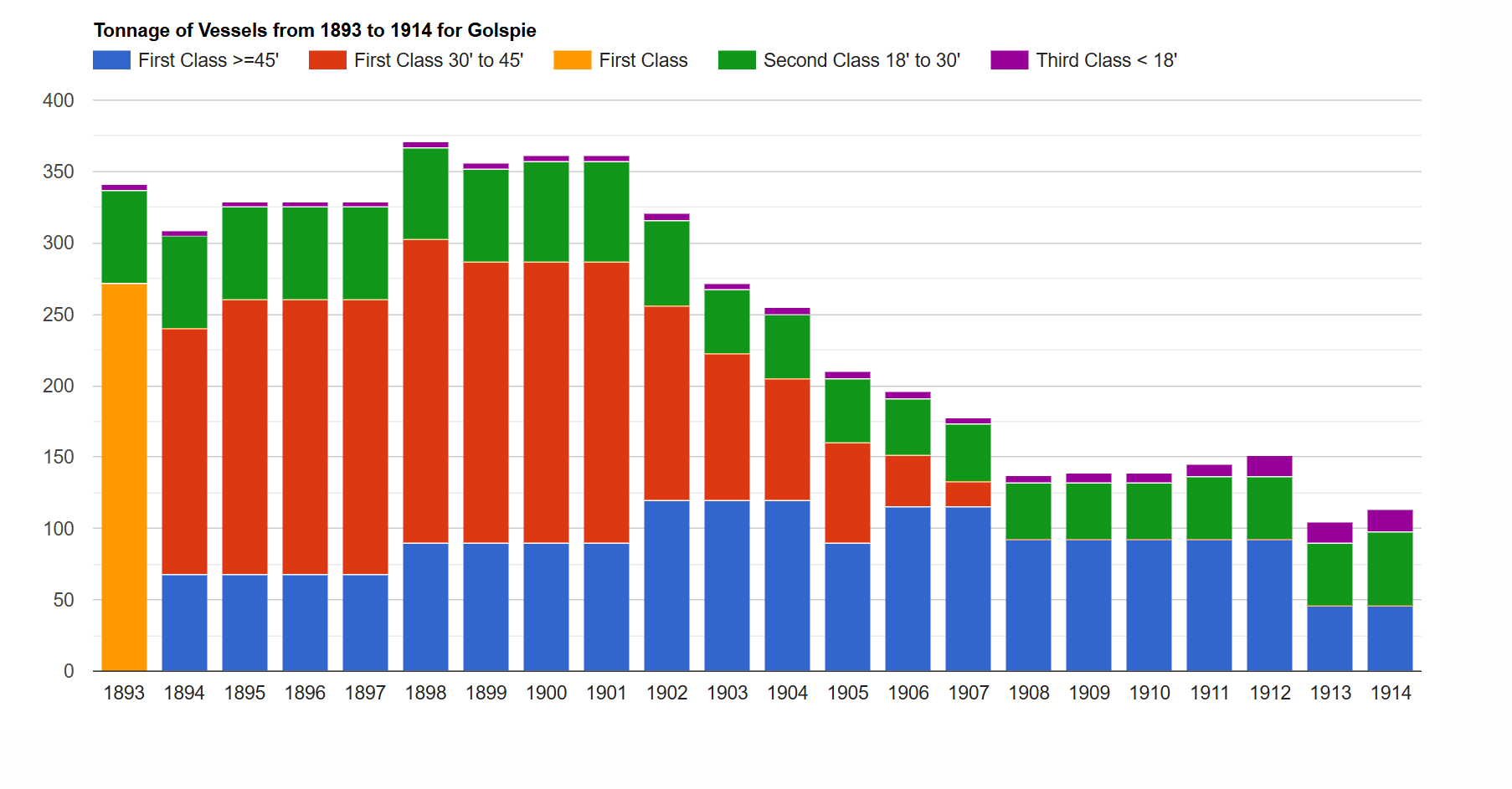
Tonnage of vessels

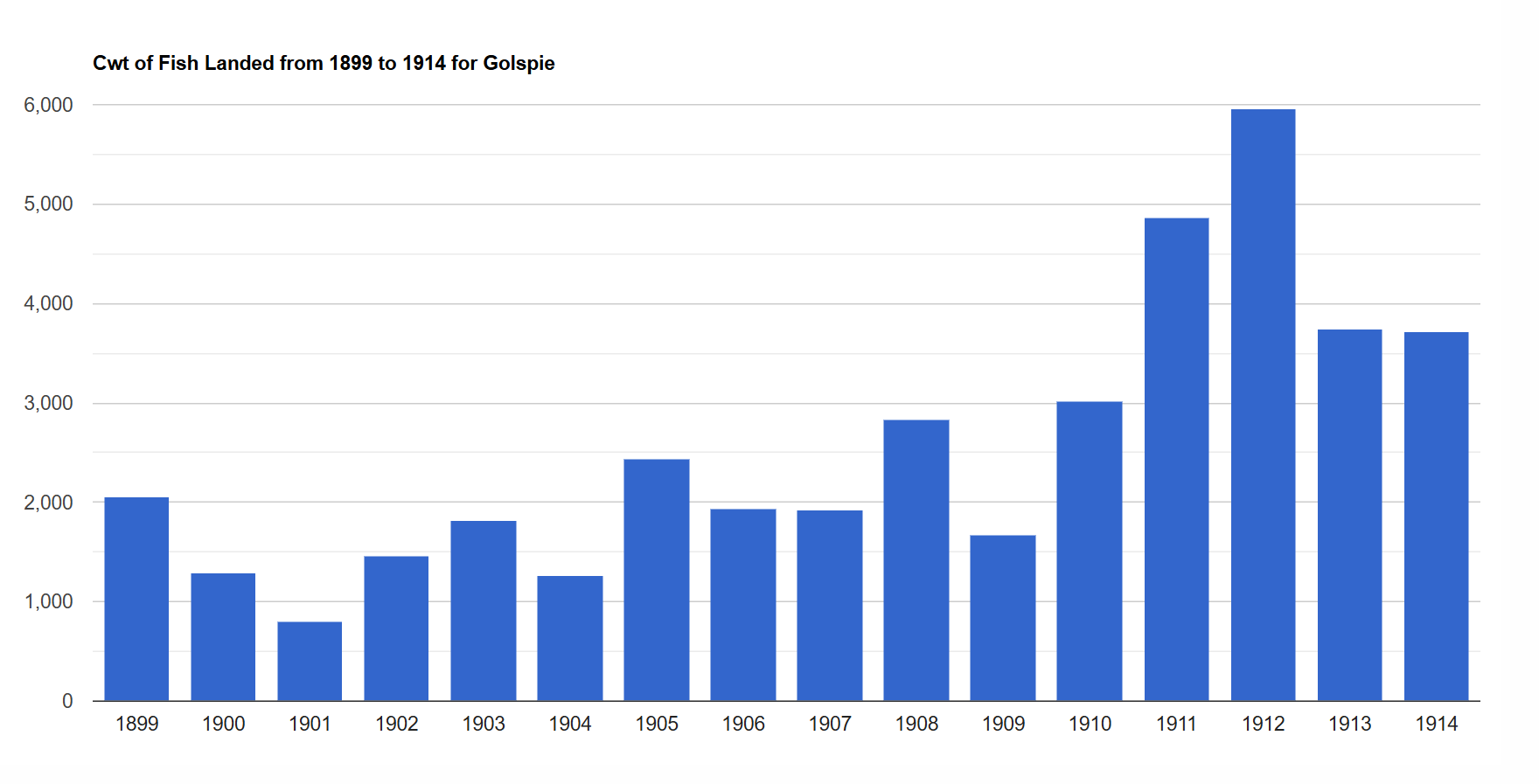
Cwt of fish landed

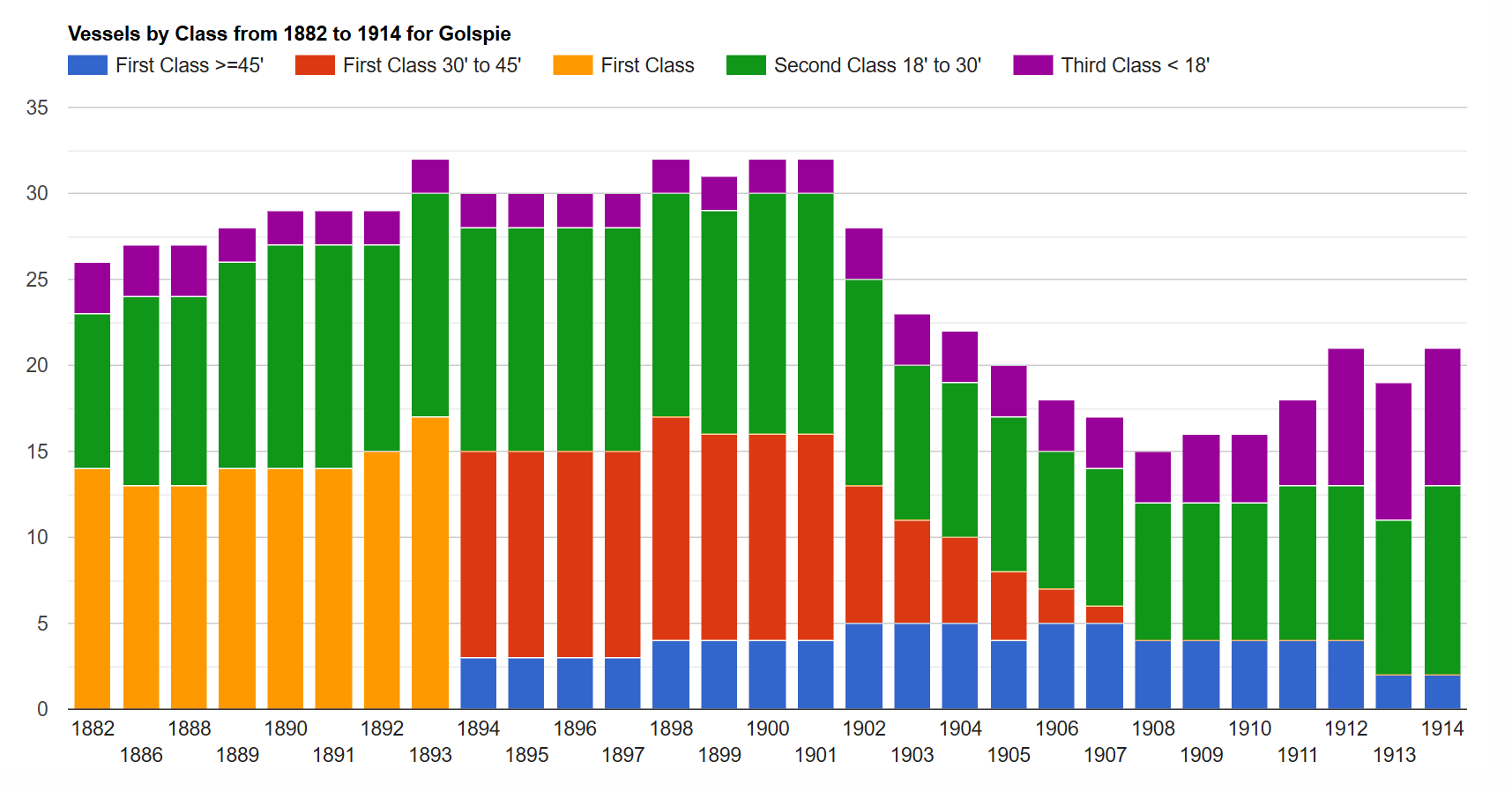
Vessels by class

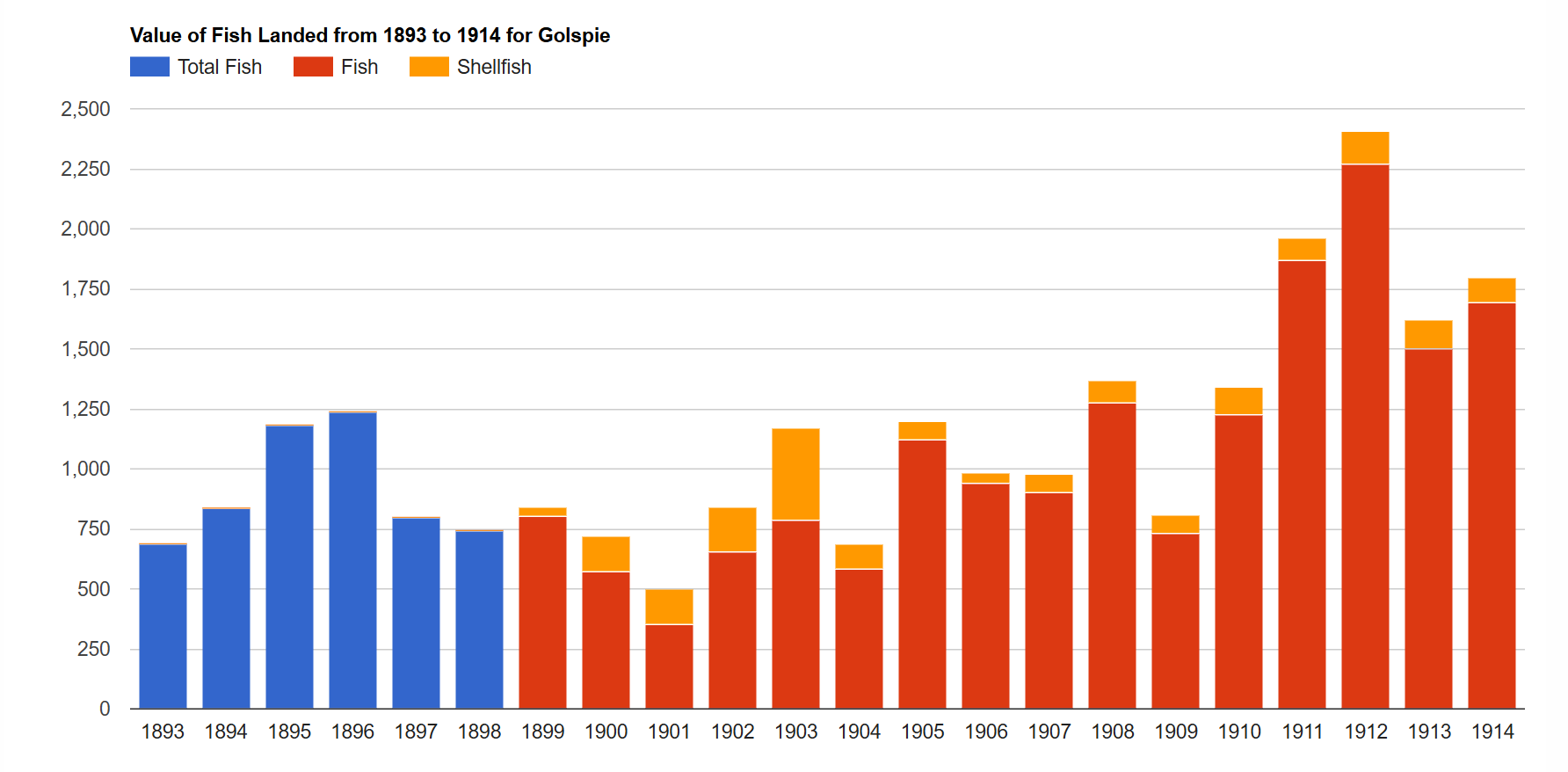
Value (£] of fish landed

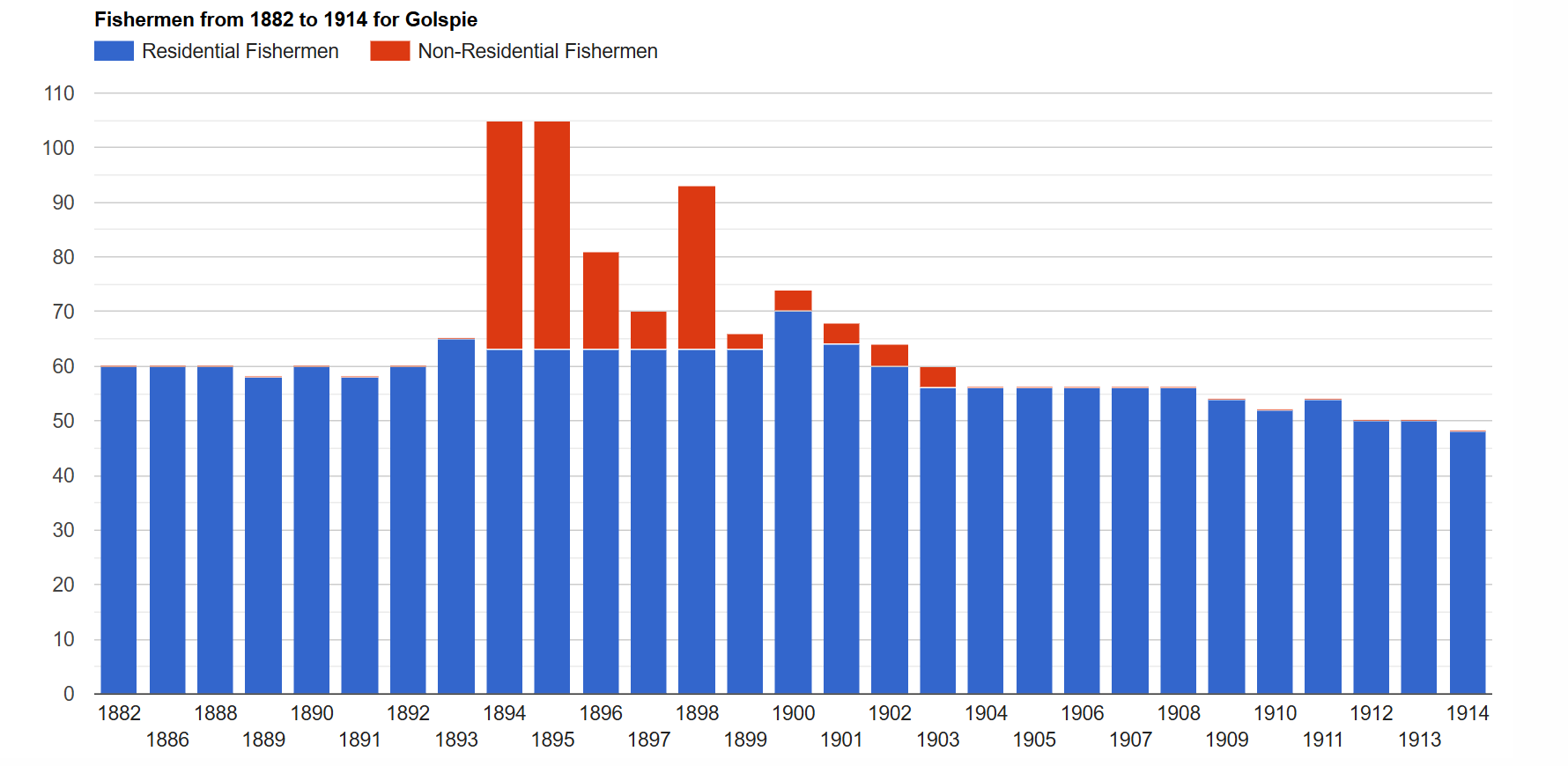
Fishermen

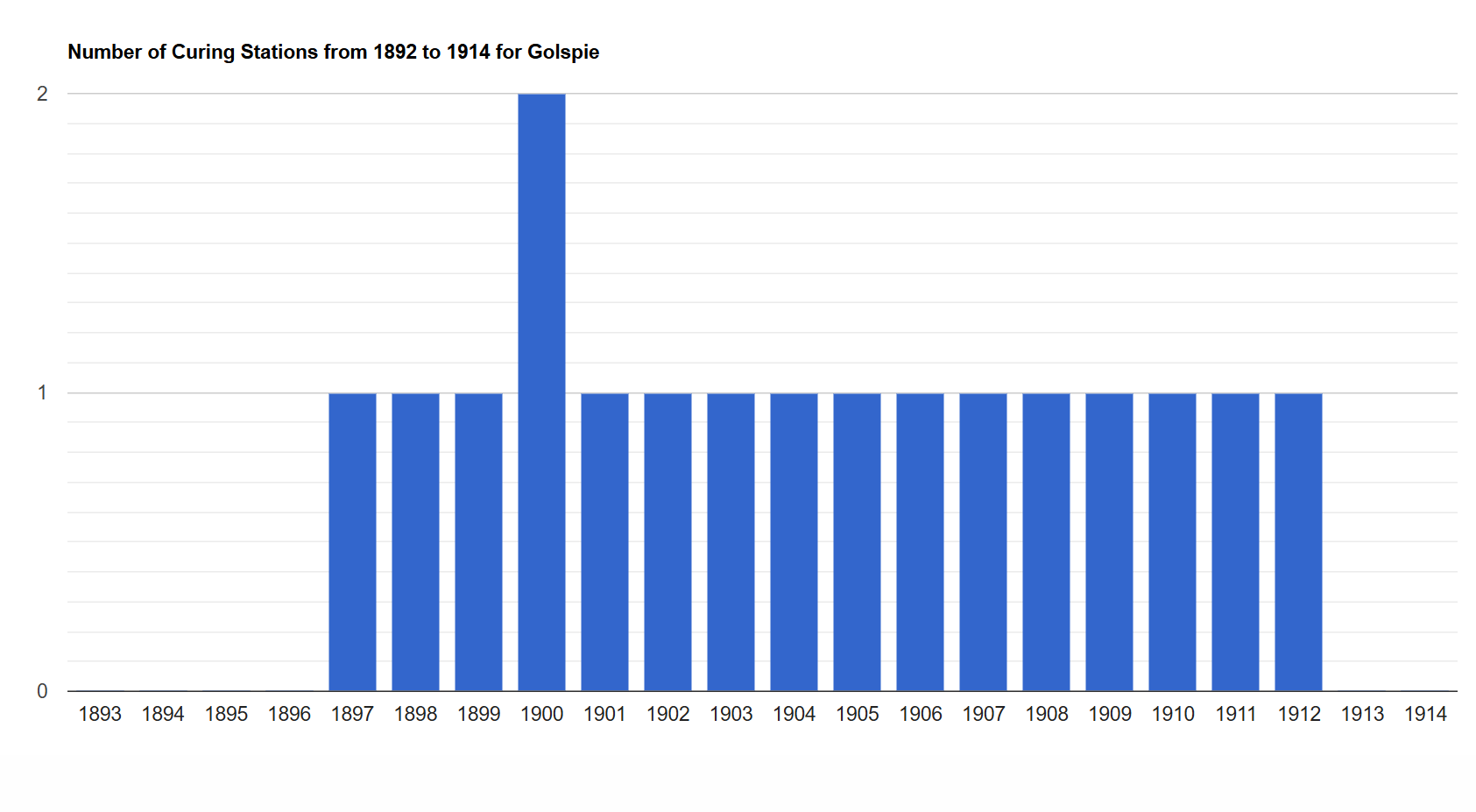
Number of curing stations

== Monuments ==
The two significant monuments associated with Golspie both commemorate controversial figures, given their involvement with the Sutherland Clearances. "The Mannie" on Ben Bhraggie commemorates the First Duke of Sutherland while the memorial fountain in the village commemorates his wife Elizabeth.

== Economy and culture ==
Centred on Loch Fleet, 3 miles (5 km) south of Golspie, is a national nature reserve with wading birds, wildfowl and seals. Osprey, terns and swallows frequent the loch in summer. Rare wild flowers and plants can be seen in nearby Balblair Wood.

There are four hotels, several guesthouses and bed and breakfast premises as well as self-catering cottages. Dunrobin Castle, the seat of Clan Sutherland, is nearby and has falconry displays. There is a static caravan site. The Old Bank Road drill hall was completed in 1892.

Golspie hosted the National Mòd in 1977 and 1995.

The village has a Choral Group, Rotary Club, and dancing classes. At the start of August Golspie Gala Week is held. Among the 100 events staged throughout the week are a car-banger derby, a fancy dress parade, a wheelbarrow race and a parade of massed pipe bands as a finale. Golspie Heritage Society has a permanent home in the former Fisherman's Welcome on Station Road. The IT-equipped public library, open for limited periods four days weekly, is in the Community Centre complex adjoining the High School.

== Hospital ==
There is a small hospital, The Lawson Memorial hospital, located just off the main road to the south of the centre of the village. Among other services, the hospital provides a pain clinic and offers pain intervention procedures as part of the Chronic Pain Management Service for the whole of the northern Highland Region.

== Religion ==
The Church of Scotland and the Free Church of Scotland have well-established congregations, but the Roman Catholic Church and Scottish Episcopal Church worship in nearby Brora.

The parish church is officially St Andrew's Church, and contains the town graveyard.

== Transport ==
Golspie railway station, on the Far North Line, opened in 1874. The converted station building is now a holiday let.

Buses operate about every two hours Mondays-Saturdays and infrequently on Sundays from Golspie to Dornoch, Tain and Inverness in the south and Brora, Helmsdale, Berriedale, Dunbeath, Halkirk, Thurso and Scrabster in the north. These are on route X99 and are operated by Stagecoach Highlands, but tickets can be bought on the Citylink website.

== Sport ==
Golspie has award-winning safe bathing beaches to the north and south of the tidal pier and there is also a public swimming pool in the centre of the village. The Kart Race Track is a mile or two down Ferry Road. The golf course has a mix of links, parkland and heath and there are central facilities for tennis and bowling, football and playing fields. Around Golspie there are opportunities for walking, bird watching and botany study, fossil-hunting and gorges and waterfalls. There is loch and sea angling, as well as sailing and yachting in the bay. In 2006 mountain bike trails were opened on the slopes of Beinn Bhragaidh.

The village's local football team, Golspie Sutherland currently plays in the North Caledonian Football Association, and is the joint most successful team in the league.

== Notable people from Golspie ==
- William Fowler (architect) (1824–1906), who designed a high proportion of the public buildings in Golspie
- Adam Gunn (1872–1935), American athlete, was born in the village
- Lewis Williamson (1989–), Formula Renault driver
- Jimmy Yuill (1956–), Royal Shakespeare Company actor
- Rev James Maxwell Joass (1830–1914), geologist, archaeologist and antiquarian, minister of Golspie from 1866 to 1914
