= List of listed buildings in Dornoch, Highland =

This is a list of listed buildings in the parish of Dornoch in Highland, Scotland.

== List ==
Name	Location	Date Listed	Grid Ref. (Note: Sometimes known as OSGB36, the grid reference (where provided) is based on the British national grid reference system used by the Ordnance Survey. • "Guide to National Grid". Ordnance Survey. • "Get-a-map". Ordnance Survey.)	Geo-coordinates	Notes	LB Number (Note: Historic Environment Scotland assign a unique alphanumeric identifier to each designated site in Scotland, for listed buildings this always begins with "LB", for example "LB12345".)	Image
7 Castle Street The Eagle Hotel				57°52′51″N 4°01′59″W	Category B	24628	Upload another image
Castle Street West Deanery				57°52′49″N 4°01′53″W	Category C(S)	24629	Upload another image
Earl's Cross House				57°53′08″N 4°01′11″W	Category B	24641	Upload Photo
2, 3, 4, 5 Gilchrist Square				57°52′51″N 4°01′46″W	Category B	24643	Upload Photo
High Street Mercat Cross				57°52′50″N 4°01′46″W	Category B	24646	Upload another image
Kennedy Avenue Links House				57°52′45″N 4°01′28″W	Category B	24649	Upload Photo
Skelbo Steading				57°55′40″N 4°02′40″W	Category B	596	Upload Photo
Skibo Castle, and Garden Terraces, Walled Garden and Glasshouses				57°52′27″N 4°08′00″W	Category A	597	Upload another image See more images
Skibo Castle Swimming Pool				57°52′18″N 4°08′06″W	Category B	601	Upload Photo
1 And 2 Castle Street				57°52′51″N 4°02′03″W	Category C(S)	24624	Upload another image
5 And 6 Castle Street				57°52′51″N 4°02′00″W	Category C(S)	24627	Upload another image
Castle Street The Deanery				57°52′49″N 4°01′52″W	Category B	24630	Upload another image
Castle Street Clydesdale Bank				57°52′50″N 4°02′03″W	Category C(S)	24635	Upload another image
Castle Street Old Jail And Former Drill Hall				57°52′47″N 4°01′43″W	Category B	24638	Upload another image
Church Street Free Church Of Scotland, Church Room (Former School), Burial Ground And Gate Piers With Front Retaining Wall				57°52′46″N 4°01′36″W	Category B	24640	Upload Photo
Off High Street Tornaver				57°52′56″N 4°01′43″W	Category B	24648	Upload Photo
Skibo Castle Former Electric House And Private Telephone Exchange (Now Garage) With Pair Dwellings, "Loch Ospisdale East" And "Loch Ospisdale West"				57°52′19″N 4°08′07″W	Category B	600	Upload Photo
Cuthill Farm Cottages				57°51′43″N 4°06′16″W	Category C(S)	606	Upload Photo
Castle Street, Gleann Golliadh				57°52′51″N 4°02′02″W	Category C(S)	24625	Upload another image
Police Station, Castle Street				57°52′46″N 4°01′41″W	Category C(S)	24639	Upload another image
Nos 1, 2 And 3 High Street Dornoch Bakery (Nos 1 And 2) And Swyn-Y-Coed				57°52′51″N 4°01′51″W	Category B	24647	Upload Photo
Clashmore Carnegie Hall				57°52′42″N 4°06′53″W	Category B	602	Upload Photo
Evelix Old Bridge Over River Evelix				57°53′11″N 4°04′44″W	Category B	609	Upload Photo
Meikle Ferry Pier				57°51′14″N 4°08′37″W	Category C(S)	610	Upload another image See more images
Castle Street The White House				57°52′49″N 4°01′51″W	Category C(S)	24631	Upload another image
Castle Street Fountain				57°52′48″N 4°01′48″W	Category B	24633	Upload another image
Castle Street County Buildings And Courthouse				57°52′47″N 4°01′46″W	Category B	24637	Upload another image
Skibo Castle Dairy And Dairy House				57°52′32″N 4°07′51″W	Category B	599	Upload Photo
Station Road St Michael's Well				57°53′00″N 4°01′38″W	Category C(S)	24652	Upload Photo
Castle Street Dornoch Castle (Castle Hotel) And Garden Wall				57°52′47″N 4°01′48″W	Category B	24636	Upload another image
Skibo Castle Bridge Spanning Outfall Of Lake Ospidale				57°52′13″N 4°08′09″W	Category C(S)	598	Upload Photo
Embo House				57°54′13″N 4°00′41″W	Category A	608	Upload another image
Skelbo Castle And House Within Castle Enclosure				57°55′47″N 4°02′28″W	Category B	611	Upload Photo
Station Road St Michaels				57°52′50″N 4°01′40″W	Category B	24651	Upload another image
2 And 3 Argyle Street				57°52′49″N 4°01′33″W	Category C(S)	24623	Upload Photo
6 And 7 Gilchrist Square				57°52′52″N 4°01′44″W	Category B	24644	Upload Photo
Station Road Netherwood				57°52′54″N 4°01′40″W	Category B	24650	Upload Photo
Two K6 Telephone Kiosks In The Square				57°52′48″N 4°01′43″W	Category B	51108	Upload Photo
Dornoch Cathedral and Walled Grave Yard. (Cathedral Of St. Mary And St Gilbert. Church Of Scotland Parish Church), Castle Street				57°52′50″N 4°01′48″W	Category A	24632	Upload another image See more images
Castle Street Old Post Office (Tourist Office)				57°52′48″N 4°01′42″W	Category B	24634	Upload Photo
8 Gilchrist Square				57°52′52″N 4°01′43″W	Category B	24645	Upload Photo
Cuthill Farmhouse				57°51′42″N 4°06′18″W	Category B	605	Upload Photo
4 Castle Street				57°52′51″N 4°02′02″W	Category C(S)	24626	Upload another image
1 Gilchrist Square				57°52′51″N 4°01′46″W	Category B	24642	Upload Photo
Clashmore Oakfield				57°52′41″N 4°06′56″W	Category B	603	Upload Photo
Coul Farmhouse				57°55′12″N 4°00′40″W	Category B	604	Upload Photo
Cyderhall Farmhouse				57°52′10″N 4°05′44″W	Category B	607	Upload Photo

== Key ==
The scheme for classifying buildings in Scotland is:

- Category A: "buildings of national or international importance, either architectural or historic; or fine, little-altered examples of some particular period, style or building type."
- Category B: "buildings of regional or more than local importance; or major examples of some particular period, style or building type, which may have been altered."
- Category C: "buildings of local importance; lesser examples of any period, style, or building type, as originally constructed or moderately altered; and simple traditional buildings which group well with other listed buildings."

In March 2016 there were 47,288 listed buildings in Scotland. Of these, 8% were Category A, and 50% were Category B, with the remaining 42% being Category C.

== See also ==
- List of listed buildings in Highland
- Skibo Castle
