= Margaret Davidson (suffragist) =

Scottish educator, nurse and girl guide leader (1879–1978)

- Born: 16 August 1879
- Died: 16 February 1978 (aged 98)
- Education: Modern Languages, St. Andrews University (graduation date unknown)
- Organization: National Union of Women's Suffrage Societies
- Known for: Leading Dornoch Scotland branch of suffragists society, working as volunteer nurse with Scottish Women's Hospitals for Foreign Service, early Girl Guide Leader

Margaret Charlotte Davidson (1879–1978) was a modern languages teacher in Dornoch, Sutherland in the Scottish Highlands.

She was a leader in the National Union of Women's Suffrage Societies (NUWSS); a volunteer nurse with the Scottish Women's Hospital in France during World War One; and an early Girl Guide Leader in her home town.

She is one of the few suffrage activists from this area of Scotland for whom there are historical records.

== Biography and early career ==
Born on 18 August 1879 in a family of teachers (both of her parents and two of her mother's sisters were teachers), Davidson attended St. Andrew's University, along with her younger sister, until 1902. She became a Modern Languages teacher, first in Dornoch's Burgh School, Schoolhill in 1905, and later moved with the institution to the new Dornoch Academy in 1913 (now the primary school).

== Suffrage movement ==
Davidson became the first Secretary of the Dornoch branch of National Union of Women's Suffrage Societies (NUWSS) in 1912. The branch was visited by leaders of the Scottish Federation of National Union of Women's Suffrage Societies in 1913; and it grew to over 60 members. Members also protested during the 1911 Census, by not participating in the enumeration of members of the households, because they were unable to vote.

Dornoch also attracted the attention of the more militant Women's Social and Political Union (WSPU) as an area famous for its links golf courses, especially the Royal Dornoch Golf Club, which was in the 1910s a male-only club. In 1912 the suffragettes Lilias Mitchell and Elsie Howey attacked Prime Minister Asquith and Home Secretary Reginald McKenna on this course. The following year, a local suffragette, Miss Gibson, who lived at a house near the course called 'Briarfield', approached the Prime Minister again when he was out on the course and knocked off his hat. She was escorted away by Mr. Ryle, Club Captain and Mr. McKenna, reportedly still smiling.

== Volunteer war nurse (Scottish Women's Hospitals) ==
In May 1915, Davidson gave up her teaching job to volunteer as an orderly, then as a nurse, to the wounded at the battlefront, in the Scottish Women's Hospital, at Royaumont in France. These hospitals were founded by Dr. Elsie Inglis, a fellow suffragist, with financial support from NUWSS members and from private sources. Davidson continuously served there 'under the thunder and boom of the great guns' until 29 August 1917.

Nurse Davidson is listed on the First World War Roll of Honour, placed in the Dornoch Cathedral entrance porch.

== Community leader ==
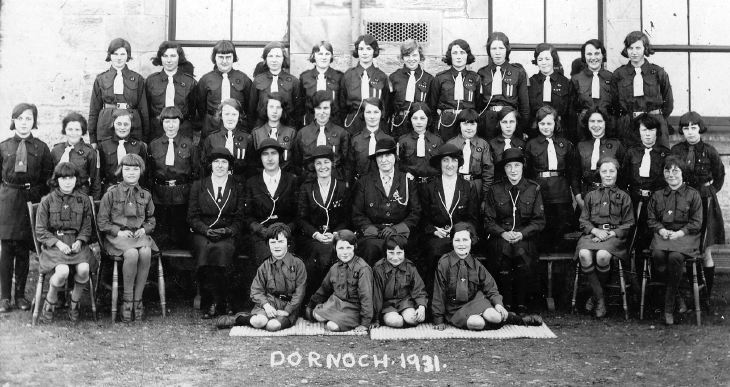
1931 Dornoch Guides

After the war, Davidson returned to her teaching career in Dornoch and was eventually promoted to Head of Subject (Modern Languages). She continued to act as an invigilator for examinations at her former school, for many years after retiring in 1945.

Davidson and her friend Amaryllis Edith Hacon, who had volunteered with her at the Scottish Women's Hospital at Royaumont, took part in a 1928 tercentary Dornoch Pageant. The event marked the granting of the Royal Charter to the Burgh of Dornoch by Charles I in 1628. Both women became Girl Guides leaders in the town in 1931 and were integral to the development of the movement in Dornoch and Sutherland.

Davidson continued to be active in the local community raising funds for wounded soldiers and hospitals.

She died in 1978, aged 98.

== Connection with Amaryllis Edith Hacon ==
Davidson lived in a house called 'Oversteps', which is now a care home. Oversteps was the home of fellow suffragist and young widow Amaryllis Edith Hacon, who had been a society 'hostess' and friend of artists Toulouse Lautrec and Charles Condor. Mrs Hacon's earlier circle included Oscar Wilde, Aubrey Beardsley and Arthur Symons, a British author whose book The Life of Lucy Newcombe was allegedly based on her early life. Hacon's home was also where Prime Minister H. H. Asquith resided on his annual holidays in Scotland in 1912.

Davidson was later a witness at Hacon's second marriage in 1918 to Canadian soldier William Robichaud, whom they had met whilst serving in France. While Davidson is listed on First World War Roll of Honour, Hacon's name does not appear on the brass plaque as she was a Roman Catholic.
