= County Offices, Golspie =

Municipal building in Golspie, Scotland

County Offices
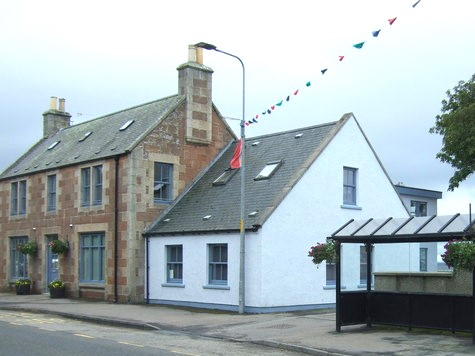
- The building in 2016

- Shown in Sutherland
- 57.9750°N 3.9707°W
- Location: Main Street, Golspie

History
- Built: 1892

Site notes
- Architectural style: Victorian style

County Offices is a former municipal building on Main Street in Golspie in Scotland. The building, which used to be the headquarters of Sutherland County Council, is now divided into seven residential properties known as 1-7 The Old Post Office.

== History ==
In the 18th and 19th centuries, the county town of Sutherland was Dornoch; it was home to the Dornoch Sheriff Court (also known as County Buildings) and to Dornoch Cathedral. At that time, Golspie was regarded as no more than a holiday village. However, by the 20th century, Brora and Golspie were the more significant population centres.

In 1890 county councils were established in each county of Scotland under the Local Government (Scotland) Act 1889. It also directed that the existing clerk to each county's Commissioners of Supply should automatically become the first clerk to the county council. Whilst the Sutherland commissioners met at the County Buildings in Dornoch, their clerk at the time, George Tait, was based in Golspie. His offices therefore became the county council's first offices. The first provisional meeting of the council was held on 13 February 1890 at the County Buildings in Dornoch, but it was decided that a more accessible location was needed for the council's meetings. Although Dornoch was the county's only burgh, it was in the extreme south-eastern corner of the county and lay some seven miles from its then nearest railway station at The Mound. The council's first official meeting was held on 22 May 1890 at Bonar Bridge, and subsequent meetings were generally held at various premises in Lairg, with occasional meetings in other places, including Dornoch, Golspie, Brora and Lochinver.

In 1892 a new post office for Golspie was completed on the south-eastern side of the main street in Golspie, and from the outset part of the building served as the main administrative offices for the county council's staff. The design involved a symmetrical main frontage of three bays facing onto Main Street. The central bay featured a doorway with a rectangular fanlight and a single sash window on the first floor. The outer bays were fenestrated by tri-partite casement windows on the ground floor and by bi-partite windows on the first floor.

Around 1910 the post office moved to a new building next door, after which the county council expanded to take over the rest of the 1892 building, which became known as the County Offices. As the responsibilities of the county council grew, a modern extension was erected at the rear.

The County Offices did not include a council chamber, and throughout the county council's existence meetings were held in various hired premises across the county, usually in Lairg. In 1938 the council decided to combine its offices and meeting place in a new building at Dornoch, but following the outbreak of the Second World War the scheme was not implemented. In 1966 the council resolved to build itself a new headquarters in Lairg, but that scheme was abandoned due to budget pressures and protests from the council's staff, most of whom lived in the Golspie and Brora area.

After the abolition of Sutherland County Council in 1975, the County Offices in Golspie served as the main offices of Sutherland District Council, before passing to the Highland Council when local government was reorganised into single-tier council areas in 1996. After the council acquired and refurbished Drummuie between August 2006 and March 2008, the building on Main Street became surplus to requirements, was sold and subsequently converted into seven flats, called 1–7 The Old Post Office, one of which (number 6) is used as holiday accommodation.
