= Samuel Chew =

Samuel Chew may refer to:

- Samuel Chew (justice) (1693–1743), physician, Chief Justice of colonial Delaware
- Samuel Chew (captain) (1750–1778), American officer in the Continental Navy
- Samuel Claggett Chew (1888–1960), American literary scholar
- Sam Chew Jr., American actor
