= Drummuie =

Former school in Golspie, Scotland

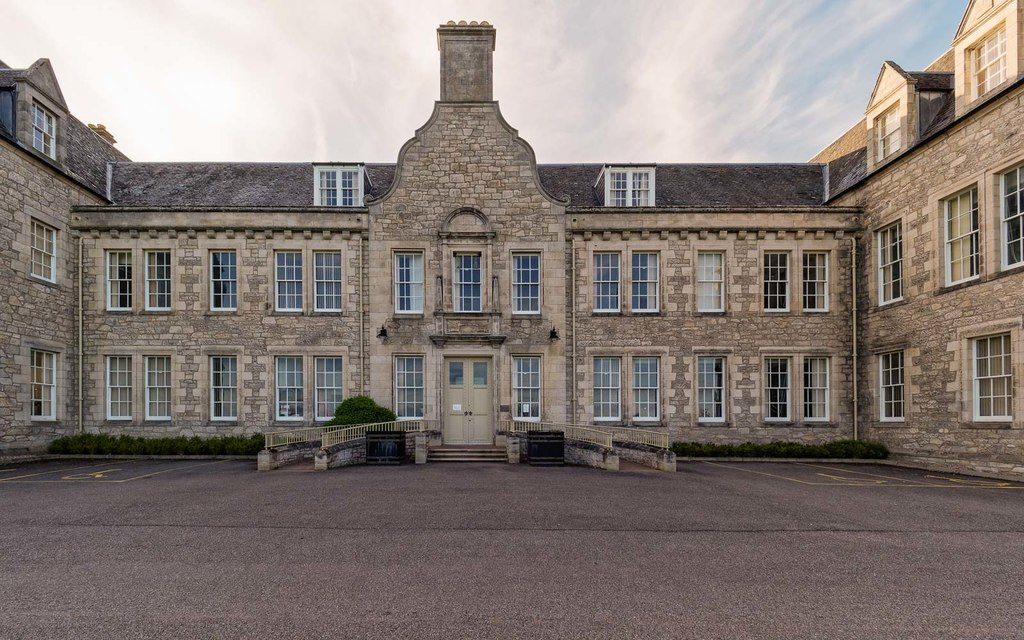
- The Highland Council offices at Drummuie

- Shown in Highland
- 57.9697°N 4.0001°W
- Location: Drummuie Terrace, Golspie

History
- Built: 1904

Site notes
- Architect(s): John More Dick Peddie and George Washington Browne
- Architectural style: Renaissance Revival style

Listed Building – Category B
- Official name: Drummuie, Golspie Technical School
- Designated: 7 March 1984
- Reference no.: LB7065

Drummuie, formerly Golspie Technical School, is a municipal structure in Drummuie Terrace, Golspie, Highland, Scotland. The complex, which served as a school from 1903 to 2000 and has been used since 2008 as offices for the Highland Council, is a Category B listed building.

== History ==
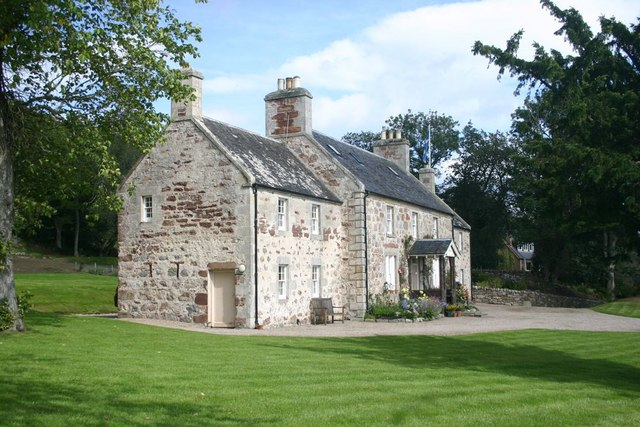
Drummuie House

The Drummuie estate has its origins in Drummuie House, which was commissioned by a veteran of the Napoleonic Wars, Captain Robert Sutherland, and was completed in 1809. In the early 20th century, Millicent Leveson-Gower, Duchess of Sutherland decided to commission a technical school for the education of the sons of local crofters. Her husband, Cromartie Sutherland-Leveson-Gower, 4th Duke of Sutherland donated the land; the major contributors to the cost of construction were The Duke of Sutherland and the American businessman, Andrew Carnegie. The site they selected was just to the west of Drummuie House.

The foundation stone for the new building was laid by Alexander Bruce, 6th Lord Balfour of Burleigh in 1903. It was designed by John More Dick Peddie and George Washington Browne in the Renaissance Revival style, built in rubble masonry and was officially opened on 3 October 1904. The design involved a symmetrical main frontage of fifteen bays facing south towards the A9 road with the end bays projected forward as pavilions. The main frontage incorporated a three-bay central section which was slightly projected forward and featured a doorway with an architrave surmounted by a panel inscribed with the words "Let there be light". The panel was supported by brackets and flanked by obelisks. On the first floor, there was a central window flanked by Doric order pilasters supporting an entablature inscribed "MFS 1903" which was surmounted by a round headed hood mould. The inscription MFS recalled the main benefactor, Millicent Fanny Sutherland. The main frontage was fenestrated on both floors by sash windows. The end bays, which incorporated an extra storey, were fenestrated by three sash windows on the ground floor and by single sash windows on the first and second floors. At roof level, the three-bay central section was surmounted by a stepped gable with a central stack at the apex. Meanwhile, Dummuie House was converted for use as the home of the headmaster of the technical school.

The school merged with nearby Golspie High School around 1965, with the building then serving as the High School's technical annex. Ownership of the site passed to the Highland Regional Council on local government reorganisation in 1975, which in turn was replaced by the Highland Council in 1996. Meanwhile, Drummuie House became surplus to requirements and was acquired by Dr George Murray.

The school building closed in 2000 on the completion of a new technical wing at the main High School site.

The building subsequently deteriorated. Between August 2006 and March 2008, it was the subject of an extensive programme of refurbishment works to replace the Highland Council's offices in the area, notably including the former offices of Sutherland County Council on Main Street in Golspie. The works, which included external repairs, the refurbishment of the interior and the landscaping of the site, were carried out by Morrison Construction at a cost of £3.5 million to a design by Colin Armstrong Associates. It was reported that a total of about £5 million was spent on the project.

The building was officially re-opened as council offices on 3 October 2008.

== See also ==
- List of listed buildings in Golspie, Highland
