= Edith Hacon =

Scottish suffragist (1875–1952)

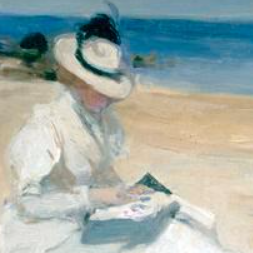
- "Mrs Amaryllis Robichaud" – detail of an 1896 painting by Charles Conder
- Born: Edith Catherine Mary Dolores Broadbent; 1875
- Died: 25 August 1952 (aged 76–77)
- Other names: Ryllis Llewellyn Hacon; Edith Catherine Robichaud; and earlier in her life Muriel Broadbent
- Organization: National Union of Women's Suffrage Societies
- Known for: Suffragist, World War One nursing service volunteer, socialite
- Spouse: William Llewellyn Hacon
- Awards: Silver Medaille des Epidemics (France); British War Medal; British Victory Medal

Edith Hacon (1875 – 25 August 1952), also known as Rhyllis Llewellyn Hacon, later Mrs "Amaryllis" Robichaud, was an international socialite, an artists' model and a leading Scottish suffragist. She was vice-president of the Dornoch branch of the National Union of Women's Suffrage Societies and president of the Women's Liberal Association. During the First World War she volunteered with the Scottish Women's Hospitals in France for three years and was awarded a silver Medaille des Epidemics, the British War Medal and Victory Medal. She would later take a key role in the development of Girl Guiding as an early leader in Dornoch in the 1930s.

== Biography and early life ==
Edith Catherine Mary Dolores Broadbent was born in 1875 to John Broadbent and Margaret Broadbent, née Rayment. Her parents died when she was a young woman. Little is known about Edith's early life and her original birth certificate has not been traced.

Edith became a socialite in London in her 20s when she worked as a model for Selwyn Image, Charles Shannon and other artists and used the alias 'Amaryllis'. Her portrait The Lady with the Green Fan (Portrait of Mrs Hacon) may be the one mentioned in a poem by W. B. Yeats, The Municipal Gallery Revisited, in which he calls her ‘beautiful and gentle in her Venetian way.' The portrait is held in the collection of the Hugh Lane Gallery in Dublin. Her social circle included Oscar Wilde, Aubrey Beardsley, Selwyn Image, Herbert Horne and international visitors, such as Paul Verlaine.

Edith was also called 'Muriel' in the poems of Arthur Symons. Symons wrote Edith's (partly fantasy) life story in 'The Life of Lucy Newcome', with extracts published in The Savoy. The fictional Lucy Newcome was brought up in an affluent home but following the death of her parents lived with an aunt and uncle. She was assaulted by her elder cousin and was turned out of their house because she was pregnant. The baby later died. It is not clear whether this fictional narrative reflects Edith's experience in her early life. 'Muriel' also appeared in a poem To Muriel: At the Opera (14 November 1892) published in his collection London Nights.

Edith married barrister and art collector, and investor in the Vale Press, William Llewellyn Hacon and became known as Rhyllis Llewellyn Hacon. At this point in her life she converted to Roman Catholicism.

== Life in Dornoch before the First World War ==
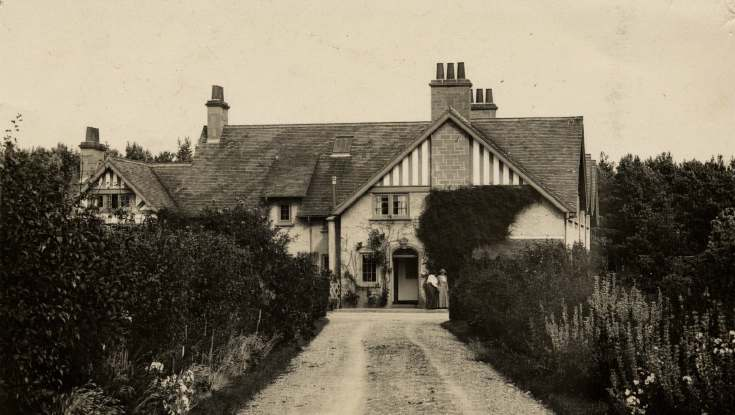
1910 picture of Oversteps in Dornoch - Hacon and Davidson are thought to be in the picture

Due to her husband's interest in golf, the couple built a home in Dornoch, Sutherland called Oversteps an Arts and Crafts style house (now a nursing home).

It has been suggested that Edith became a 'society hostess' at this point in her life. Artist Charles Conder came to Dornoch and painted Edith's portrait in 1896, 'On the Shore at Dornoch' which is in Aberdeen Art Gallery. Another portrait (entitled 'The lady with the green fan (portrait or Mrs Hacon)' ) was painted by Charles Haslewood Shannon; it hangs in Dublin City Gallery, and was referred to in a poem by W. B. Yeats: called The Municipal Gallery Revisited. Prime Minister H. H. Asquith resided at Oversteps on his annual holiday in Scotland in 1912. The Llewellyn Hacons also had a home in Dieppe where they hosted artist Toulouse Lautrec.

After her husband's death in 1910, when Edith was only 36 years old, she became involved in charitable work in Shetland in 1912–13 with 'Irish fisher girls' who were supported by the Catholic church in the 'gutting' season. This involved travelling with the fishing fleet and contributing to building a rest home called 'The White Rest'.

Edith also helped fund the Catholic Church in Lerwick, and the brass tabernacle there is inscribed 'In Memory of Llewellyn Hacon'.

== Suffragist leadership ==
In 1912, Edith was a member and president of the Women's Liberal Association at Dornoch, and they hosted a tour of leaders from the Scottish women's organisations, encouraging local support for the women's suffrage cause. Prime Minister H. H. Asquith resided at Oversteps on his golfing holiday in Dornoch in 1912 and probably 1913, when suffragettes disturbed him while playing both years.

In 1914, Hacon became vice-president of the Dornoch National Union of Women's Suffrage Societies (NUWSS) branch and she was able to report that half of the electors had signed their petition in support of women's suffrage, whilst campaigning at the Northern Burghs by-election that year. Her friend Margaret Davidson, a teacher, was the first secretary of the branch and she lived at Oversteps with Edith before the First World War.

The NUWSS membership had grown to 60 members under her leadership and had regular visiting speakers from the national groups.

== Role in war nursing service (Scottish Women's Hospitals) ==
At the start of the First World War, Hacon volunteered with Margaret Davidson for a role in Dr. Elsie Inglis's WW1 Scottish Women's Hospital at Royaumont. She began as an orderly but 'Mrs. Hacon' became the housekeeper and called herself 'Head of Char'. Hacon supervised the kitchen, and seamstress work, making and repairing uniforms and organised hockey matches and tea to keep up morale, and made a rag doll for one of the wounded soldiers. Hacon served for three years, and was awarded a Silver Medal "Medaille des Epidemics" by the French Government, and both the British War Medal and Victory Medal.

As a Roman Catholic, Hacon was not included in the Dornoch Cathedral World War One Roll of Honour plaque as was her friend Margaret Davidson.

== Life after the First World War ==
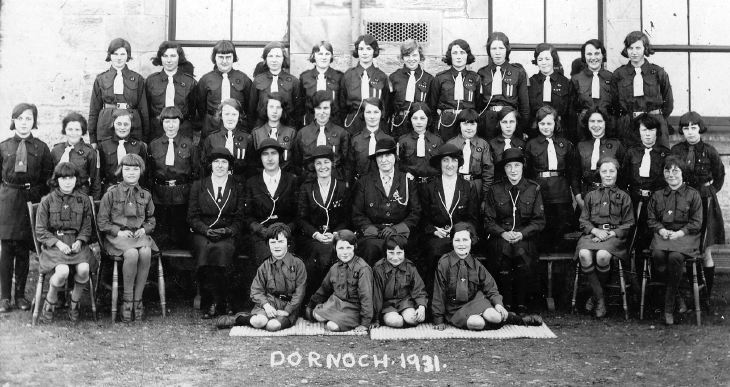
1931– Dornoch Guides – Hacon is 6th from the left of the group leaders and her friend Miss Davidson is beside her.

In 1918, Hacon married a Canadian forester Private William Robichaud in the Canadian Forestry Corps France; he later became a timber merchant. Her friend Margaret Davidson was a witness at their wedding. Edith and William couple later adopted two children.

Hacon and Davidson took part in the 1928 tercentenary Dornoch Pageant marking the granting of the Royal charter to the Burgh of Dornoch by Charles I in 1628.

They also both became Girl Guide leaders in 1931 and were integral to the development of the movement in Dornoch and Sutherland. According to the Northern Times and Weekly Journal for Sutherland, Hacon had started the guides in Dornoch in 1911, and resumed her service to them after the war, serving as District Commissioner and president of the local branch. Only a few years before her death, the guides were all invited to her cottage, where they told stories and had a sing-song, parting with "Taps"

Hacon died on 28 August 1952 in Glasgow but is buried next to William Llewellyn Hacon in Dornoch.
