= Dornoch Sheriff Court =

Judicial building in Dornoch, Scotland

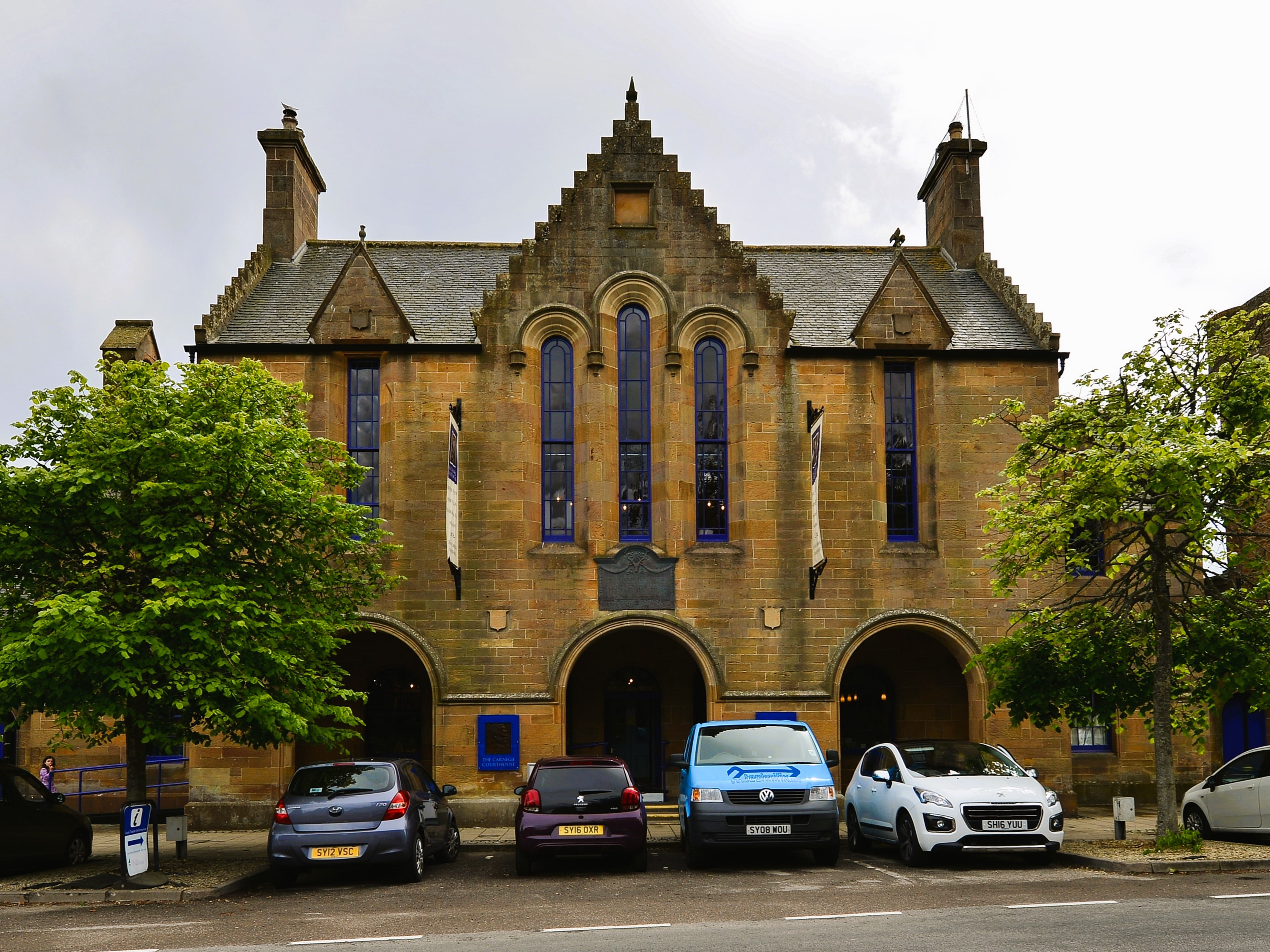
- The building in 2016

- Shown in Sutherland
- 57.8797°N 4.0294°W
- Location: Castle Street, Dornoch

History
- Built: 1850

Site notes
- Architect: Thomas Brown
- Architectural style: Gothic Tudor Revival style

Listed Building – Category B
- Official name: Former Dornoch County Buildings and Court House, Castle Street, Dornoch
- Designated: 18 March 1971
- Reference no.: LB24637

Dornoch Sheriff Court, also known as County Buildings, is a former judicial building on Castle Street in Dornoch in Scotland. The building, which is now used as shops, is a Category B listed building.

== History ==
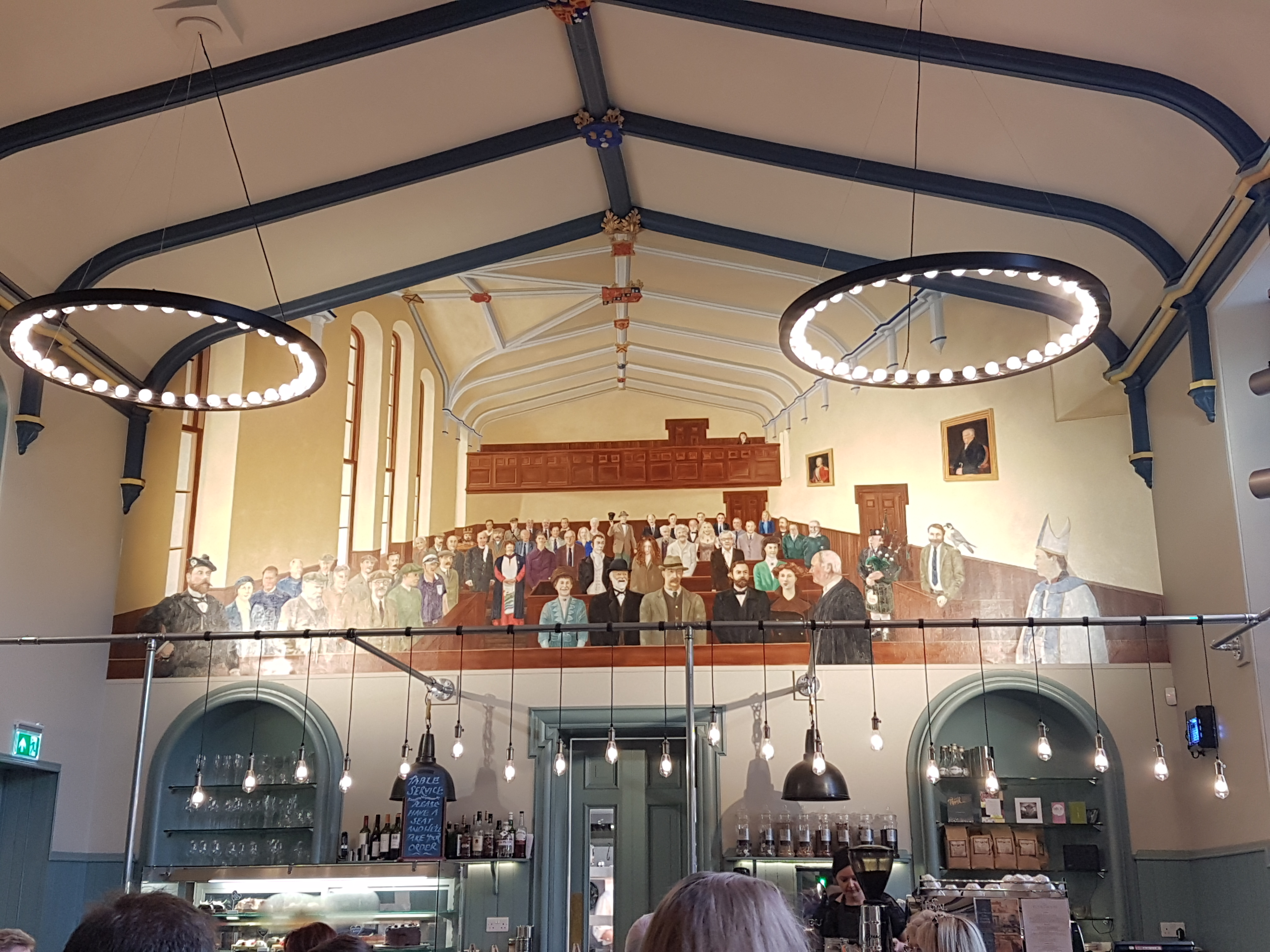
The courtroom with its pointed arch ceiling

In the first half of the 19th century, court hearings were held in a room in the tower of Dornoch Castle, accessed by a spiral staircase. However, in the mid-19th century, the Sutherland Commissioners of Supply decided to procure a dedicated courthouse for the county. At that time, Dornoch was the county town of Sutherland and the site they selected was on the south side of Castle Street, between Dornoch Jail and Dornoch Castle.

The new building was designed by Thomas Brown in the Gothic Tudor Revival style, built in ashlar stone and was completed in 1850. The design involved a symmetrical main frontage of five bays facing onto Castle Street. The central section of three bays, which was projected forward, featured a loggia formed by three round headed openings with hood moulds. On the first floor, there were three closely-set round headed lancet windows with a stepped gable above, flanked by two square-headed lancet windows with smaller gables above. The outer bays were fenestrated by round-headed windows on the ground floor and by sash windows on the first floor with small gables above. Internally, the principal room was a courtroom, which featured a pointed arch ceiling, on the first floor.

In 1890 county councils were established in each county of Scotland under the Local Government (Scotland) Act 1889. It also directed that the existing clerk to each county's Commissioners of Supply should automatically become the first clerk to the county council. Whilst the Sutherland commissioners met at the Sheriff Court, by then known as County Buildings, in Dornoch, their clerk at the time, George Tait, was based in Golspie. His offices therefore became the county council's first offices. The first provisional meeting of the council was held on 13 February 1890 at the County Buildings in Dornoch, but it was decided that a more accessible location was needed for the council's meetings. Although Dornoch was the county's only burgh, it was in the extreme south-eastern corner of the county and lay some seven miles from its then nearest railway station at The Mound. The council's first official meeting was held on 22 May 1890 at Bonar Bridge, and subsequent meetings were generally held at various premises in Lairg, with occasional meetings in other places, including Dornoch, Golspie, Brora and Lochinver. In 1892, permanent offices for the administrative staff were established in a building in Main Street, Golspie, which became known as the County Offices.

Meanwhile, the building in Dornoch continued to serve as the local sheriff court until hearings were transferred to Tain Sheriff Court in 2014. The Scottish Courts and Tribunals Service subsequently disposed of the building and it operated as shops and a restaurant known as "Green's at the Courthouse, Dornoch". The restaurant closed in 2026.

== See also ==
- List of listed buildings in Dornoch, Highland
