= Loch Brora =

Lake in Scotland

- Loch Bhrùra
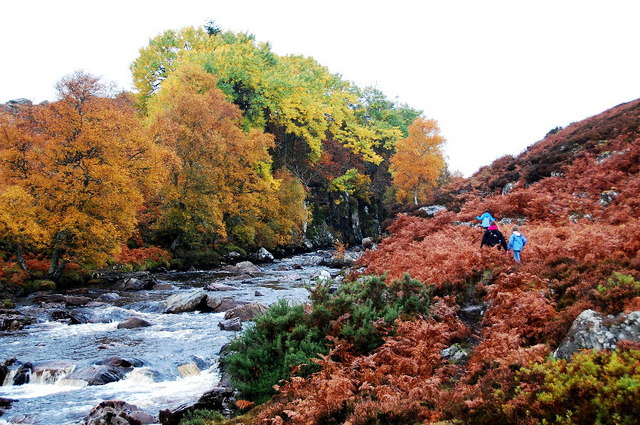
- The River Brora flowing just east of the Lake towards it

- Location within Sutherland
- Location: Scotland
- Coordinates: 58.05390167°N 3.95552158°W
- Primary inflows: River Brora, Black Water, Allt Smeorali
- Primary outflows: River Brora
- Basin countries: United Kingdom
- Max. length: 4.9 kilometres (3.0 mi)
- Max. width: 680 metres (2,230 ft)
- Surface area: 13 km squared (5 square miles)
- Surface elevation: 27.3 metres (90 ft)
- Frozen: Occasionally parts will freeze
- Islands: 2
- Settlements: Gordonbush, Killin, Carrol, Balnacoil

Loch Brora (Scottish Gaelic: Loch Bhrùra) is a loch in the Golspie parish near the east coast of Sutherland in the Highland council area in Northern Scotland. It is located directly south of a small road which links a few miles east with the A9 in Brora from where the loch gets its name.

Besides Brora, the area is also home to the settlements of Kilbraur, Balnacoil, Ascoil, Ardachadh. The settlements of Gordonbush, Oldtown, Killin and Carrol are on the lakefront itself.

== Geography ==
The Loch is long and thin with two small channels which give the illusion that there are three different lochs, not just one. At the southern end of the loch, there are two small unnamed islands. In terms of outflow there is only the River Brora. In terms of inflow, primarily there's the same River Brora which directly prior to flowing into the loch has another river, the Black Water flow into it. Additionally there are two other notable inflows to Loch Brora: Allt Smeorali and the Carrol Burn, both of which flow into the loch directly. There are a few other small streams and brooks which make up the inflow of Loch Brora. There are some trails on the southern bank of the loch, on the opposite side of the road. They spur up north from Carrol and round appropriately named Carrol Rock and some of the other small peaks around Loch Brora.

== Angling ==
Angling is popular in the area and within the waters of the Loch and nearby rivers. Salmon is a common catch.

== Wildlife ==
The Loch is home to a number of bird species including goldeneye, mallard, curlew, redshank, oystercatcher, lapwing, osprey, and occasionally golden eagles.

Mammals include otter, roe deer, moles and hedgehogs.
