= Megan Boyd =

British fly tyer

- Megan Boyd
- Born: Rosina Megan Boyd; 29 January 1915; Surrey, England
- Died: 15 November 2001 (aged 86); Golspie, Scotland
- Occupation: Fly tyer
- Known for: Atlantic salmon flies

Rosina Megan Boyd BEM (29 January 1915 – 15 November 2001) was a British fly tyer most noted for her Atlantic salmon flies. She lived most of her adult life in a small cottage in Kintradwell, near Brora, Scotland. Boyd, a renowned figure in the Scottish Highlands, was known for her fly tying skills, eccentric style, and service during World War II. Despite never fishing herself, Boyd's precision and quality in fly tying made her creations sought after by local anglers. She invented a traditional pattern called "The Megan Boyd," and her work earned her the British Empire Medal in 1971. Boyd retired at 70 due to failing eyesight but remained a major supporter of the North Atlantic Salmon Fund until her death in 2001.

== Early life ==
Megan Boyd was born Rosina Megan Boyd on 29 January 1915 in Surrey, England. She was the youngest of three children. In 1918 her father moved the family to the Scottish Highlands to take a job as a bailiff or river watcher on the River Brora on the Duke of Sutherland's sporting estate. She attended local schools until she was 15 when she took her first fly tying work. During World War II she held various jobs including delivering milk and duties as an auxiliary coast watcher. Boyd was described as full of energy and a much-loved local figure in Brora. Country dancing was her favorite relaxation and she took an active role in helping the old and disabled locally. Considered eccentric by some, Boyd dressed in men's clothes, with man's shirt and tie, sport jacket and heavy army-style boots. She cut her own hair in a very short crop known as the Eton Crop.

== Fly tyer ==
At the age of 12, Megan began taking fly tying lessons from Bob Trussler, another river keeper on the estate. Trussler's tutelage went on for many years with emphasis on precision and quality. Boyd also relied on two classic salmon fly publications for tying instructions and pattern recipes. She considered How To Dress Salmon Flies-A Handbook for Amateurs (1914) by T. E. Pryce-Tannatt as her "bible". She also relied on Kelson's The Salmon Fly (1895) for pattern advice. Her first paying fly tying work came when a Sir Charles Clauson requested she convert more than a dozen gut-eyed salmon flies onto the more modern eyed hooks or "irons". After seeing her work, local salmon anglers began asking Megan to tie flies for them and her reputation began to grow. Megan made her reputation by tying classic and traditional flies such as the Jock Scott, Silver Doctor, Durham Ranger and Wilkinson. She always claimed she tied flies for anglers and resisted tying for commercial fly houses. Her flies were extraordinarily durable and lasted many seasons. Over the course of her 65-year tying career, some estimate she tied tens of thousands of salmon flies. Yet despite the huge numbers of salmon that could not resist her flies, she never fished herself.

Now to disappoint all my customers, I do not fish, have no interest in fishing, and cannot even tie a fly to a cast.

— Attributed to Megan Boyd in The Women of a Graceful Rise

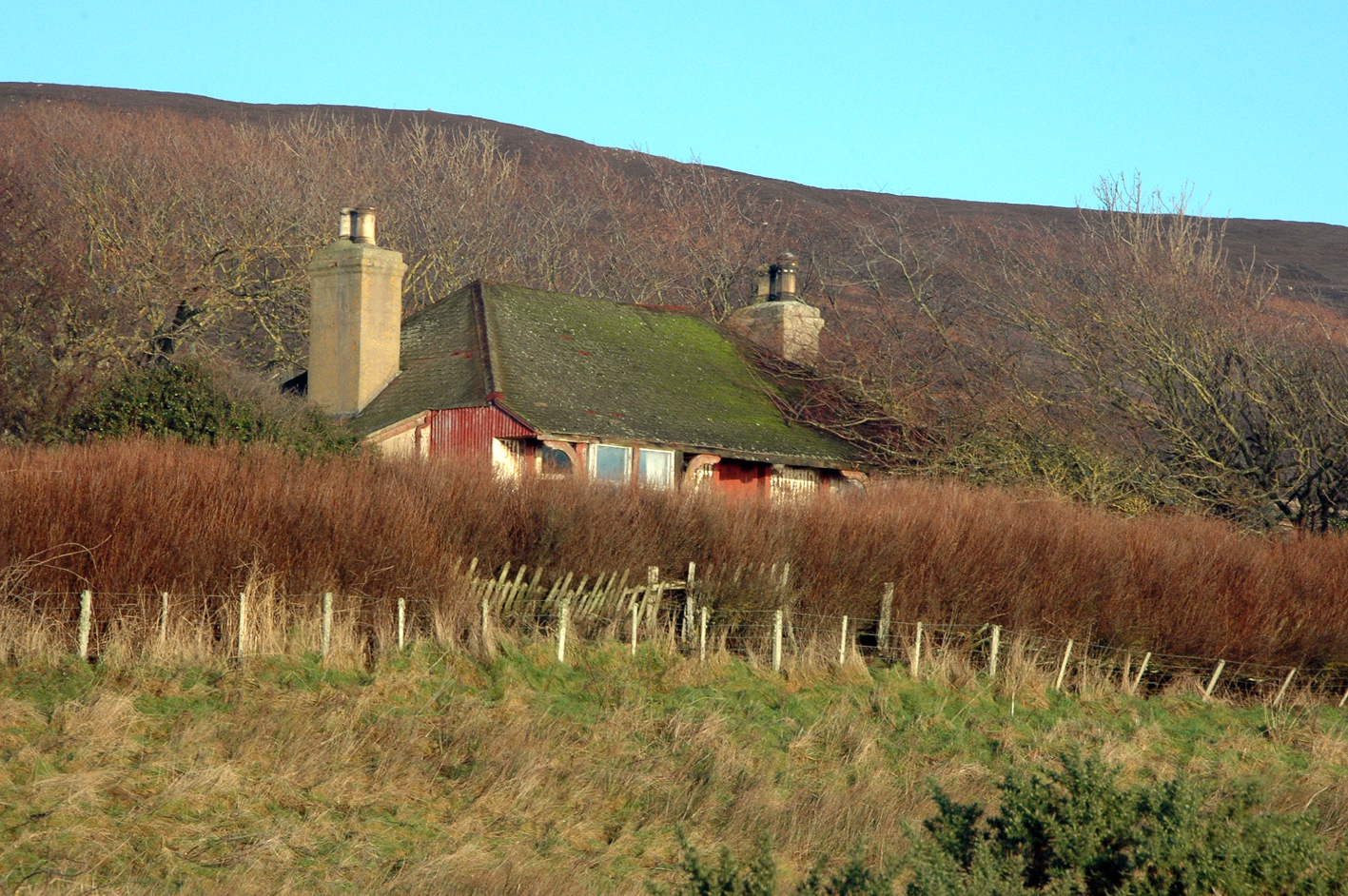
Boyd's cottage as it looked in 2012, in disrepair.

In 1935, at the age of twenty, Boyd left her family home and moved into a small cottage at Kintradwell overlooking the North Sea just north of Brora. The cottage was built from second hand materials in 1906 and did not have electricity or running water until the 1980s. She set up a small, kidney-shaped fly tying desk in a potting shed next to the cottage where she routinely worked 14-hour days tying flies to fill orders. Visiting anglers from around the world who came to fish the Rivers Brora and Helmsdale for salmon would stop by her cottage to watch her tie flies and place orders. If she was not at home, she left a small notepad and pencil under her doormat for visitors to write down their orders.

Boyd for the most part tied traditional patterns, but is credited with one of her own invention – The Megan Boyd – which proved to be a very effective low water pattern in the Scottish Highlands.

== Awards and legacy ==
As early as 1938, Boyd's flies were winning awards in competitions such as the 1938 Empire Exhibition in Glasgow where her flies won the Open award. Angler author Joseph D. Bates Jr. whose seminal works on Atlantic salmon flies include: Atlantic Salmon Flies and Fishing (1970) after polling the best of the world's fly tiers has been quoted as saying "The best are in Scotland, and of course Megan Boyd is the best in Scotland." Bates included several flies tied by Boyd in the color plates of his 1970 book. In a 1996 tribute to women who have influenced fly fishing in The American Fly Fisher, author Lyla Foggia said this about Boyd: "During six decades that Megan Boyd created her magical concoctions out of feathers and fur, she did indeed produce flies that many regard as 'The Tiffanies of the twentieth century'".

In 1971, Queen Elizabeth II awarded Boyd the British Empire Medal and invited her to Buckingham Palace to receive the medal. Boyd wrote to the Queen explaining she could not attend because she was busy playing bridge and no one could look after her dog Patch. The Queen wrote back explaining she understood as she had dogs herself. Later that year, Prince Charles, an avid user of her flies, presented Boyd the medal at his fishing lodge in the Highlands. They became friends and he visited Boyd at her cottage or in Brora on a number of occasions. When he married Lady Diana, Boyd sent the prince some flies as a wedding gift with the following note:

Dear Charlie. Best wishes to you and Lady Diana. May you enjoy a lifetime of peace and happiness. I have made a special fly for the occasion that I would like you to give to your wife. Tell her you will have the best catch you will ever have.

— Megan Boyd

In 2013, filmmaker Eric Steel produced and directed Kiss The Water, an 80-minute documentary on Megan Boyd's fly tying life. The film was shown at both the 2013 Tribeca Film Festival and the Edinburgh Film Festival. In the film, David Profumo, the fishing editor of Country Life magazine who was apprenticed with Boyd one summer during his youth, said:

She had the most delicate feminine hands; her creations were the Fabergés of the fishing world. You could say she wove a certain kind of magic.

— David Profumo, Kiss the Water

== Death ==
Boyd tied flies for almost six decades using only natural light or a gas lantern for illumination. At the age of 70, her eyesight began to fail and she was forced to retire from commercial tying in 1985. In 1988 she moved from her Kintradwell cottage into Brora. In 2000, Prince Charles paid her a visit in the nursing home where they discussed her favourite fly: the Popham.

She is remembered for her devotion to her work, living by herself and working many hours a day. She was a dedicated conservationist and a major supporter of the North Atlantic Salmon Fund and its efforts to preserve remaining stocks of wild salmon to their native rivers. Boyd regularly donated examples of her flies for auctions to raise funds for the salmon.

Boyd died on 15 November 2001 in Golspie, Scotland at the age of 86.
