= Balnacoil =

Coordinates: 58.07161°N 4.00332°W

Balnacoil: Scottish Gaelic: Baile na Coille
- Location within the Sutherland area
- OS grid reference: NC819109
- Council area: Highland
- Lieutenancy area: Sutherland
- Country: Scotland
- Sovereign state: United Kingdom
- Postcode district: KW9 6
- Police: Scotland
- Fire: Scottish
- Ambulance: Scottish

Balnacoil (from Scottish Gaelic Baile na Coille 'settlement of the wood') is a small crofting village, lying in the strath of Brora, one mile west of Loch Brora, in the east county of Sutherland, in Highland, Scotland. The River Brora, which rises in Ben Armine, runs through Balnacoil, draining into the loch.

Balnacoil is in the Scottish council area of Highland.
