= Dornoch Academy =

- Acadamaidh Dhornaich
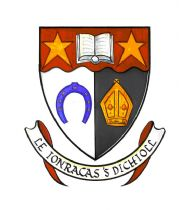
- Le Ionracas 's Dìchioll

Location
- Evelix Road; Dornoch, Sutherland, IV25 3HR; Scotland
- Coordinates: 57.8827°N 4.0454°W

Information
- Type: Secondary
- Motto: Le Ionracas 's Dìchioll (With Integrity and Industry)
- Established: 1913; 113 years ago, current school 1963
- Local authority: Highland
- Rector: Norman Ross (Acting)
- Staff: 25.2 (on an FTE basis)
- Gender: Mixed
- Age: S1 (approx age 11) to S6 (approx age 18)
- Enrolment: Approx. 250
- Language: English
- Houses: Carbisdale, Dunrobin & Skelbo
- Colours: Black and red
- Website: www.dornochacademy.org

Dornoch Academy (Scottish Gaelic: Acadamaidh Dhornaich) is a state secondary school situated in the small town of Dornoch in Sutherland in northern Scotland.

== Catchment ==
The school is a six-year comprehensive school serving the area of south east Sutherland between the Dornoch Firth and Loch Fleet which is rural with approximately three-quarters of the pupils coming to school by bus. The associated primary schools are Dornoch Primary and Bonar Bridge Primary, whose pupils transfer to Dornoch Academy automatically. The school shares catchment areas with Golspie High School and Tain Royal Academy.

== History ==
The name Dornoch Academy has been in use since 1913, when the town was provided with the new school building that now houses Dornoch Primary School. The existence of a teaching establishment throughout the centuries was ensured by the association of the Celtic Church within the area now occupied by the Burgh of Dornoch, the establishment of a Cathedral there in the early 13th century and the creation of Dornoch as a Royal Burgh in 1628. This long history is recognised in the school "badge", which uses the ensigns armorial, granted to the school by the Lord Lyon King of Arms.

The present Dornoch Academy building was opened in 1963 by Queen Elizabeth, the Queen Mother as purpose-built secondary accommodation for the school. The old building from then on was exclusively used by the primary department of the school. At that time the secondary provided education for pupils from a wider area than nowadays, some from the west and north coasts of Sutherland, who required hostel accommodation in the town. Pupils from the burgh itself received straight through education from Primary 1 to Secondary 6. Both the secondary and the primary department were under one head and this continued until 1986 when a new headteacher was appointed for the now autonomous Dornoch Primary School.

In 1968 Sutherland County Council reorganised its secondary education on comprehensive lines and, despite much opposition from the community, Dornoch Academy became a four-year secondary school with its senior pupils transferring to Golspie High School for certificate courses. The school was therefore only truly comprehensive in S1/S2 and soon after the raising of the school leaving age to 16, the Academy was further downgraded to be a two-year secondary from session 1973–74 onwards. For the next twenty-three years approximately one hundred pupils were educated, for two years, in a modern building designed for 350.

When local government was reorganised in 1974 Highland Regional Council had several two-year secondary schools, whose pupils all transferred to larger schools after S2 and usually lived in education authority hostels. This situation gradually changed from the mid-1980s as the council adopted a new policy of supporting local communities by upgrading these schools to six-year status, with their pupils staying all week with their own families.

While this process was nearing completion under council management elsewhere, in 1994 Dornoch Academy School Board "opted-out" under the provisions of Scotland's Self-Governing Schools Act of 1989.

It was one of three schools, in 1993, to apply for opting out. In 1994 it was the only one of those schools to have its opt out granted. That year, Stuart Sommerville of The Reformer wrote that the opting out caused a "row" that "has split the community for months now." In 1997 John Garvie, the rector, stated that the opting out had a positive outcome.

Shortly after, Dornoch Academy received authority to upgrade back to six-year status in stages, from 1 May 1996 onwards. The school started its first session with a "sixth-year" once again in August 1999. By this time the Dornoch Academy had, by mutual agreement, returned to council management under the new unitary Highland Council.

== Houses ==
Students are divided into three houses: Carbisdale (Red), Dunrobin (Green) and Skelbo (Blue). Previously the houses were Mackay and Sutherland – Red and Blue respectively. The new system is thought to facilitate the guidance system more, considering a higher school roll than when the previous houses were formed when the current school opened in 1963.

== School building ==
Dornoch Academy extends over three floors and a tower block.

The ground floor departments include RMPS, Modern Studies, Modern Languages, Physical Education, Technical, PSE and Drama. The ground floor also comprises the main reception and clerical areas, along with the dining hall and the assembly hall/stage.

First floor departments include English, History, Geography, Music, Art, Chemistry, Biology and Physics. The library is also located on the first floor.

Second floor departments include Mathematics, Business Management and Chemistry.
