= Dornoch distillery =

Region: Highland
- Location: Dornoch, Scotland, UK
- Coordinates: 57°52′57.2″N 4°1′42.4″W
- Owner: Thompson Independent Traders Ltd.
- Founded: 2017
- Founder: Simon Thompson; Philip Thompson
- Status: Operational
- No. of stills: 1 wash stills 1 spirit stills
- Website: www.thompsonbrosdistillers.com

Dornoch distillery is a Highland single malt Scotch whisky and gin distillery located in Dornoch, Scotland. The products from the distillery, as well as independent bottlings from other distilleries, are released under the Thompson Bros brand name.

== History ==
Dornoch distillery was founded in 2017 in a 19th-century Victorian fire station, part of the Dornoch Castle Hotel by the brothers Simon and Philip Thompson. The distillery was built with the intention of producing single malt whisky and organic gin.

The first product to be released from the distillery was a limited edition experimental gin. The distillery subsequently released what it called a 'single malt gin', made from scratch on site. The core gin expression from the distillery is the Thompson Bros. Mediterranean Gin, which was first released in November 2021.

The first single malt, Dornoch 2017 3 Year Old Single Cask #001 Thompson Bros Inaugural Release was released in 2022.

In September 2022, Phil & Simon Thompson unveiled plans for a new £7million, eco-friendly whisky distillery to be named Struie distillery. A public crowdfunding campaign was launched in 2025, with the aim to raise £4-£5 million towards the project. Subsequently, Dornoch Distillery Company Ltd. was reorganised under the ownership of Thompson Independent Traders Ltd.
