= Kinlochbervie High School =

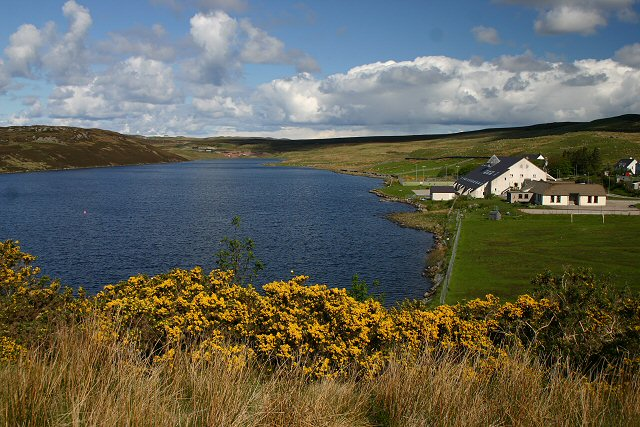
- Kinlochbervie High School, beside Loch Innis na Bà Buidhe

Location
- Kinlochbervie, Sutherland, IV27 4RG; Scotland; 58°27′40″N 5°02′11″W

Information
- Established: 1995
- Enrolment: 41
- Website: http://www.nws-schools.com

Kinlochbervie High School (Scottish Gaelic: Àrd-Sgoil Cheann Loch Biorbhaidh) is a secondary school in Kinlochbervie, in the county of Sutherland in the northwest of Scotland.

The school is attended by 33 pupils from a catchment area that extends from Scourie to Durness. Before the school opened in 1995, pupils attended Golspie High School as weekly boarders.

The current head teacher is John Naples-Campbell

== Associated schools ==
Primary schools at Durness, Kinlochbervie and Scourie send pupils to Kinlochbervie.
