= List of listed buildings in Golspie, Highland =

This is a list of listed buildings in the parish of Golspie in Highland, Scotland.

== List ==
Name	Location	Date Listed	Grid Ref. (Note: Sometimes known as OSGB36, the grid reference (where provided) is based on the British national grid reference system used by the Ordnance Survey. • "Guide to National Grid". Ordnance Survey. • "Get-a-map". Ordnance Survey.)	Geo-coordinates	Notes	LB Number (Note: Historic Environment Scotland assign a unique alphanumeric identifier to each designated site in Scotland, for listed buildings this always begins with "LB", for example "LB12345".)	Image
Little Ferry Pier And Boathouse				57°56′01″N 4°01′07″W	Category C(S)	7017	Upload Photo
Strathsteven Cottages				57°59′27″N 3°53′40″W	Category C(S)	7023	Upload Photo
Golspie Fountain Street Duchess/Countess (Elizabeth) Sutherland Memorial Fountain				57°58′31″N 3°58′41″W	Category B	7029	Upload Photo
Golspie Main Street Co-Op Drapery				57°58′23″N 3°58′35″W	Category B	7037	Upload Photo
Dunrobin Castle Garden Pavilion (Museum) And Walled Garden				57°58′56″N 3°56′33″W	Category A	7045	Upload another image
Dunrobin Castle North Entrance, Stables, Carriage House And Lodges				57°59′08″N 3°56′51″W	Category B	7052	Upload Photo
Dunrobin Mains Kennels				57°59′15″N 3°57′01″W	Category B	7058	Upload Photo
Strathsteven Lodge				57°59′19″N 3°54′05″W	Category C(S)	7025	Upload Photo
Golspie Main Street The Cottage (R) Newton (L) (Former Police Station)				57°58′29″N 3°58′23″W	Category C(S)	7032	Upload Photo
Golspie, Main Street, Seacrest And Shop (R) Helenville (L)				57°58′28″N 3°58′22″W	Category C(S)	7038	Upload Photo
Golspie Main Street Clach Ruach (R) Anvil House (L)				57°58′29″N 3°58′20″W	Category C(S)	7039	Upload Photo
Golspie Main Street Messrs Lindsay				57°58′29″N 3°58′20″W	Category C(S)	7040	Upload Photo
Dunrobin, Old Barn Cottages				57°59′22″N 3°55′19″W	Category B	7057	Upload Photo
Golspie, Old Bank Street, T.A.Hall				57°58′41″N 3°57′48″W	Category B	12951	Upload Photo
Golspie Old Bank Street Macleod House (Education Hostel)				57°58′38″N 3°57′54″W	Category C(S)	7006	Upload Photo
Golspie Old Bank Street, The Sutherland Arms Hotel				57°58′42″N 3°57′50″W	Category B	7007	Upload Photo
Golspie 1 And 2, Review Park				57°59′06″N 3°57′03″W	Category B	7011	Upload Photo
Golspie Station Road, Old Heavitree Farm				57°58′19″N 3°58′50″W	Category B	7013	Upload Photo
Kirkton				57°57′41″N 4°01′45″W	Category C(S)	7014	Upload Photo
Little Ferry Mr Urquhart's House				57°56′03″N 4°01′07″W	Category C(S)	7016	Upload Photo
Golspie Duke Street. The Wee Shop And Nos 1 And 2				57°58′33″N 3°57′57″W	Category B	7027	Upload Photo
Dunrobin Castle Dovecote				57°58′51″N 3°56′49″W	Category B	7047	Upload Photo
Dunrobin Castle Flagstaff Lodge And Gate Piers				57°58′48″N 3°57′26″W	Category B	7049	Upload Photo
Golspie Church Street Free Church And Former Free Church School				57°58′11″N 3°59′03″W	Category B	7061	Upload Photo
Mound Bridge And Keeper's Cottage				57°57′24″N 4°04′13″W	Category A	7022	Upload Photo
Uppat James Loch Memorial				57°59′27″N 3°54′28″W	Category B	7026	Upload Photo
Golspie, Fountain Road, Lochnagarry				57°58′29″N 3°58′36″W	Category B	7028	Upload Photo
Golspie Main Street James Fraser Shop				57°58′25″N 3°58′33″W	Category B	7030	Upload another image
Golspie Main Street Glen Coul (R) Gairloch (L)				57°58′23″N 3°58′39″W	Category B	7031	Upload Photo
Golspie Main Street The Hollies				57°58′33″N 3°58′05″W	Category B	7035	Upload Photo
Dunrobin Castle				57°58′54″N 3°56′44″W	Category A	7044	Upload another image
Dunrobin Castle Private Burial Ground				57°59′01″N 3°56′18″W	Category B	7053	Upload Photo
Dunrobin Mains Dunrobin Farmhouse And Keeper's Cottage				57°59′13″N 3°57′03″W	Category B	7056	Upload Photo
Golspie Railway Station				57°58′17″N 3°59′13″W	Category B	7009	Upload Photo
Little Ferry "Bertha's House" And Store To Rear				57°56′02″N 4°01′05″W	Category C(S)	7018	Upload Photo
Littleferry Ice House				57°56′04″N 4°01′07″W	Category B	7019	Upload Photo
Uppat House And South Gate Piers				57°59′53″N 3°54′46″W	Category B	7024	Upload Photo
Golspie Old Bank Street Ben Bhraggie Hotel				57°58′35″N 3°57′57″W	Category C(S)	7043	Upload Photo
Dunrobin Castle Dairy Cottage And Former Milking Parlour				57°58′44″N 3°57′01″W	Category B	7046	Upload Photo
Ben Bhragaidh Monument To First Duke Of Sutherland				57°58′54″N 4°00′24″W	Category B	7063	Upload Photo
Drummuie				57°58′12″N 3°59′56″W	Category B	7064	Upload another image
Golspie Railway Viaduct Over Golspie Burn				57°58′51″N 3°57′45″W	Category B	7010	Upload Photo
Golspie Main Street St Andrew's Parish Church (Church Of Scotland And Burial Ground)				57°58′33″N 3°58′00″W	Category A	7036	Upload another image
Golspie Main Street Ford Park (Former Church Of Scotland Manse)				57°58′31″N 3°57′57″W	Category B	7041	Upload Photo
Golspie Mill				57°58′47″N 3°57′41″W	Category B	7042	Upload Photo
Dunrobin Castle Tower Lodge				57°58′33″N 3°57′49″W	Category B	7055	Upload Photo
Golspie Bridge Over Golspie Burn				57°58′44″N 3°57′45″W	Category B	7060	Upload Photo
Dunrobin, Sportsman's Walk Cottage				57°59′18″N 3°56′57″W	Category C(S)	7062	Upload Photo
Golspie Old Bank Street 1 And 2, Drill Hall Cottages				57°58′41″N 3°57′50″W	Category B	7008	Upload Photo
Little Ferry Ferry Cottage				57°56′03″N 4°01′09″W	Category C(S)	7015	Upload Photo
Little Ferry Former Girnel, Now Cottages				57°56′03″N 4°01′29″W	Category B	7020	Upload Photo
Morvich Lodge (Strath Fleet)				57°58′43″N 4°06′28″W	Category B	7021	Upload Photo
Golspie Main Street, Clydesdale Bank				57°58′29″N 3°58′21″W	Category C(S)	7033	Upload Photo
Golspie Main Street Bank Of Scotland				57°58′32″N 3°58′13″W	Category C(S)	7034	Upload Photo
Dunrobin Castle, Duchess Harriet Memorial				57°58′51″N 3°57′05″W	Category B	7048	Upload Photo
Dunrobin Mains Fisherman's Bothy/Rod Room (Immediately East Of Kennels)				57°59′14″N 3°57′00″W	Category B	7059	Upload Photo
Drummuie, Golspie Technical School				57°58′11″N 4°00′00″W	Category B	7065	Upload another image
Post Office, Main Street, Golspie				57°58′30″N 3°58′14″W	Category C(S)	12916	Upload Photo
Golspie, Main Street, Smiddy To Rear Of Anvil House				57°58′28″N 3°58′20″W	Category B	7005	Upload Photo
Golspie Rhives House				57°58′37″N 3°58′57″W	Category B	7012	Upload Photo
Dunrobin Castle Ice House				57°58′55″N 3°56′51″W	Category C(S)	7050	Upload Photo
Dunrobin Castle Monument, 2Nd Duke Of Sutherland				57°59′09″N 3°56′52″W	Category B	7051	Upload Photo
Dunrobin Castle Station Waiting Room				57°59′09″N 3°56′50″W	Category B	7054	Upload Photo

== Key ==
The scheme for classifying buildings in Scotland is:

- Category A: "buildings of national or international importance, either architectural or historic; or fine, little-altered examples of some particular period, style or building type."
- Category B: "buildings of regional or more than local importance; or major examples of some particular period, style or building type, which may have been altered."
- Category C: "buildings of local importance; lesser examples of any period, style, or building type, as originally constructed or moderately altered; and simple traditional buildings which group well with other listed buildings."

In March 2016 there were 47,288 listed buildings in Scotland. Of these, 8% were Category A, and 50% were Category B, with the remaining 42% being Category C.

== See also ==
- List of listed buildings in Highland
