= The Symbolist Movement in Literature =

Book by Arthur Symons

The Symbolist Movement in Literature, first published in 1899, and with additional material in 1919, is a work by Arthur Symons largely credited with bringing French Symbolism to the attention of Anglo-American literary circles. Its first two editions were vital influences on W. B. Yeats and T. S. Eliot—a note that, for nothing else, would assure its historical place with the most important early Modernist criticism. Richard Ellmann has contributed an Introduction to most modern editions.

== Textual history ==
While The Symbolist Movement in Literature was first published in monograph book form in 1899, its origins can be traced back to previous essays and articles published by Symons. In 1893, Symons' article The Decadent Movement in Literature appeared in the November volume of Harper's New Monthly Magazine. This ten page article touched on many of the authors subsequently discussed in "The Symbolist Movement in Literature", such as Huysmans, Maeterlinck, Verlaine and Villers de L'Isle-Adam. The 1893 essay also mentioned the English writers Pater and Henley.

A few years later adverts were placed for The Decadent Movement in Literature to be published imminently as a book in its own right. In 1896, an advert appeared in The Savoy, which Symons served as literary editor for and Leonard Smithers published. The advert, placed by Smithers himself (for he was hoping to publish it), stated the book to be 'in preparation'. In 1897, Smithers placed an identical advert in his bijou edition of Pope's Rape of the Lock. One assumes that Symons was working on an expanded version of his 1893 article, to be published in a single volume under the same name. How and when Symons decided to change the title word of 'Decadent' to 'Symbolist' is unclear. What is clear, however, is that between 1893 and 1899, Symons' own perception of and sensibility towards literary Decadence changed.

Many of the essays in the 1899 edition of The Symbolist Movement in Literature were initially published as individual articles between 1897 and 1899 in periodicals such as The Star or The Athenaeum, before being revised and collated for the final monograph.

== Contents ==
Symons's book is a collection of short essays on various authors. A list of contents is useful, among other reasons, for determining the time and trace of its influence. Eliot, for instance, would not have read about Baudelaire in his 1908 edition. Essays on English authors were added for Symons's 1924 Collected Works.

=== 1899 and 1908 ===
1. Gérard de Nerval
2. Villiers de L'Isle-Adam
3. Arthur Rimbaud
4. Paul Verlaine
5. Jules Laforgue
6. Stéphane Mallarmé
7. The Later Huysmans
8. Maeterlinck as a Mystic

=== Additions in 1919 ===
1. Balzac
2. Prosper Mérimée
3. Théophile Gautier
4. Gustave Flaubert
5. Charles Baudelaire
6. Edmond and Jules de Goncourt
7. Léon Cladel
8. A Note on Zola's Method

== Influence ==
Arthur Symons was a close friend of Yeats, and the mutual influence was probably just as much one of conversation as of letters. Its dedicatory note (to Yeats) opens:

May I dedicate to you this book on the Symbolist movement in literature, both as an expression of a deep personal friendship and because you, more than any one else, will sympathise with what I say in it, being yourself the chief representative of that movement in our country? France is the country of movements, and it is naturally in France that I have studied the development of a principle which is spreading throughout other countries, perhaps not less effectually, if with less definite outlines....

T. S. Eliot, whose relationship with the book was significantly less dialectical—he discovered its second edition in a bookshop while at Harvard, though he did eventually write to Symons—was perhaps even more influenced by it:

I owe Mr. Symons a great debt: but for having read his book I should not, in the year 1908, have heard of Laforgue or Rimbaud; I should probably not have begun to read Verlaine; but for reading Verlaine, I should not have heard of Corbière. So the Symons book is one of those which have affected the course of my life.

Its importance for other contemporary writers was also, of course, profound. Richard Ellmann, James Joyce's most preeminent biographer, argues that Symons was a major influence for Joyce's decision to emigrate to Paris (though Joyce's attitude toward Rimbaud, as evinced by the former's letters, was generally negative). In a later generation Symons' book was responsible, for example, for alerting the young British poet David Gascoyne to the appeal of French poets such as Rimbaud and Baudelaire, some of whom he was to memorably translate.

== Notes ==
(Unless otherwise noted, all quotations taken from the 1958 ed.)
