= Isabella Gordon Mackay =

Isabella Mackay
- Born: Isabella Gordon; 1777/8; Brora
- Died: 15 November 1850; Edinburgh
- Occupation: Philanthropist
- Known for: funding education at Cape Breton Island in Nova Scotia

Isabella Mackay born Isabella Gordon (1777/8 – 15 November 1850) was a British philanthropist and religious activist. She was the leading light of the Edinburgh Ladies Association and together they funded the education at Cape Breton Island in Nova Scotia in the nineteenth century.

== Life ==
Mackay was probably born in Brora in 1777 or 1778. Her parents were landed gentry even if their estate was small. They were Isabella (born McLeod of Geanies) and John Gordon of Carrol.

She married John Mackay of Rockfield on 3 May 1803 and the following year they bought a small estate at Tarbat, Easter Ross which they called "Rockfield". They were the largest landowners in Tarbat. Her husband was briefly in the civil service in India until he was declared blind. He was given a pension and returned to Scotland. They were Presbyterians and their father-in-law was Reverend Thomas Mackay who was a University of Edinburgh graduate and a previous minister of Lairg. They enjoyed a high social status and they lived in a number of places in England in Scotland, including the highlands, Devon and London. In 1823 they returned again to Edinburgh and settled, although they spent their summers at "Rockfield" which they maintained and improved.

In 1832 she appealed to the Edinburgh Ladies' Association to support her interests. She was concerned with supporting the Scottish Presbyterian people in Nova Scotia in Canada. In particular the colony on Cape Breton Island. She and the association acted as one and Mackay would write to prominent Scots for support. The association recruited teachers in Scotland and sent them to Canada to help the children of the island to learn, become good Presbyterians and to learn Gaelic.

In 1837 the Boularderie Academy opened and Mackay is credited with remotely causing this to happen. The academy offered lessons about English grammar, geography, Latin, algebra, and navigation. Moreover, she was arranging bursaries for leading Cape Breton Island students to attend the Free Church College in Halifax. The college would welcome these students as it was Mackay who paid for a third of that college library's costs.

== Death and legacy ==
Mackay died in Edinburgh in 1850. By this time "her" Association was funding three teachers, five ministers, eight catechists and three students in Cape Breton Island.

Laurie Stanley-Blackwell published "The Well-watered Garden: The Presbyterian Church in Cape Breton, 1798-1860" in 1983 which identifies Isabella Gordan Mackey as a "whirlwind".

In 1995 a memorial of thanks was raised to her and the Edinburgh Ladies Association. Thanks to them Cape Breton Island in Nova Scotia enjoyed teachers, ministers, an academy, books and bibles to improve their spirits. The stone is at the position of where the academy was. The academy was staffed by a young couple who taught children there and they would write to the association that sent them. Alexander and Catherine Munro were both trained at David Stow's Glasgow Normal School and Catherine was appointed so that the academy could also teach female students. The 1995 memorial (above) mentions particularly the Boularderie Academy calling it the "Boularderie (Munro) Academy".
