= Arthur Symons =

British poet, critic and magazine editor

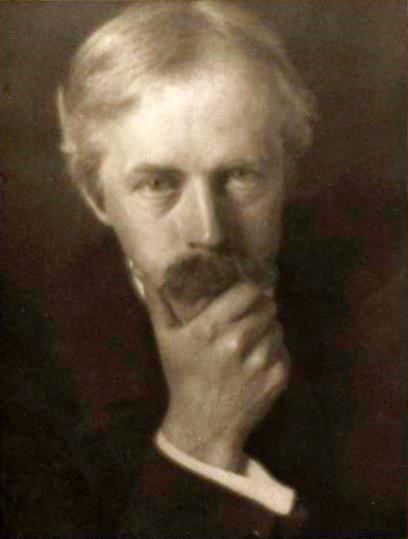
- Photograph by Alvin Coburn, 1906
- Born: Arthur William Symons; 28 February 1865; Milford Haven, Wales
- Died: 22 January 1945 (aged 79); Tenterden, England
- Notable work: The Decadent Movement in Literature; The Symbolist Movement in Literature
- Movement: Decadent Movement
- Spouse: Rhoda Bowser (m. 1901; died 1936)

Signature
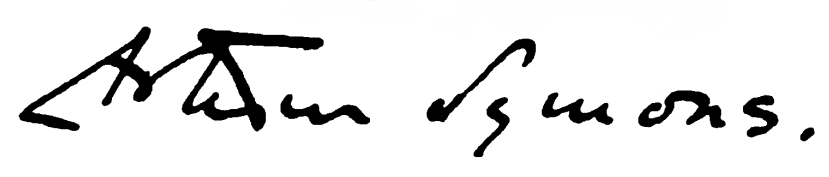

Arthur William Symons (28 February 1865 – 22 January 1945) was a British poet, critic, translator and magazine editor.

== Life ==
Born in Milford Haven, Wales, to Cornish parents, Symons was educated privately, spending much of his time in France and Italy. In 1884–1886, he edited four of Bernard Quaritch's Shakespeare Quarto Facsimiles, and in 1888–1889 seven plays of the "Henry Irving" Shakespeare. He became a member of the staff of the Athenaeum in 1891, and of the Saturday Review in 1894, but his major editorial feat was his work with the short-lived Savoy.

In 1892, The Minister's Call, Symons' first play, was produced by the Independent Theatre Society – a private club – to avoid censorship by the Lord Chamberlain's Office.

Symons conducted a series of affairs throughout his life, but around 1893, he began a long-term relationship with a secret lover who has never been identified but whom he called "Lydia" and commemorated in his book Amoris Victima (1897). On June 19, 1901 he married Rhoda Bowser (1874–1936), an aspiring actress and oldest daughter of a Newcastle-upon-Tyne shipping magnate.

Lydia Symons, Symons' mother, died in March 1896. She and Symons have been described as having had an affectionate relationship, about which Symons wrote a sonnet. The same year, Symons met and began an extensive correspondence with Sarojini Naidu. Their letters contain advice he gave regarding her work as a poet and exhibit their ambiguous relationship. A scholar speculates that Symons viewed Naidu as a daughter, mother, and lover.

Symons' 1897 book Studies in Two Literatures was one of his earliest works as a serious critic and established lyricism, mysticism, profundity, modernity, and sincerity as the various traits he would consider in his critiques. His 1899 book The Symbolist Movement in Literature emphasized the importance of both lyricism and mysticism, with the latter being particularly important to Symons' beliefs regarding both poets and symbolists.

Throughout this time, Symons' mental health declined. His growing depression and acedia has been attributed to the losses he suffered and his pursuit of the Decadent ideal.

In 1902, Symons published a selection of his earlier verse as Poems. He translated from the Italian of Gabriele D'Annunzio The Dead City (1900) and The Child of Pleasure (1898), and from the French of Émile Verhaeren The Dawn (1898). To The Poems of Ernest Dowson (1905) he prefixed an essay on the deceased poet, who was a kind of English Verlaine and had many attractions for Symons.

In early 1908, Symons received news that a translated version of his play Tristan and Iseult: A Play in Four Acts (1917) was to be put on in Italy. Symons and his wife decided to tour Europe that autumn. While in Venice, Symons began to become overstimulated and feverish, and soon left his wife behind while travelling between several different hotels around the region. His letters to friends and family were vastly different from his previous work. After wandering lost through the countryside for two days, suffering fatigue and symptoms of madness, he was found and arrested by two Italian soldiers and held in prison in Ferrara. His wife soon located him, and within a few months he was transferred from an Italian ward to a doctor's care back in England.

After Symons' psychotic breakdown, he published little new work for more than twenty years. His wife Rhoda took over the management of his affairs. His Confessions: A Study in Pathology (1930) describes his breakdown and treatment.

Most of Symons' work as a critic was published between 1903 and 1906 in publications such as Weekly Critical Review, the Saturday Review, and Outlook. In 1925, Symons published his book, Studies on Modern Painters, using many of the articles he wrote for Weekly Critical Review and Outlook.

In 1918, Vanity Fair magazine published Symons' Baudelarian essay, "The Gateway to an Artificial Paradise: The Effects of Hashish and Opium Compared." On one occasion between 1889 and 1895, John Addington Symonds, Ernest Dowson, and "some of Symons' lady friends from the ballet all tried hashish during an afternoon tea given by Symons in his rooms at Fountain Court."

His wife died in Tenterden, Kent, in 1936; Symons likely died in the same house (Island Cottage, Back Street, Kingsgate) in 1945.

== Contributions to literature ==
Arthur Symons contributed to symbolism and decadence, though "decadent" became the term used more often later in his career. In 1893, Symons offered a definition of the word “decadent” in application to 1890s literature by describing it as having "all the qualities we find in the Greek, the Latin, decadence: an intense self-consciousness, a restless curiosity In research, an over-subtilizing refinement upon refinement, a spiritual and moral perversity." Contrasting it with classic literature, he refers to decadent literature as "a new and beautiful and Interesting disease". Through his life and own poetry he embodied his definition of the decadent ideal.

His criticisms of French artists spread to the upcoming artists, influencing W. B. Yeats and T. S. Eliot. Symons strived to internationalize English literature and culture. He translated many international authors' works. Italian writer Gabriele D'Annunzio was the main focus of Symons' translations, as both authors used decadent devices.

Symons contributed poems and essays to The Yellow Book. He later compiled his short essays from 1899–1919 in The Symbolist Movement in Literature, which examines Honoré de Balzac, Prosper Mérimée, and earlier authors such as Gérard de Nerval. Though he does not directly define symbolism in his introduction, he portrays it as a movement. Symons also created The Decadent Movement in Literature which was published in Harper’s New Monthly Magazine in November 1893, where he claims decadence is the most representative literature of the day.

=== Inspirations ===
Symons' work appears to have been heavily influenced by art and literature critic Walter Pater, both in his poetry and his Decadent beliefs. He dedicated his first collection of poetry, Days and Nights, to Pater. Symons' essay, A Study of Walter Pater (1932), provides a deep analysis of Pater's notable works and praises Pater's book, The Renaissance, for having "more flawless prose" than that of most writers at the time. Many of Symons' writings closely resemble Pater's.

English poet Robert Browning is another writer from whom Symons drew inspiration. Like Pater, his style is replicated in Days and Nights. Symon's earliest published essay is An Introduction to the Study of Browning (1886) and, like the essay about Pater, it delves into Browning's poetry in an analytical light while simultaneously praising his language and his capturing of the human experience.

In September 1989, Symons took his to Paris, where he became an admirer and friend of Paul Verlaine. He wrote more articles on Verlaine than on any other literary figure, translated a large body of his work, dedicated London Nights to him, "en temoignage d'amitie et d'admiration", and worked with William Rothenstein to organize a lecture tour in England for Verlaine. Symons found Verlaine's poetry to most effectively achieve decadent ideals. According to Symons, Verlaine accomplishes "[fixing] the last fine shade, the quintessence of things, to fix it fleetingly; to be a disembodied voice, and yet the voice of a human soul". Symons' poetry in Silhouettes (1892) and London Nights (1895) demonstrates Verlaine's influence in tone and style. Symons writes with a "melancholic, faintly ironic tone" and uses poetic techniques similar to Verlaine's, including internal rhyme, alliteration, word repetition, constant shifting of accent and stress, and enjambment.

== Literary themes and devices ==
=== Rootlessness ===
Symons's "A Prelude to Life" — "part autobiography, part essay, part fiction" — "appeared in his only work of short fiction, Spirited Adventures (1905)". It presents Symons in his youth and early adult life. Symons presents himself as aimless and destitute, which reflects his partialness to the word "vagabond", which describes his wandering, decadent approach as a critic and writer.

=== Repetition ===
Many of Symons' writings were recycled, with small modifications added through each cycle. This repetition caused a need for reassessment with Symons' work, especially his publications as a critic.

=== Eroticism and urban life ===
Symons' early poetry focused on capturing urban life's mysticism and featured explicit displays of eroticism, as in Days and Nights (1889). His essay on French sculptor Auguste Rodin, Studies in Seven Arts (1906), emphasized sensuality and eroticism in Rodin's work.

== Reception and legacy ==
The immediate reception in 1899 of The Symbolist Movement in Literature was highly positive, and it was well received both in England and France. It garnered attention from Mercure de France, one of the key French literary journals of the time, which published a positive review by H. Devray. Symons played a crucial role in introducing English readers to French Symbolist writers such as Paul Verlaine, Arthur Rimbaud, Stéphane Mallarmé, Jules Laforgue, Auguste Villiers de l'Isle-Adam. He created a bridge between the English and French literary worlds, and his work helped shape how Symbolist literature was understood in Britain.

=== Influence ===
Many later writers, including include T. S Eliot, W. B. Yeats, and Oscar Wilde, credit Symons with influencing their works, drawing from his ideas on the "significant moment".

Symons is also cited as having kickstarted Sarojini Naidu's career as a poet. In 1904, Symons published her poems when she was unable to. He also wrote the introduction to her first published collection of poems, The Golden Threshold (1905).

=== Critical reception ===
Symons's contemporary Holbrook Jackson stated that Symons' "vision of the decadent idea" was clearer in his earlier works than in his later ones, and later Decadent critics focused more on his earlier writings on the subject.

Samuel Chew, another contemporary, considered Symons' poetry and the Decadent movement on a whole to be "morbid", "perverse", and "unwholesome".

In his article, "Arthur Symons as Poet: Theory and Practice", John M. Munro considers the poems of Symons' first published collection, Days and Nights, as "more in the nature of literary exercises than finished works of art". Munro also suggests that the poems could have been written by "anyone with a modicum of sensibility and an aptitude for rhyme". He asserts that Symons had not yet found his poetic voice at this time. However, Munro notes that, with the publication of Silhouettes, Symons began to write in a more decadent tone. He claims that while Symons remains dependent on literary models, his influences of Baudelaire and Browning transition to Verlaine.

Critic Arnold B. Sklare wrote that Symons' book "Confessions is awful.... Confessions, together with a large body of criticism and poetry produced between 1913 and 1935, reveal that a sensitive and highly speculative mind experienced a wound which had never wholly healed".

== Verse and drama ==
- Days and Nights (1889)
- Silhouettes (1892)
- The Minister's Call (1892). A Play.
- London Nights (1895) a poetry collection including 'To Muriel: At the Opera'
- Amoris victima (1897)
- Images of Good and Evil (1899)
- Poems in 2 volumes (contains: The Loom of Dreams in the second volume, 1901), (1902)
- Lyrics (1903): An anthology of poetry published in the US only.
- A Book of Twenty Songs (1905)
- The Fool of the World and other Poems (1906)
- A Book of Parodies (1908)
- Poems by Arthur Symons in 2 volumes (1911)
- Knave of Hearts (1913). Poems written between 1894 and 1908.
- The Toy Cart (1916). A Play.
- Tristan and Iseult: A Play in Four Acts (1917)
- Tragedies (1922)
- Love's Cruelty (1923)
- Jezebel Mort, and other poems (1931)

== Essays ==
- An Introduction to the Study of Browning (1886)
- Studies in Two Literatures (1897)
- Aubrey Beardsley: An Essay with a Preface (1898)
- The Symbolist Movement in Literature (1899; 1919 revised and enlarged)
- Cities (1903), word-pictures of Rome, Venice, Naples, Seville, etc.
- Plays, Acting and Music (1903)
- Studies in Prose and Verse (1904)
- Studies in Seven Arts (1906)
- William Blake (1907)
- Dante Gabriel Rossetti [International Art Series No. I] (1910)
- Figures of Several Centuries (1916)
- Cities and Sea-Coasts and Islands (1918)
- Colour Studies in Paris (1918)
- The Gateway to an Artificial Paradise: The Effects of Hashish and Opium Compared (1918)
- Studies in the Elizabethan Drama (1919)
- Charles Baudelaire: A Study (1920)
- Dramatis Personae (1925 – US edition 1923)
- The Cafe Royal and other Essays (1923)
- Notes on Joseph Conrad with some Unpublished Letters (1925)
- From Toulouse-Lautrec to Rodin (1929)
- Studies in Strange Souls (1929). Studies of Rossetti and Swinburne.
- Confessions: A Study in Pathology (1930). A book containing Symons's description of his breakdown and treatment.
- The Adventures of Giuseppe Pignata (1930)
- Wanderings (1931)
- A Study of Walter Pater (1932)

== Fiction ==
- Spiritual Adventures (1905).
  - With an autobiographical sketch and extracts from the 'Life of Lucy Newcome' based on his lover 'Muriel' (Edith Broadbent)
  - includes the short story "Esther Kahn" which was developed into the film Esther Kahn.
