= River Brora =

River in Sutherland, Scotland

Coordinates: 58°01′N 3°52′W

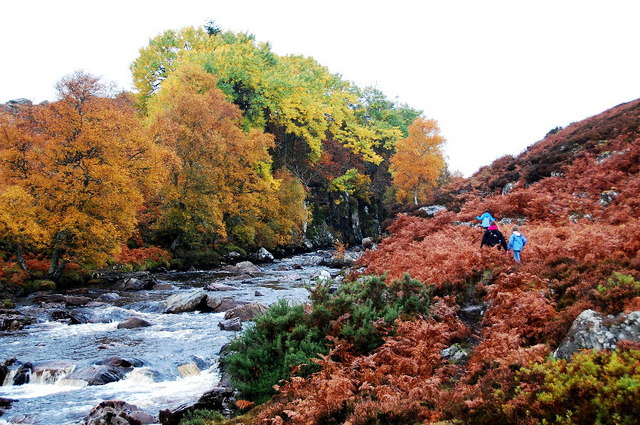
River Brora near West Langwell

The River Brora (Scottish Gaelic: Brùra) is an east-flowing river in Sutherland in the Highlands of Scotland. It is formed where its headwater streams, Allt Gobhlach and Allt nan Con-uisge meet. As a part of the Loch Shin Hydro Scheme, some of its flow is now diverted at Dalnessie into the Féith Osdail, a tributary of the River Tirry. It then flows southeastwards down Strath Brora to Dalreavoch. The river then briefly turns northeast and then east, before turning southeastwards once again to pass through the three distinct basins of Loch Brora to enter the Moray Firth on the North Sea at the town of Brora. Its one principal tributary is the Black Water which enters on its left bank at Balnacoil. The Black Water is itself fed by the River Skinsdale and the Coirefrois Burn.
