= Dornoch Castle =

Castle in northern Scotland, built 1500s

Coordinates: 57°52′47″N 4°01′47″W

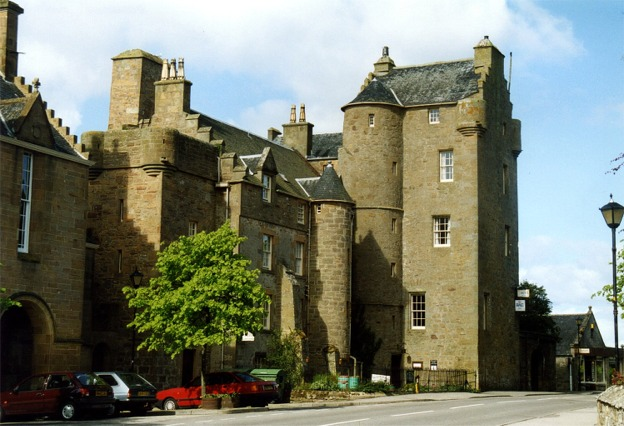
Dornoch Castle

Dornoch Castle is situated opposite Dornoch Cathedral in the town of Dornoch, Scotland.

The castle is operated as a family-run hotel with 24 rooms.

== History ==
Dornoch Castle, originally called the Palace of Dornoch, was built around 1500 as the home of the bishops of Caithness. In 1557, Bishop Robert Stewart gifted the building to John Gordon, 11th Earl of Sutherland and his heirs, who were made hereditary constables of the Palace of Dornoch, "situated in the Irish (Gaelic-speaking) country among the wild, unbridled, untamed, and savage Scots."

In 1570 the castle was set alight in a feud between the McKays and Murrays. At that time, the people of the town endured a week in the tower of the cathedral and in the castle.The rebuilding which followed included the addition of the upper part of the tower.

The Castle is believed to have been haunted by the ghost of the covenanter, Andrew McCornish, who was hanged for sheep stealing in the 17th century.

The castle decayed during the 18th century, but was restored between 1813 and 1814. In the first half of the 19th century, court hearings were held in a room in the tower of the castle, accessed by a spiral staircase, until Dornoch Sheriff Court was erected further to the east along Castle Street in 1850. Following extensive remodelling by William Fowler, the castle became a residence for George Sutherland-Leveson-Gower, 2nd Duke of Sutherland, in 1859.

Further alterations were made around 1880, including the heightening of the south-west block, and the addition of a three-storey east tower.

The castle was sold to a private developer in 1922 and was converted into a hotel in 1947. Facilities included 24 bedrooms, and some garden rooms, which were added in the 1970s. The castle is a category B listed building.

Since 2000, it has been in the ownership of the Thompson family, who also own and operate Dornoch distillery next to the hotel.
