= Samuel Claggett Chew =

American literary scholar (1888–1960)

Samuel Claggett Chew (August 31, 1888 – January 16, 1960) was a scholar of English literature and drama who taught at Bryn Mawr College.

== Education and teaching posts ==
Chew hailed from a prominent American family and was born in Baltimore. He received his bachelor's degree from Johns Hopkins in 1909 and earned the doctorate there in 1913: while at the university, he was elected to the Phi Beta Kappa honor society. As a young man, he came into contact with Horace Howard Furness, who served as a role model for him; the younger man dedicated his 1915 book, The Dramas of Lord Byron, to Furness. He revered the editor of The New Variorum Shakespeare for his "wisdom and benevolence and large-heartedness and sense of humor."

Chew began his teaching career at the high school level at the Gilman Country School in Baltimore in 1909. For the next two years he was a fellow at Johns Hopkins while studying for his doctorate. In 1913 he taught at the Hotchkiss School in Salisbury, Connecticut.

The academic institution to which he was to devote the majority of his professional life was Bryn Mawr College. Chew became an instructor in English there in 1914. Two years later he was promoted to the rank of associate professor. Later, he was made Mary Garrett Alumnae Professor of English. His position was named after an early proponent of women's right to vote. In total, he taught at the exclusive Pennsylvania women's college for more than 40 years.

Since Chew was well known in scholarly circles and published extensively, he was often invited to lecture at other universities, among them the University of Chicago, the University of Toronto, his alma mater Johns Hopkins, Western Reserve, and Harvard Universities. He also lectured at the Pierpont Morgan Library in New York. He was a visiting lecturer at Pomona College in 1954–55 and at the Claremont Graduate School from 1955 to 1957.

== Popular writing and book reviews ==
Chew was active as a critic and book reviewer. He wrote 3,000 book reviews in the field of English literature, many of them published in The New York Herald Tribune and The Nation. His last book review, concerning a two-volume edition of Coleridge's letters, appeared in the Herald Tribune the same day as his obituary.

In 1925 Chew won first prize, offered by The Saturday Review of Literature, for the best discussion of the way in which Joseph Conrad might have finished his fragmentary novel titled Suspense. He also wrote for Vanity Fair. This magazine offered prizes to those who could answer the dozens of questions Chew had assembled for the contest.

The book that made him most well known for a popular audience was the anthology titled Fruit Among the Leaves. It included parts of famous books published by the D. Appleton & Company publishers on the occasion of their 125th year in business. The firm went out of business in 1973.

He reviewed several of Thomas Hardy's works and corresponded with him. Chew's 1921 book on Hardy, said one scholar, "enhanced Hardy's prestige".

== Acknowledgements upon retirement ==
Johns Hopkins University conferred upon him the honorary degree of Doctor of Literature in 1950. The next year he was elected to the American Philosophical Society; reviews of the era referred to Chew as an "eminent scholar".

Erwin Panofsky, then teaching at Princeton, held a special lecture in honor of Chew's retirement from Bryn Mawr in 1954; the title was "Galileo as a Critic of the Arts".

After his 1954 retirement as Professor of English Literature at Bryn Mawr, Chew continued to lecture occasionally at the college.

== Personal life ==
His wife was Lucy Evans Chew, a graduate from Bryn Mawr College in 1918. Shortly after her graduation, she married Chew. For the majority of their married life, the Chews lived in the Bryn Mawr area; Samuel died in Bryn Mawr Hospital. Mrs. Chew left 58 volumes of her diaries from the years from 1920 to 1968 to Bryn Mawr's archives.

=== Book collector ===
Chew was a collector of rare books. He willed that two late medieval manuscripts from his collection be donated to the Bryn Mawr Library. One was a psalter he had purchased during a sabbatical in Europe in 1921; other books were given to him by his friend Howard Gray, a history professor at the same college.

== Major publications ==
- The Dramas of Lord Byron, 1915.
- Thomas Hardy, poet and novelist, 1921.
- Byron in England, 1924.
- The Crescent and the Rose (1937) was well received at the time of publication. Among literary scholars, the book is "usually seen as the pioneering discussion" of Islam in early modern English drama. It was reprinted five years (1965) after Chew's death and is still cited frequently.
- The Virtues Reconciled: An Iconographical Study, 1947.
- Literary History of England, 1948. Chew authored the fourth and last section: "Book IV: The Nineteenth Century and After".
- Chief Romantic Poets, 1950.
- The Pilgrimage of Life, 1962. Mrs. Chew oversaw the final editing process after her husband died. He had worked on the project over the course of 20 years.

He edited a volume of Tennyson's poems (titled Representative Poems) in 1941.
