= Brora =

Coordinates: 58.01°N 3.85°W

Brora: Scottish Gaelic: Brùra
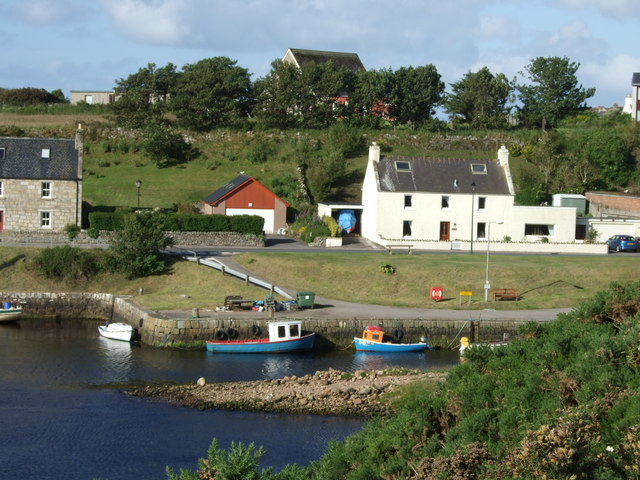
- Harbour Road, Brora

- Location within the Sutherland area
- Population: 1,210 (2020)
- OS grid reference: NC906039
- Council area: Highland
- Lieutenancy area: Sutherland
- Country: Scotland
- Sovereign state: United Kingdom
- Post town: BRORA
- Postcode district: KW9
- Dialling code: 01408
- Police: Scotland
- Fire: Scottish
- Ambulance: Scottish
- UK Parliament: Caithness, Sutherland and Easter Ross
- Scottish Parliament: Caithness, Sutherland and Ross constituency in the Highlands and Islands electoral region

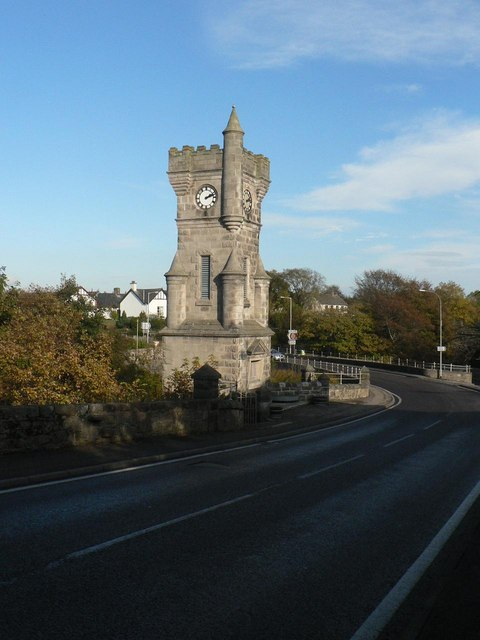
Clock Tower War Memorial, dedicated 1922

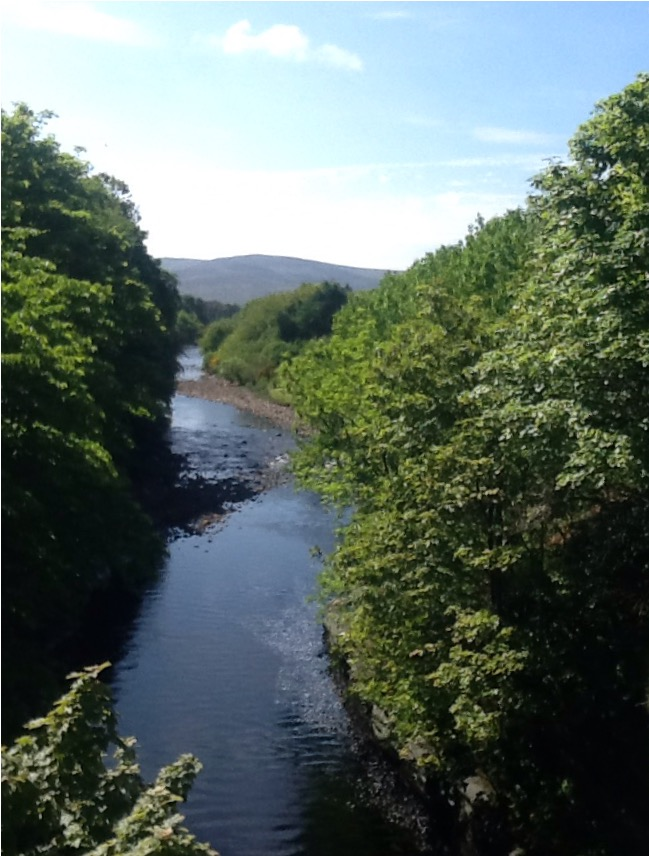
Brora River from Brora Bridge

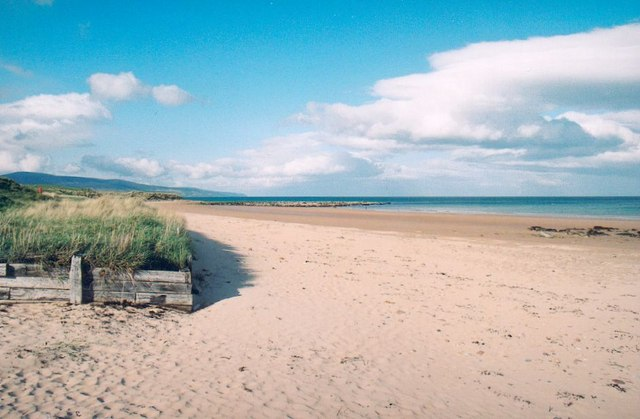
Brora Beach

Brora (/ˈbroʊrə/ ; Scottish Gaelic: Brùra) is a village in the east of Sutherland, in the Highland area of Scotland.

== Origin of the name ==
The name Brora is derived from Old Norse and means "river with a bridge".

== History ==
Brora is a small industrial village, having at one time a coal pit, boat building, salt pans, fish curing, lemonade factory, the new Clynelish Distillery (as well as the old Clynelish distillery which is now called the Brora distillery), wool mill, bricks and a stone quarry. The white sandstone in the Clynelish quarry belongs to the Brora Formation, of the Callovian and Oxfordian stages (formerly Middle Oolite) of the Mid-Late Jurassic. Stone from the quarry was used in the construction of London Bridge, Liverpool Cathedral and Dunrobin Castle. When in operation, the coalmine was the most northerly coalmine in the UK. A comparison of the first and second edition Six-inch Ordnance Survey maps gives an interesting picture of Brora's industrial development. Brora was the first place in the north of Scotland to have electricity thanks to its wool industry. This distinction gave rise to the local nickname of "Electric City" at the time. Brora also houses a baronial style clock tower which is a war memorial.

Like many of the smaller fishing ports, Brora's involvement with fishing declined in the years before the First World War. In the 1906 report by the Fishery Board we read that Brora was "becoming yearly more popular as a summer resort and declining as a fishing port. A considerable number of the fishermen find employment ashore as labourers during the greater part of the year".

Fishery Statistics

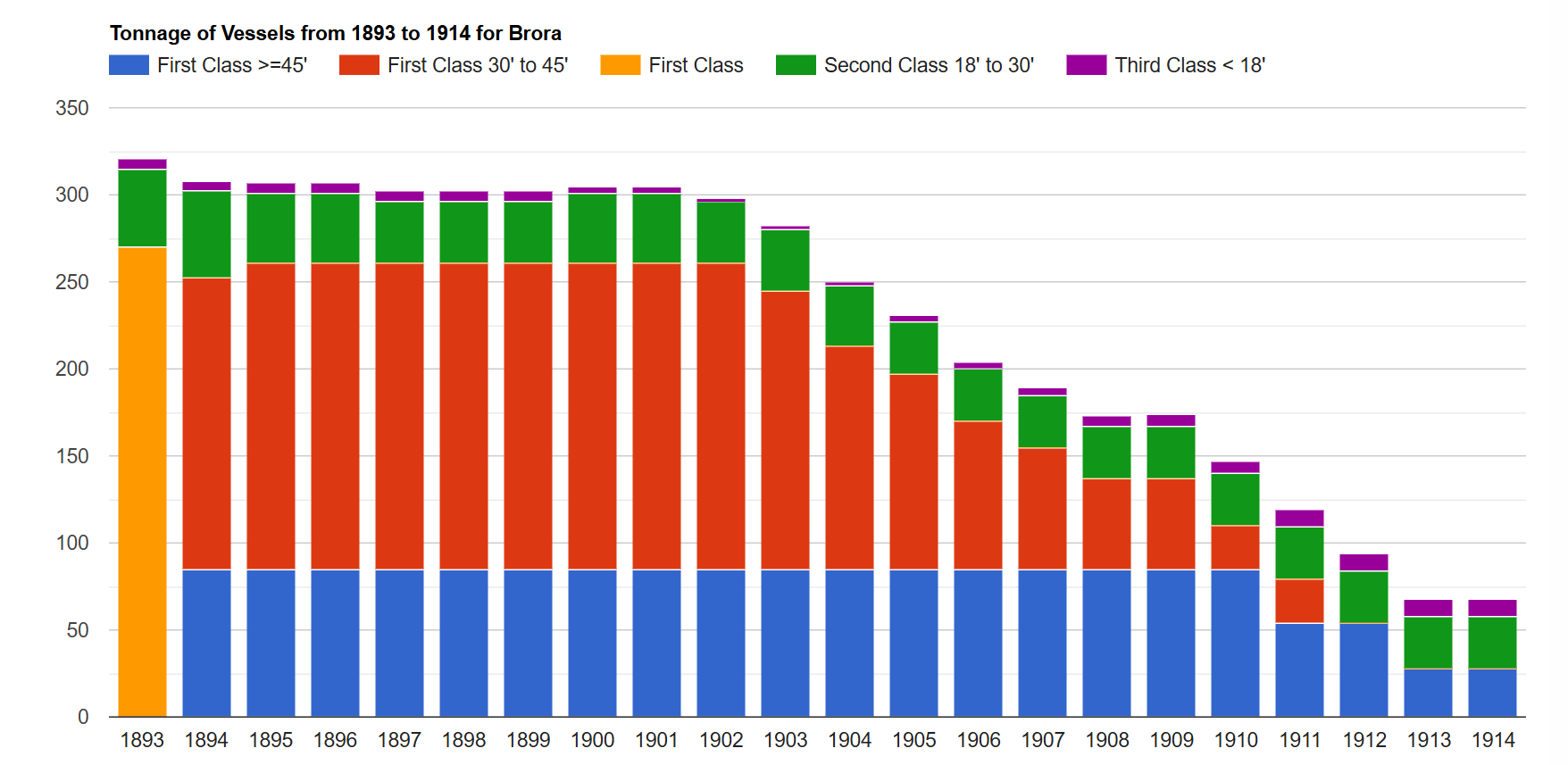
Tonnage of vessels

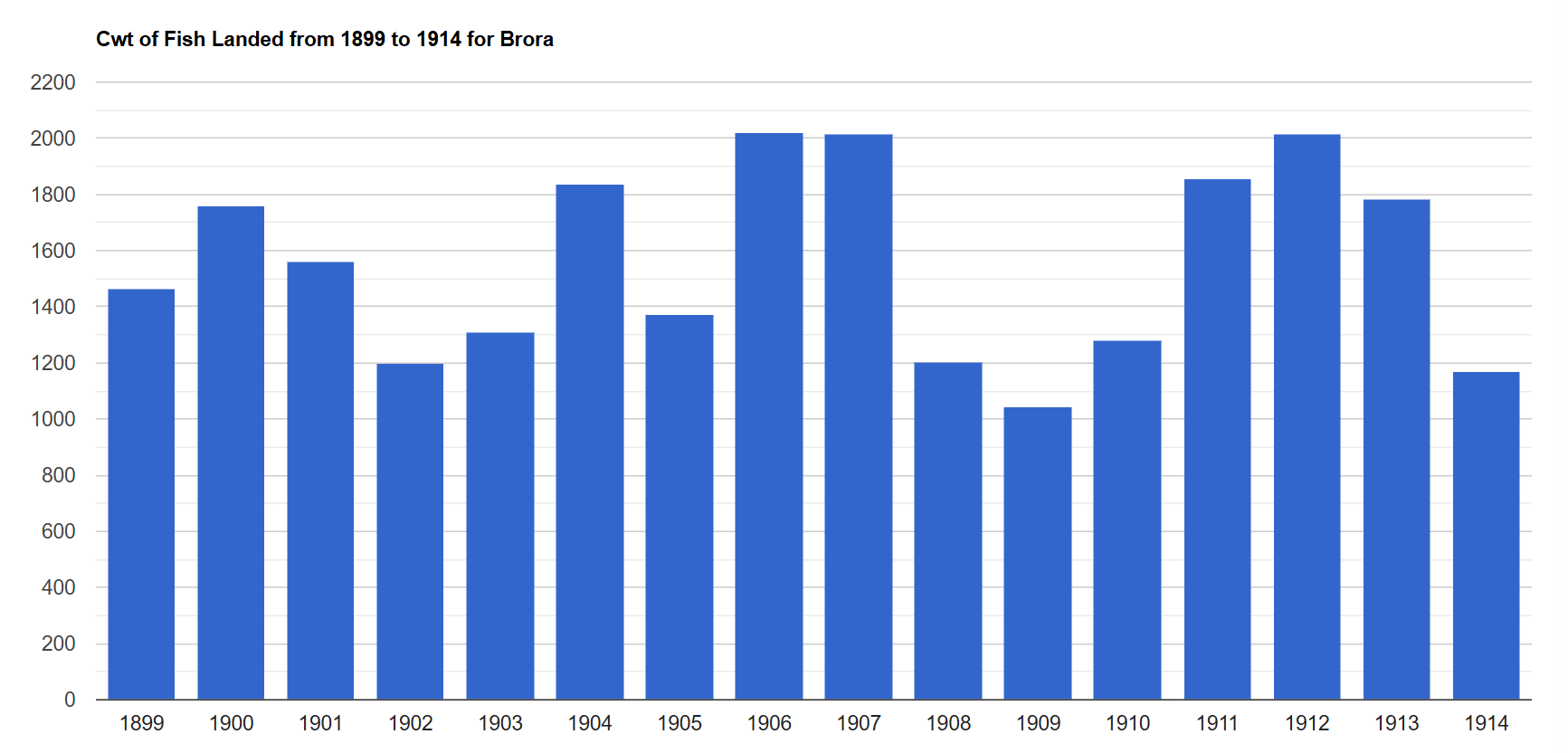
Cwt of fish landed

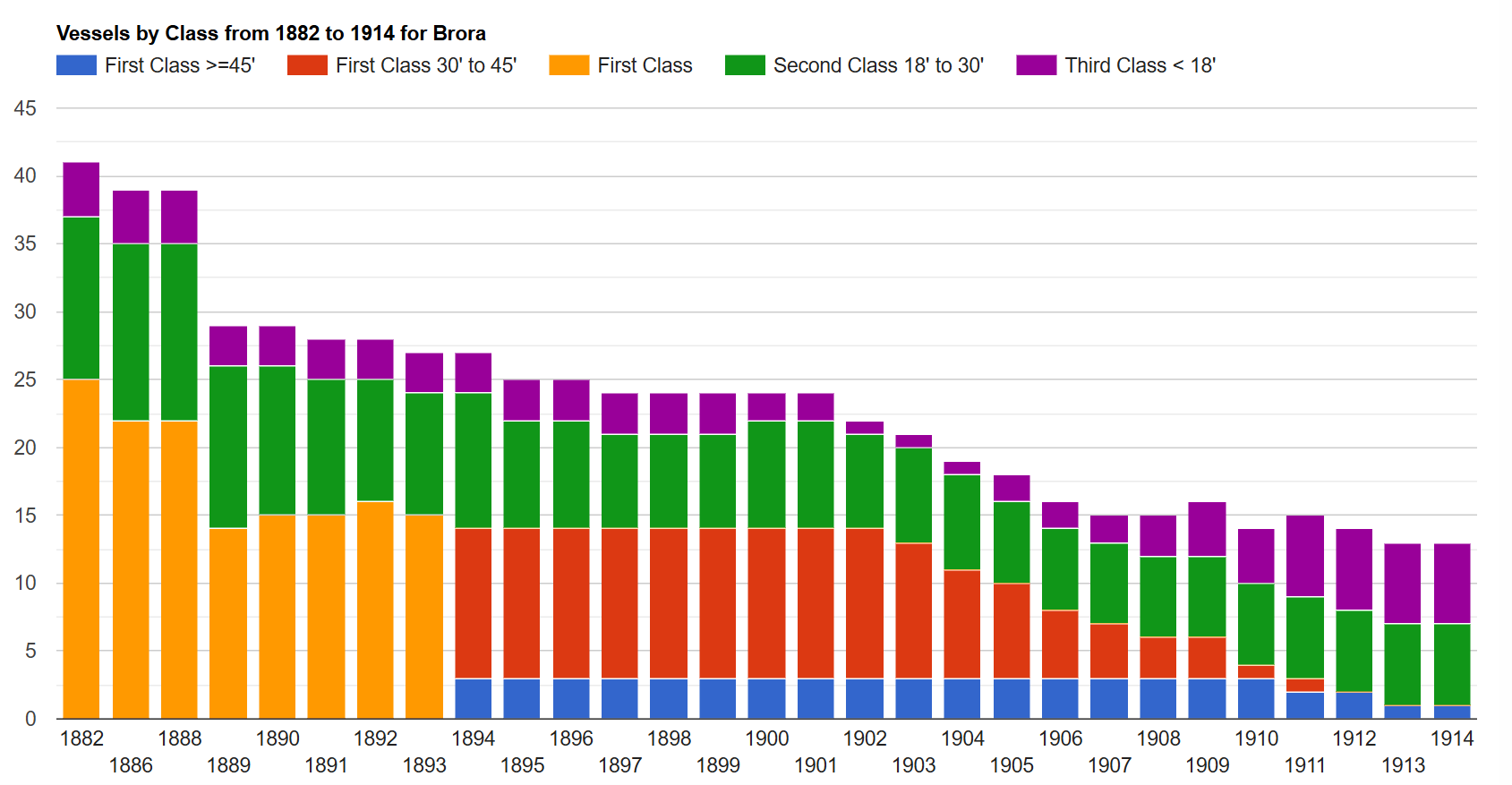
Vessels by class

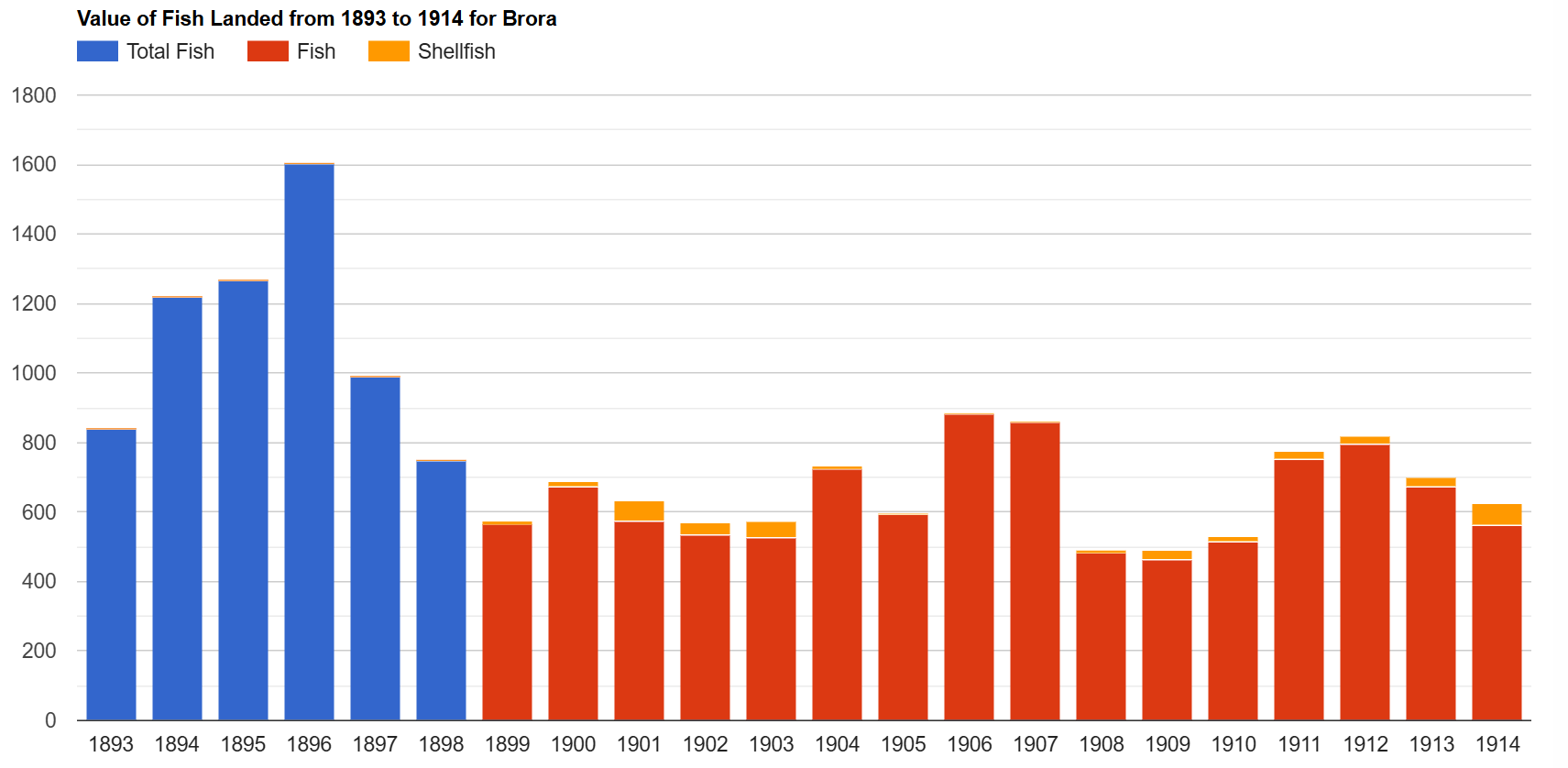
Value (£) of fish landed

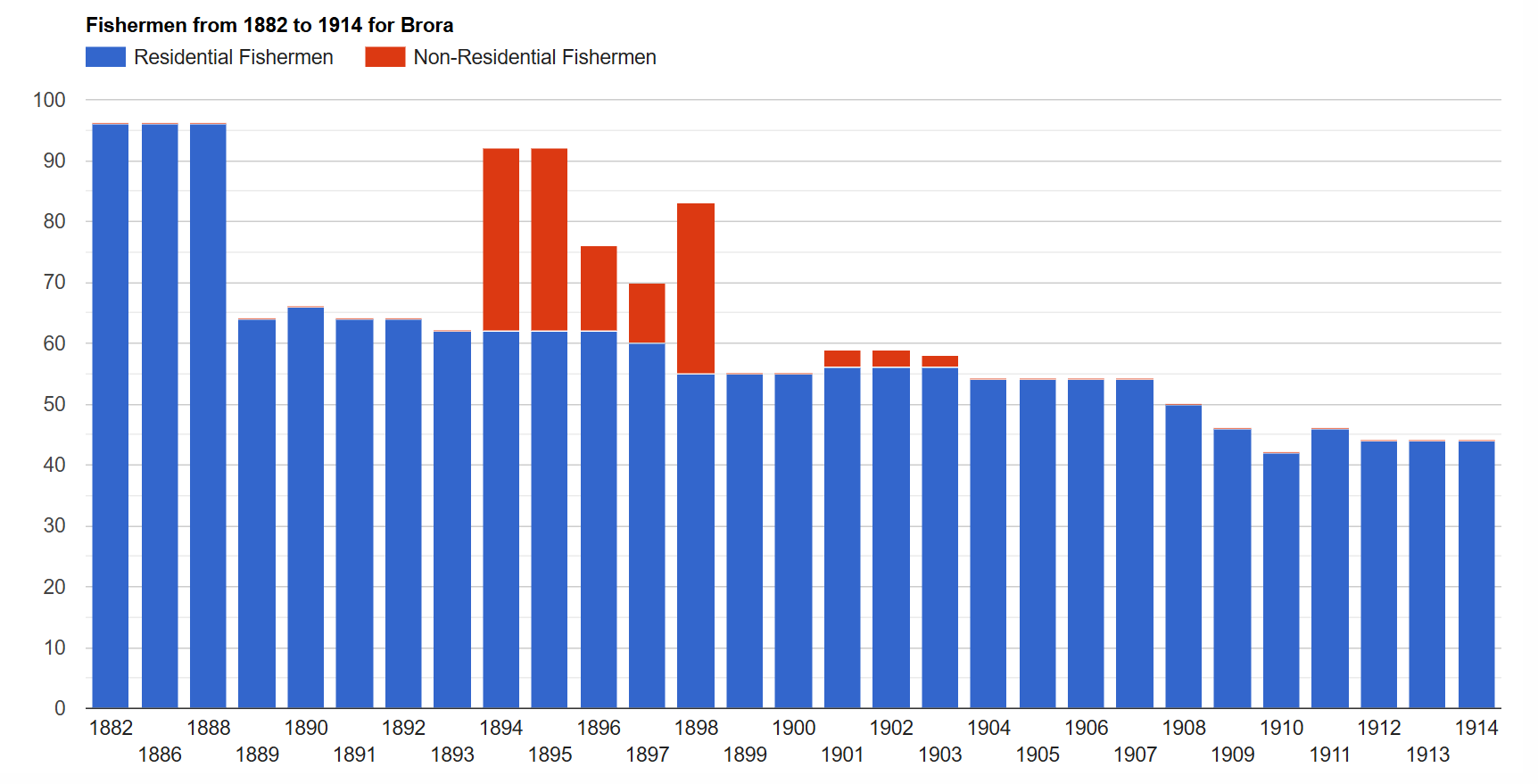
Fishermen

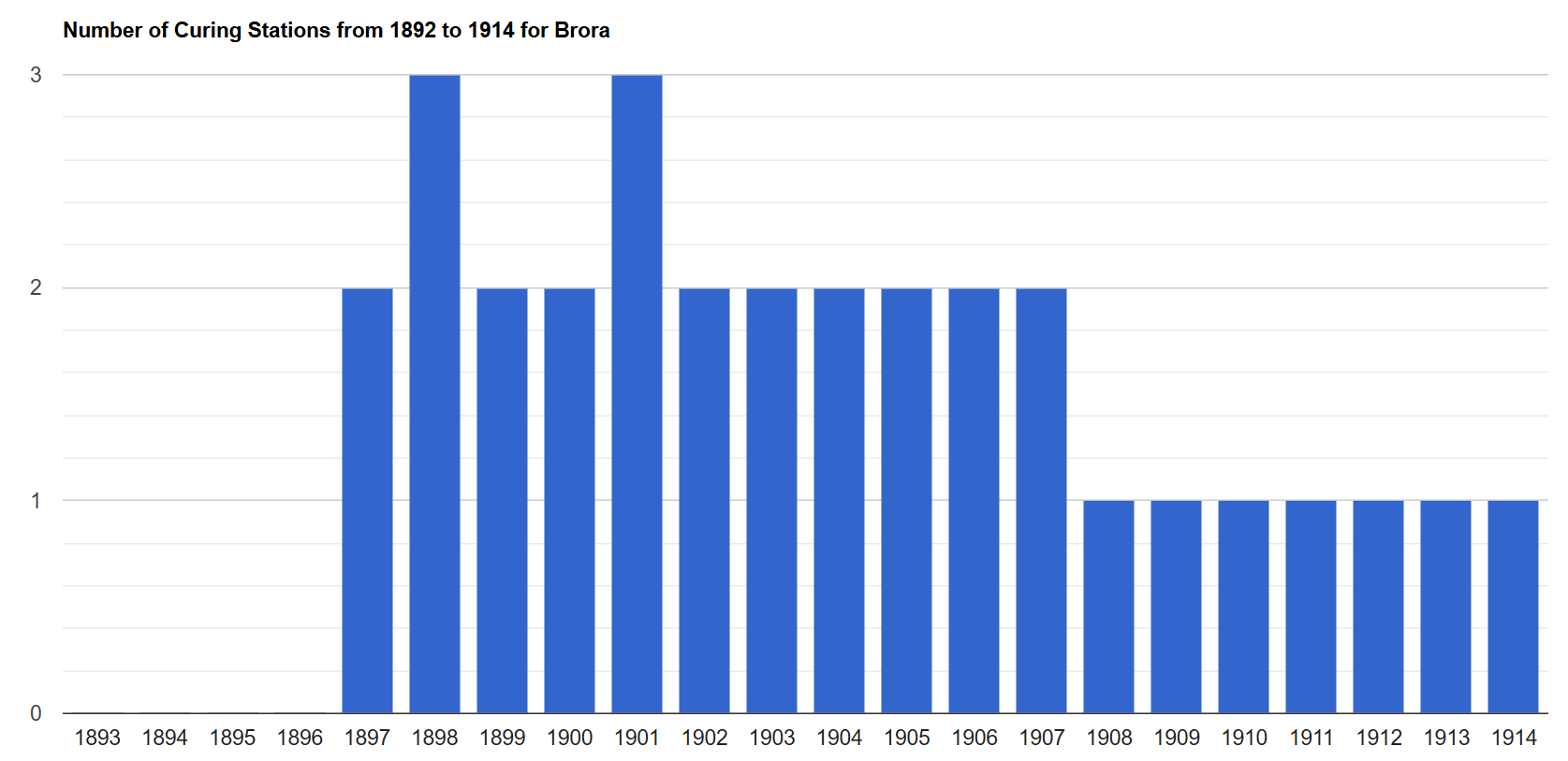
Number of curing stations

== Archaeology ==
In 2005, members of the Clyne Heritage Society (CHS) monitored structures eroding from the dunes on the Back Beach, south of the harbour. This was a pilot project for the Shorewatch programme, which aimed to train community groups to search for new archaeological sites and record information on them to be passed on to local and national archives. CHS members found a map, dated 1812, which depicts ‘Old Salt Pans’ marked at the position of the eroding structures. They also found records showing that the ‘Old Salt Pans’ were constructed in 1598 but had gone out of use within a few years.

== Transport ==
The village is situated where the A9 road and the Far North Line bridge the River Brora. The village is served by a railway station. Buses operate from Brora by the Stagecoach Highlands X99 service which runs 3 times a day each way during the week, twice a day each way on a Saturday and once a day each way on a Sunday. MacLeods Coaches from Rogart also operate the 906 service through Brora heading to Helmsdale one way and Lairg the other way several times a day during the week.

== Education ==
An education is available for primary school children in Brora Primary School in Johnstone Place. The building was formerly Brora High School, that included the primary department. Although the school opened in 1962, the secondary department closed in 1985. It includes a playgroup, nursery and Primaries 1 to 7. Older children are taken by school transportation to the nearby Golspie High School.

== Sport ==
Brora Rangers F.C. were founded in 1879 and have been members of the Highland Football League since 1962. They moved to their present stadium, Dudgeon Park, in 1922.

Amongst the local amenities are an 18-hole links golf course designed by James Braid in 1923. There are also bowling and tennis facilities in the village.

== Government listening station ==
To the south-east of the village is the former Brora Y Station which operated as a Government listening station between 1940 and 1986.

== Notable people from Brora ==
- Megan Boyd (1915–2001), fly-tier.
- William John Cameron (1907–1990), twice Moderator of the General Assembly of the Free Church of Scotland
- Isabella Gordon Mackay was born near here in the 1770s. She created support for Presbyterians in Nova Scotia sending teachers, ministers and more.
