= Golspie High School =

- Àrd-sgoil Ghoillspidh

Location
- Main Street; Golspie, KW10 6RF; Scotland; 57.9756°N 3.9732°W

Information
- Motto: Go hard or go home
- Established: 1963
- School district: Sutherland
- Local authority: Highland
- Rector: Catherine Brown
- Staff: 35
- Age: 11 to 18
- Houses: Broch, Raven, & Orion
- Colours: Green, Yellow and red
- Website: golspiehigh.org.uk

Golspie High School (Scottish Gaelic: Àrd-sgoil Ghoillspidh) is a secondary school in Golspie, in Sutherland in the north of Scotland.

In 2023 there were 264 pupils on the school roll. Pupils are from a catchment area that is particularly vast, stretching as far north as Kinbrace, as far south as the Mound and as far west as Rosehall. Before the opening of Kinlochbervie High School in 1995, pupils attended Golspie as weekly boarders. Golspie High is part of the Golspie, Invergordon & Tain associated school group.

== Feeder schools ==
Primary schools in Brora, Golspie, Helmsdale, Lairg, Rogart and Rosehall send pupils to Golspie.

== Notable former pupils ==
- Jimmy Yuill, actor
- Lewis Williamson, racing driver
- Alexander 'Zander' Sutherland, footballer
