= Dornoch =

Town in Highlands, Scotland

Coordinates: 57.88°N 4.03°W

Dornoch: Scottish Gaelic: Dòrnach; Scots: Dornach
- Town
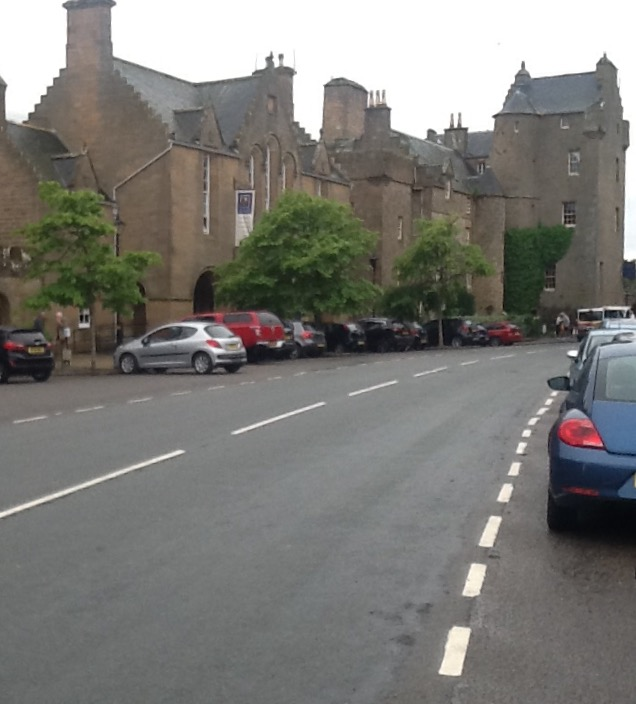
- Dornoch Sheriff Court (left) and Dornoch Castle (right)

- Location within Scotland
- Population: 1,415 (2022)
- OS grid reference: NH798896
  - Edinburgh: 195 miles (314 km)
- Council area: Highland Council
- Lieutenancy area: Sutherland
- Country: Scotland
- Sovereign state: United Kingdom
- Post town: DORNOCH
- Postcode district: IV25
- Dialling code: 01862
- Police: Scotland
- Fire: Scottish
- Ambulance: Scottish
- UK Parliament: Caithness, Sutherland and Easter Ross
- Scottish Parliament: Caithness, Sutherland and Ross; Highlands and Islands

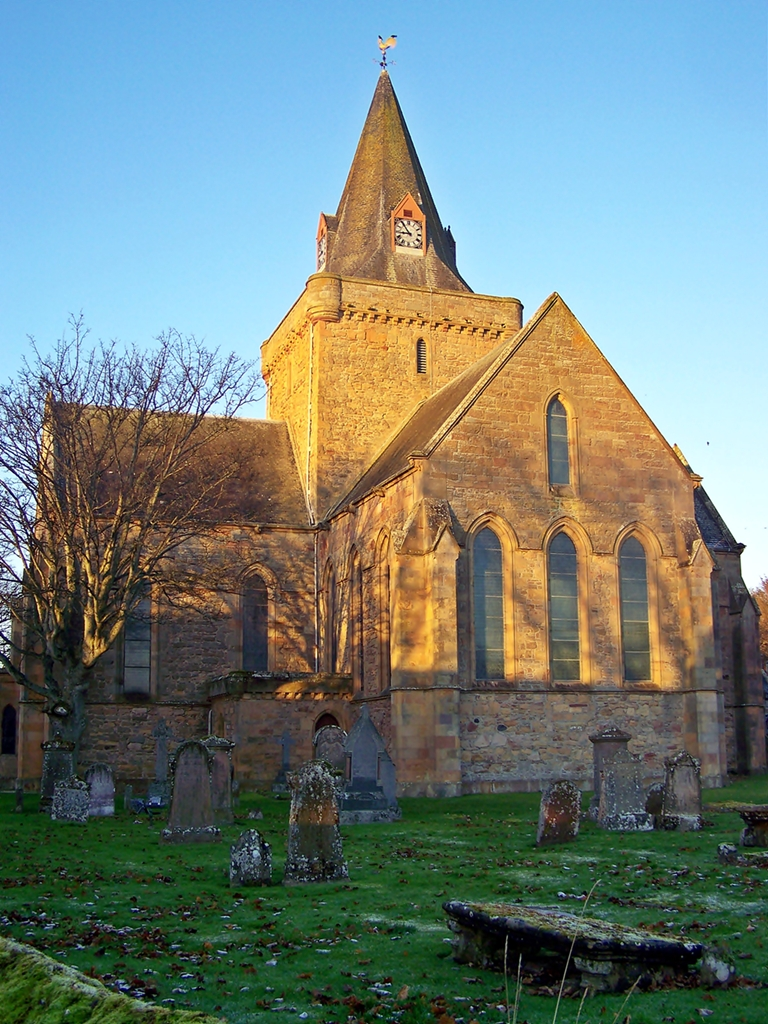
Dornoch Cathedral

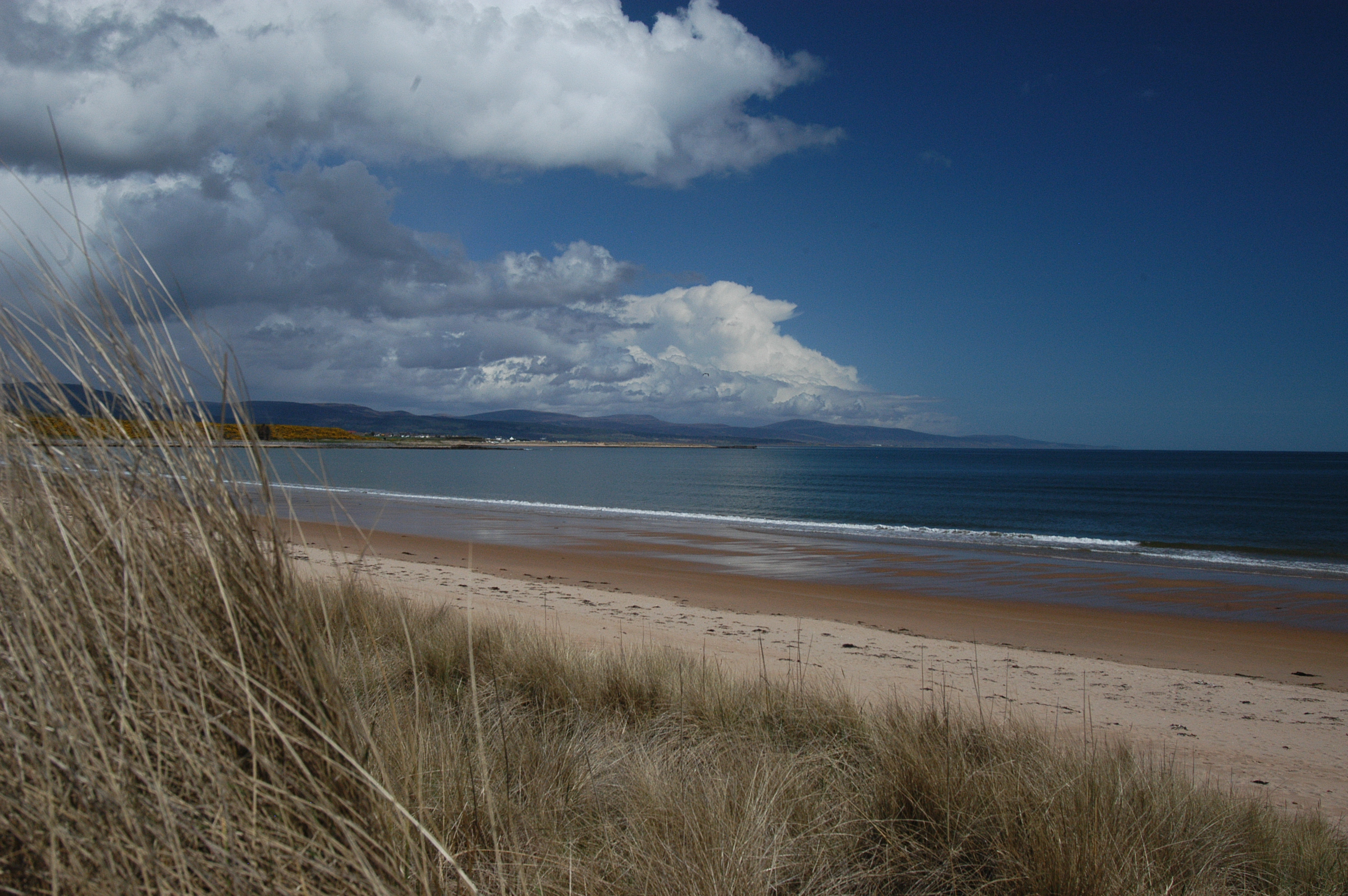
Dornoch Beach

Dornoch (/ˈdɔːrnɒx/; Scottish Gaelic: Dòrnach [ˈt̪ɔːrˠn̪ˠəx]; Scots: Dornach) is a seaside resort town, parish and former royal burgh in the county of Sutherland in the Highlands of Scotland. It lies on the north shore of the Dornoch Firth, near to where it opens into the Moray Firth to the east.

Dornoch is approximately 195 miles (314 km) north-northwest of Edinburgh, 139 miles (224 km) north-northeast of Glasgow, and 29 miles (47 km) north of Inverness. It had a population of 1,415 in 2022. It is the only town in the county of Sutherland.

== Etymology ==
The name 'Dornoch' is derived from the Gaelic for 'pebbly place', suggesting that the area contained pebbles the size of a fist (dorn) which could therefore be used as weapons.

== History ==
Archaeological excavations during the development of a new business park in 1997 revealed a building, evidence for ironworking and part of a whale, dating from the 8th to the 11th centuries AD. The archaeologists surmised that the findings were of an industrial area on the edge of a settlement and that a settlement existed at Dornoch from at least the 8th century.

The first direct reference to a settlement in Dornoch is not until the early 12th century when David I, as recorded in the Dunfermline Abbey register, orders Rognvald, the Earl of Orkney, to respect the monks at Dornoch.

Dornoch has the thirteenth-century Dornoch Cathedral, the Old Town Jail, Dornoch Sheriff Court and Dornoch Castle, which is now a hotel.

It is also notable as the last place a witch was burnt in Scotland. Her name was reported as Janet Horne; she was tried and condemned to death in 1727. There is a stone, the Witch's Stone, commemorating her death, inscribed with the year 1722.

On 13 January 2005, Dornoch was granted Fairtrade Town status.

== Economy ==
Royal Dornoch Golf Club was founded in 1877. It was named No. 2 on the 2024 Golf Digest list of Top 100 International (outside U.S.) courses.

Dornoch distillery has been operating at the former 19th century fire station house since 2016.

== Education ==
The town is home to Dornoch Primary School and Dornoch Academy secondary school.

The Burghfield House Campus of the University of the Highlands and Islands in Dornoch is the home for the Centre for History, teaching undergraduate and postgraduate history degrees to students around the UHI network and worldwide.

== Governance ==
=== Local Government ===
The town is part of the East Sutherland and Edderton ward of Highland Council which elects three Councillors.

A community council called Dornoch Area Community Council is also active in the town.

=== Scottish Parliament ===
In the Scottish Parliament, since 2011 Dornoch has been part of the Caithness, Sutherland and Ross constituency. Since 2026, the constituency MSP has been David Green of the Liberal Democrats.

It is also one of eight constituencies in the Highlands and Islands Scottish Parliament electoral region, which elects seven additional members, in addition to eight constituency MSPs, to produce a form of proportional representation for the region as a whole.

=== UK Parliament ===
Dornoch has been part of the Caithness, Sutherland and Easter Ross constituency from 1997. Since 2017, the MP has been Jamie Stone of the Liberal Democrats.

== Transport ==
The town is near the A9 road, to which it is linked by the A949 and the B9168. The town also has a grass air strip suitable for small aircraft and helicopters.

Dornoch was connected to the railway network by the Dornoch Light Railway. The railway was opened on 2 June 1902. It closed on 13 June 1960. The station building for Dornoch railway station still stands today and is used as a commercial retail unit.

== In popular culture ==
Rosamunde Pilcher's last novel Winter Solstice is largely set in and around Dornoch, fictionalised under the name of Creagan.

== Notable people ==
- Margaret C. Davidson led the National Union of Women's Suffrage Societies
- Donald Ross a professional golfer and golf course designer.
