= Skelbo railway station =

Former railway station in Scotland

Coordinates: 57.926584°N 4.027437°W

Skelbo
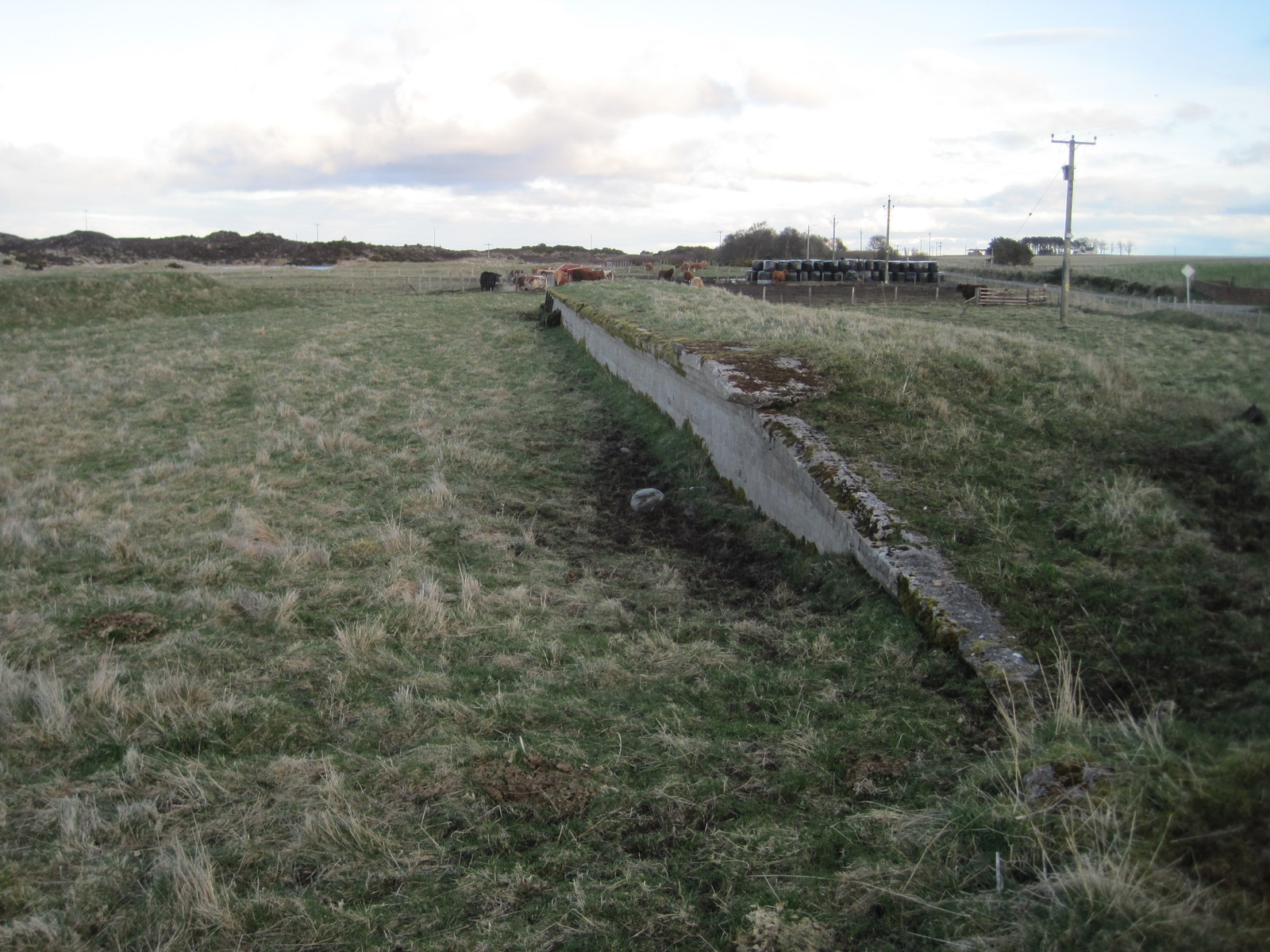
- Remains of Skelbo station platform

General information
- Location: Scotland
- Platforms: 1

Other information
- Status: Disused

History
- Pre-grouping: Highland Railway
- Post-grouping: London, Midland and Scottish Railway; British Railways

Key dates
- 2 June 1902: Opened
- 13 June 1960: Closed
Location

Skelbo railway station was a halt on the Dornoch Light Railway serving the village of Skelbo in Sutherland, Scotland.

== History ==
The station was opened in 1902 and was located on the southern shore of Loch Fleet east of a level crossing point which provided track access to the pier to Littleferry. A house immediately to the west of the crossing was sold by the Duke of Sutherland for use of the gate keeper.

The station was on the Dornoch Light Railway, a branch railway which was later incorporated into the London, Midland and Scottish Railway (in 1923) and the Scottish Region of British Railways in 1948. James Farquhar, formerly chief goods clerk at Nairn railway station, was appointed the first agent of the company.

The station closed on 13 June 1960. The track of the Dornoch Light Railway was lifted during the spring and summer of 1962. A diesel engine assisted in the removal of the line and was to remain in the siding at Skelbo Halt until it was removed by road in early August of that year. The waiting shelter from Skelbo station still survives but is now located in a field to the west at Cambusmore. The station platform still survives, together with two of the level-crossing gate posts and the cutting to the north of the gate keeper's cottage, which is now a private dwelling.

== Other stations on the branch line ==
- The Mound – junction.
- Cambusavie Platform
- Embo
- Dornoch

== See also ==
- List of closed railway stations in Britain
