= Langwell =

Langwell may refer to:

- East Langwell, settlement in the Scottish Highlands
- West Langwell, settlement in the Scottish Highlands
- The fictional Langwell river in The Lord of the Rings.
- An Intel codename for a particular Platform Controller Hub.
