= Embo railway station =

Former railway station in Scotland

Coordinates: 57.909851°N 4.003644°W

Embo
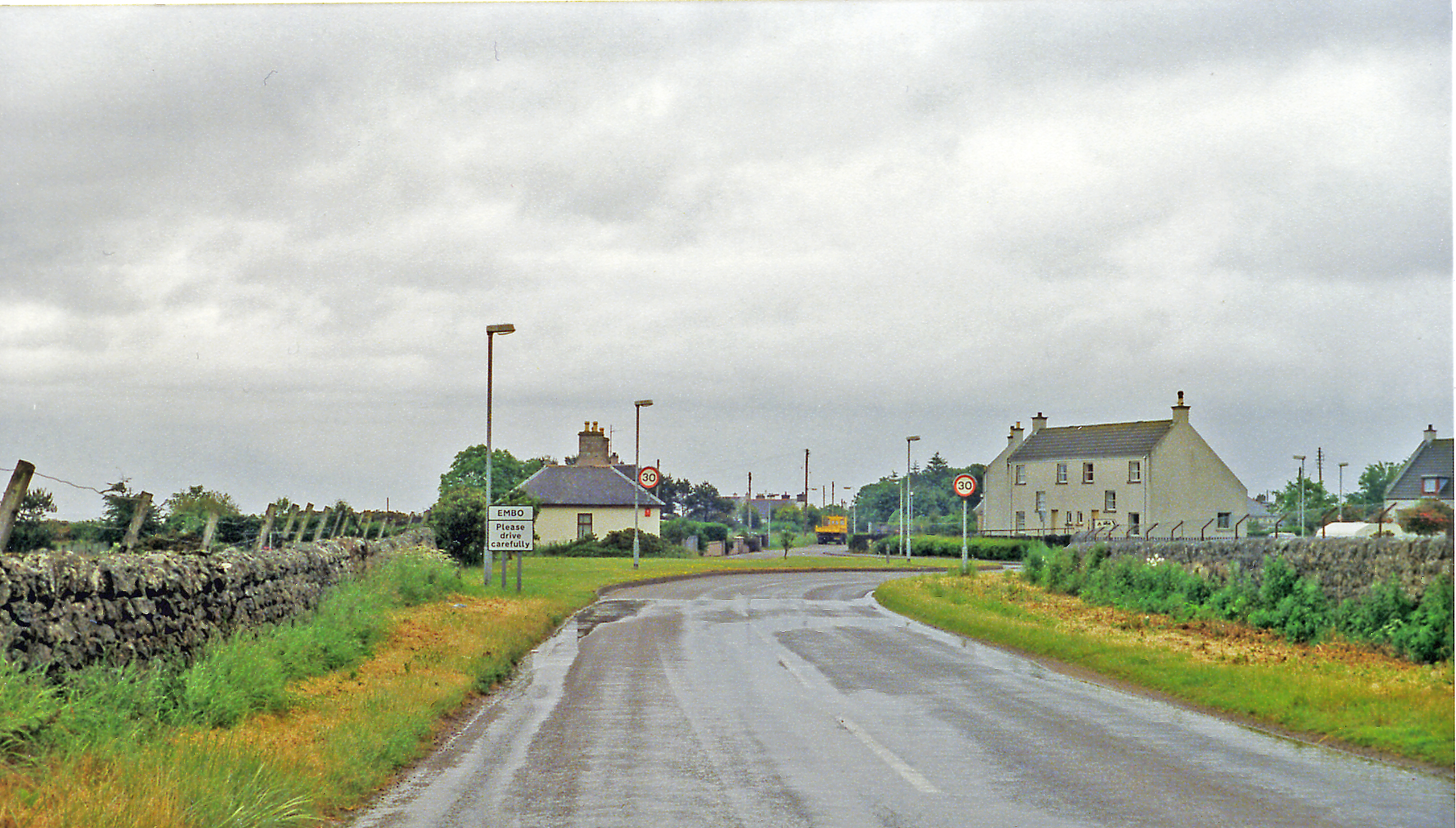
- The site of Embo station

General information
- Location: Scotland
- Platforms: 1

Other information
- Status: Disused

History
- Pre-grouping: Highland Railway
- Post-grouping: London, Midland and Scottish Railway; British Railways

Key dates
- 2 June 1902: Opened
- 13 June 1960: Closed
Location

Embo railway station formerly served the town of Embo in Sutherland, Scotland.

== History ==
The station was opened in 1902. James Craig, formerly at Dalcross railway station was appointed the first agent of the company.

The station was on the Dornoch Light Railway, a branch railway which was later incorporated into the London, Midland and Scottish Railway (in 1923) and the Scottish Region of British Railways in 1948.

The station closed on 13 June 1960.

== Other stations on the branch line ==
- The Mound - junction.
- Cambusavie Platform
- Skelbo
- Dornoch

== See also ==
- List of closed railway stations in Britain
