= Rogart railway station =

Railway station in Highland, Scotland

Rogart Scottish Gaelic: Sgìre Raoird
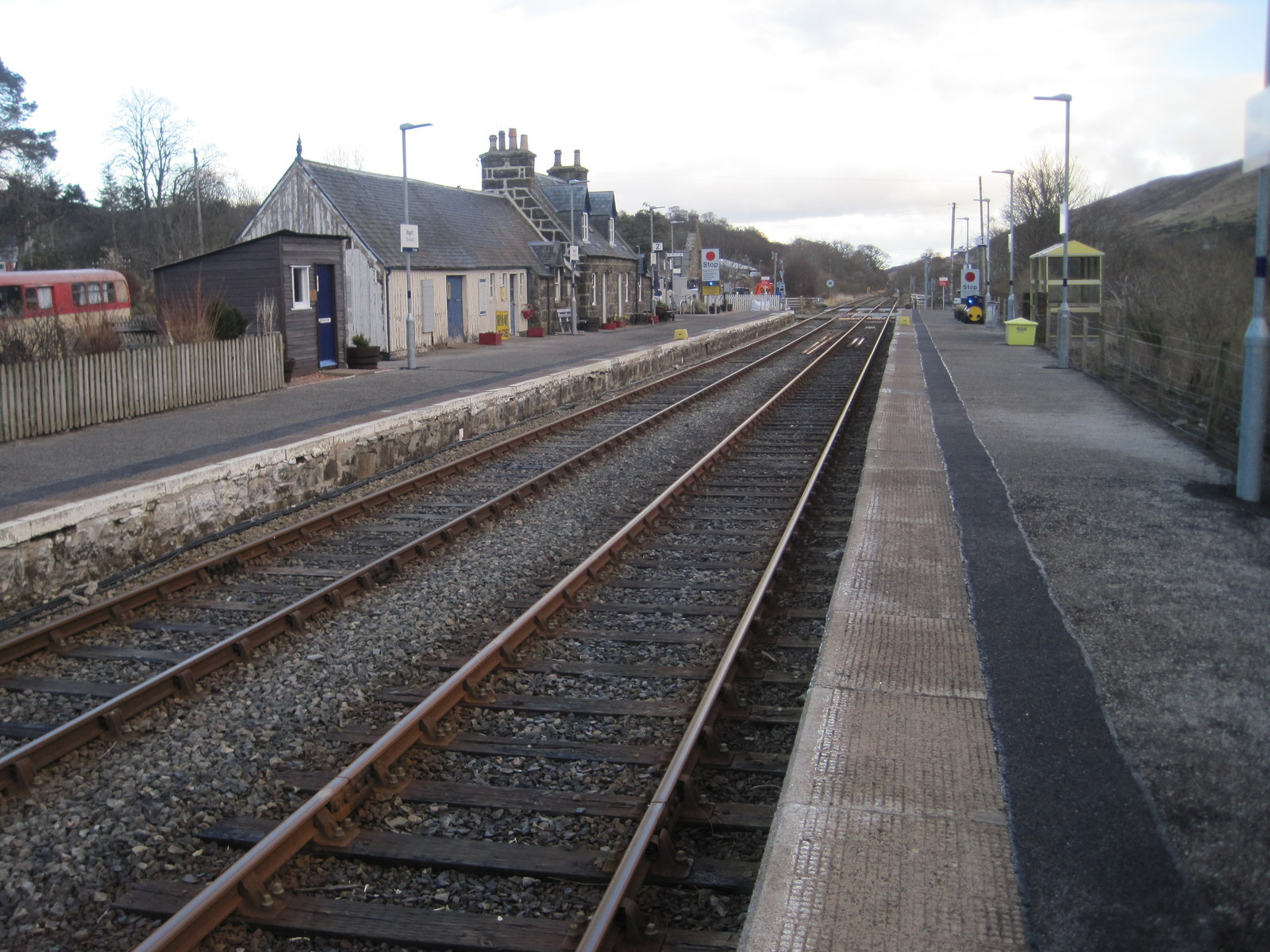
- The station in 2015, looking east towards Golspie

General information
- Location: Rogart, Highland; Scotland
- Coordinates: 57.9886°N 4.1584°W
- Grid reference: NC724019
- Manager: ScotRail
- Platforms: 2

Other information
- Station code: ROG

History
- Original company: Sutherland Railway
- Pre-grouping: Highland Railway
- Post-grouping: London, Midland and Scottish Railway; British Railways

Key dates
- 13 July 1868: Opened as Rogart
- 13 June 1960: Closed
- 6 March 1961: Reopened
- 12 June 1961: Renamed Rogart Halt
- 17 May 1982: Renamed Rogart

Passengers
- 2021/22: ▲992
- 2022/23: ▼884
- 2023/24: ▲1,226
- 2024/25: ▼1,084
- 2025/26: ▼1,068
Location
Notes
- Passenger statistics from the Office of Rail and Road

Rogart railway station is a railway station serving the villages of Rogart and Pittentrail, in the Highland council area of Scotland. The station is on the Far North Line, 77 miles 1 chain (123.9 kilometres) from Inverness, between Golspie and Lairg. ScotRail, who manage the station, operate all services.

== History ==
The Sutherland Railway opened between Bonar Bridge and Golspie on 13 April 1868. Among the intermediate stations was one at Rogart, which opened with the line.

In common with six other stations north of Bonar Bridge (now Ardgay), the station at Rogart was closed on 13 June 1960 with the intention of making economies; but the cuts were seen as too drastic, and Rogart station alone was reopened on 6 March 1961. Three months later, on 12 June 1961, it was renamed Rogart Halt, but reverted to Rogart on 17 May 1982.

== Facilities ==
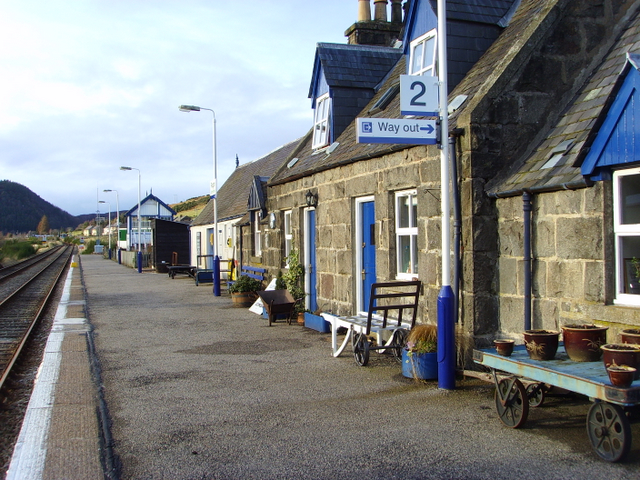
Rogart station in 2008

The station has benches on both platforms, with a shelter on platform 1, and a waiting area on platform 2. there are also bike racks and a help point on platform 2, as well as a small car park adjacent to platform 2. There are no facilities to purchase tickets, passengers must buy one in advance, or from the guard on the train. Three old railway coaches offer accommodation, with discounts for those arriving and leaving by train.

On 20 December 2022, Transport Scotland introduced a new "Press & Ride" system at Rogart, following successful trials of the system at Scotscalder over the previous four months. Previously, passengers wishing to board a train at Rogart had to flag the train by raising their arm (as is still done at other request stops around the country); this meant that the driver needed to reduce the train's speed before a request stop (to look out for any potential passengers on the platform and be able to stop if necessary), even if the platform was empty. The new system consists of an automatic kiosk (with a button for passengers to press) at the platforms; this will alert the driver about any waiting passengers in advance and, if there is no requirement to stop, the train can maintain line speed through the request stops, thus improving reliability on the whole line.

== Passenger volume ==
Passenger Volume at Rogart
	2004–05	2005–06	2006–07	2007–08	2008–09	2009–10	2010–11	2011–12	2012–13	2013–14	2014–15	2015–16	2016–17	2017–18	2018–19	2019–20	2020–21	2021–22	2022–23	2023–24	2024–25
Entries and exits	1,633	1,645	1,356	1,472	1,538	1,844	1,456	1,736	1,662	1,662	1,522	1,710	1,948	1,630	1,574	1,656	150	992	884	1,226	1,084

The statistics cover twelve month periods that start in April.

== Services ==
The station sees 4 trains to Inverness and 4 trains to Wick, on weekdays and Saturdays. On Sundays this drops to just 1 train each way.

Preceding station	National Rail	Following station
Lairg	ScotRail; Far North Line	Golspie
	Historical railways	
Lairg; Line and station open	Highland Railway; Sutherland Railway	The Mound; Line open, station closed

== Bibliography ==
- Brailsford, Martyn, ed. (December 2017) [1987]. Railway Track Diagrams 1: Scotland & Isle of Man (6th ed.). Frome: Trackmaps. ISBN 978-0-9549866-9-8.
- Butt, R. V. J. (October 1995). The Directory of Railway Stations: details every public and private passenger station, halt, platform and stopping place, past and present (1st ed.). Sparkford: Patrick Stephens Ltd. ISBN 978-1-85260-508-7. OCLC 60251199. OL 11956311M.
- Quick, Michael (2023). Railway Passenger Stations in Great Britain: A Chronology (PDF) (5th ed.). London: Railway and Canal Historical Society.
- Vallance, H.A.; Clinker, C.R.; Lambert, Anthony J. (1985) [1938]. The Highland Railway (4th ed.). Newton Abbot: David & Charles. ISBN 0-946537-24-0.
- Yonge, John (December 2007) [1987]. Jacobs, Gerald (ed.). 1: Scotland & Isle of Man. Railway Track Diagrams (5th ed.). Bradford on Avon: Trackmaps. ISBN 978-0-9549866-3-6.
