= Eastfield =

Eastfield may refer to:

== United Kingdom ==
=== England ===
- Eastfield, Bristol, a location
- Eastfield, Northumberland, a location
- Eastfield, North Yorkshire
- Eastfield, Peterborough in Cambridgeshire
- Eastfield, South Yorkshire, a location

=== Scotland ===
- Eastfield, Cumbernauld, a suburb of Cumbernauld, North Lanarkshire, name used in addition to/as alternative to Balloch
- Eastfield, Edinburgh
- Eastfield, Harthill, a village associated with Harthill, North Lanarkshire
- Eastfield, Scottish Borders, a location
- Eastfield, South Lanarkshire (part of the Rutherglen/Cambuslang urban area)
- Eastfields, a 2010s development in Carntyne, Glasgow

== United States ==
- Eastfield Mall in Springfield, Massachusetts, used interchangeably with the surrounding retail district
- Eastfield College, a community college in Mesquite, Texas

== See also ==
- East Field (disambiguation)
- Eastfields, an area in the London Borough of Merton
  - Mitcham Eastfields railway station, serving the above locality
