= Dornoch railway station =

Former railway station in Scotland

Coordinates: 57.8825°N 4.0280°W

Dornoch
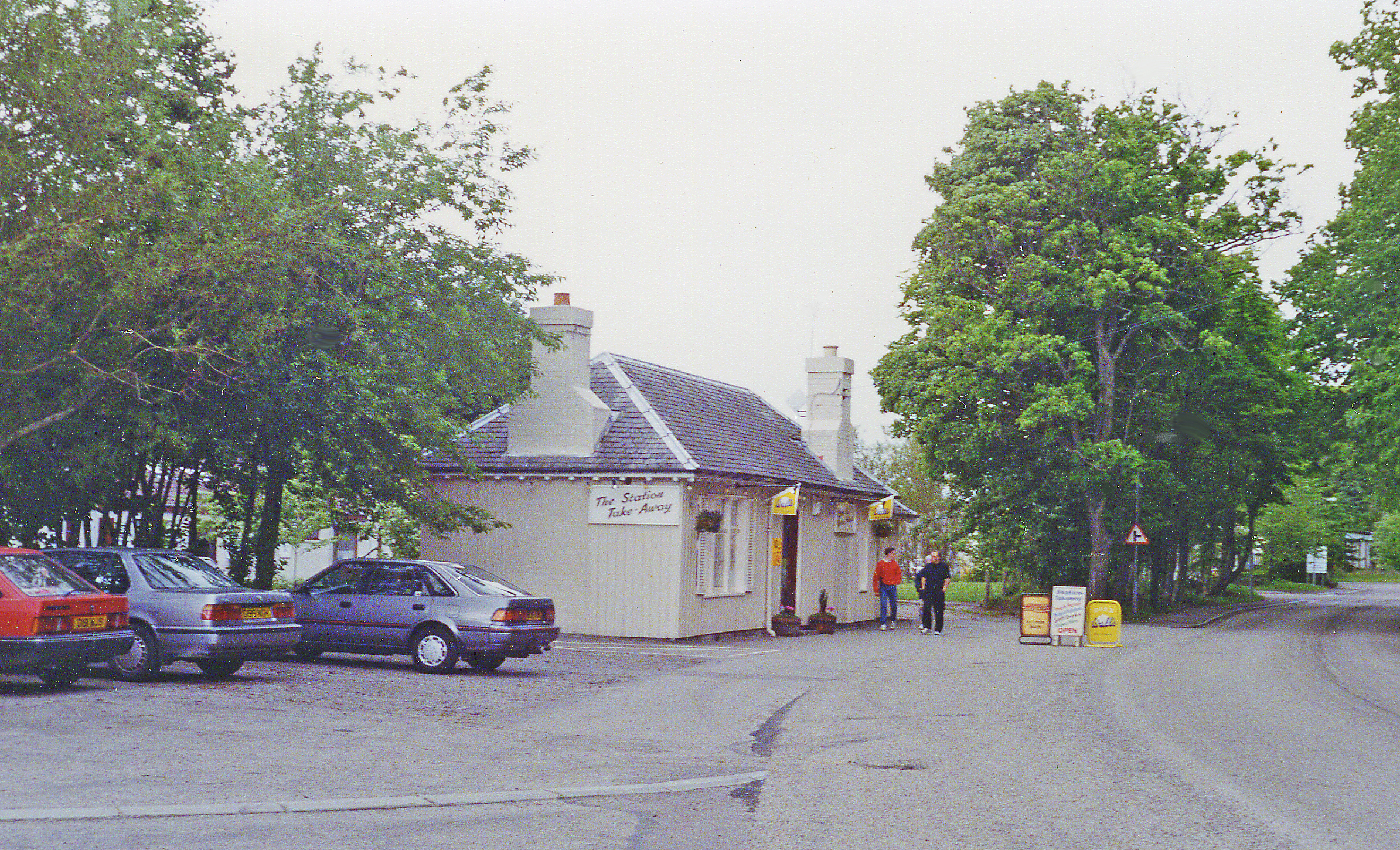
- The former station in 1994

General information
- Location: Scotland
- Platforms: 1

Other information
- Status: Disused

History
- Pre-grouping: Highland Railway
- Post-grouping: London, Midland and Scottish Railway; British Railways

Key dates
- 2 June 1902: Opened
- 13 June 1960: Closed
Location

Dornoch railway station formerly served the town of Dornoch in Sutherland, Scotland.

== History ==
The station was opened in 1902. Donald Mackenzie, formerly station master at Georgemas Junction railway station was appointed first station master of Dornoch. The station was situated near Dornoch Cathedral.

The station was the terminus of the Dornoch Light Railway, a branch railway which was later incorporated into the London, Midland and Scottish Railway (in 1923) and the Scottish Region of British Railways in 1948.

The station closed on 13 June 1960.

== Other stations on the branch line ==
- The Mound - junction.
- Cambusavie Platform
- Skelbo
- Embo

== See also ==
- List of closed railway stations in Britain
