= Easington =

Easington may refer to one of several places:

in England

- Easington, Lancashire, Forest of Bowland
- Easington, County Durham, a town in County Durham
  - Easington District, a district from 1974 to 2009
  - Easington (UK Parliament constituency), constituency represented in the British House of Commons
  - Easington Rural District, a district in County Durham from 1894 to 1974
  - Easington Colliery, a village in County Durham
  - Easington Lane, a village in County Durham
- Easington, Buckinghamshire
- Easington, Cherwell
- Easington, East Riding of Yorkshire, the location of the Easington Gas Terminal
- Easington, South Oxfordshire
- Easington, North Yorkshire
- Easington, Northumberland

elsewhere

- Easington, Jamaica

== See also ==
- Eastington (disambiguation)
