= Leigh East =

Leigh East may refer to:

- Leigh East A.R.L.F.C., an amateur rugby league team from Leigh, England
- Leigh East (ward), an electoral ward in Leigh, England

== See also ==
- Eastleigh (disambiguation)
