= Cambusavie Platform railway station =

Disused railway station in Highland, Scotland

Coordinates: 57.944376°N 4.078099°W

Cambusavie
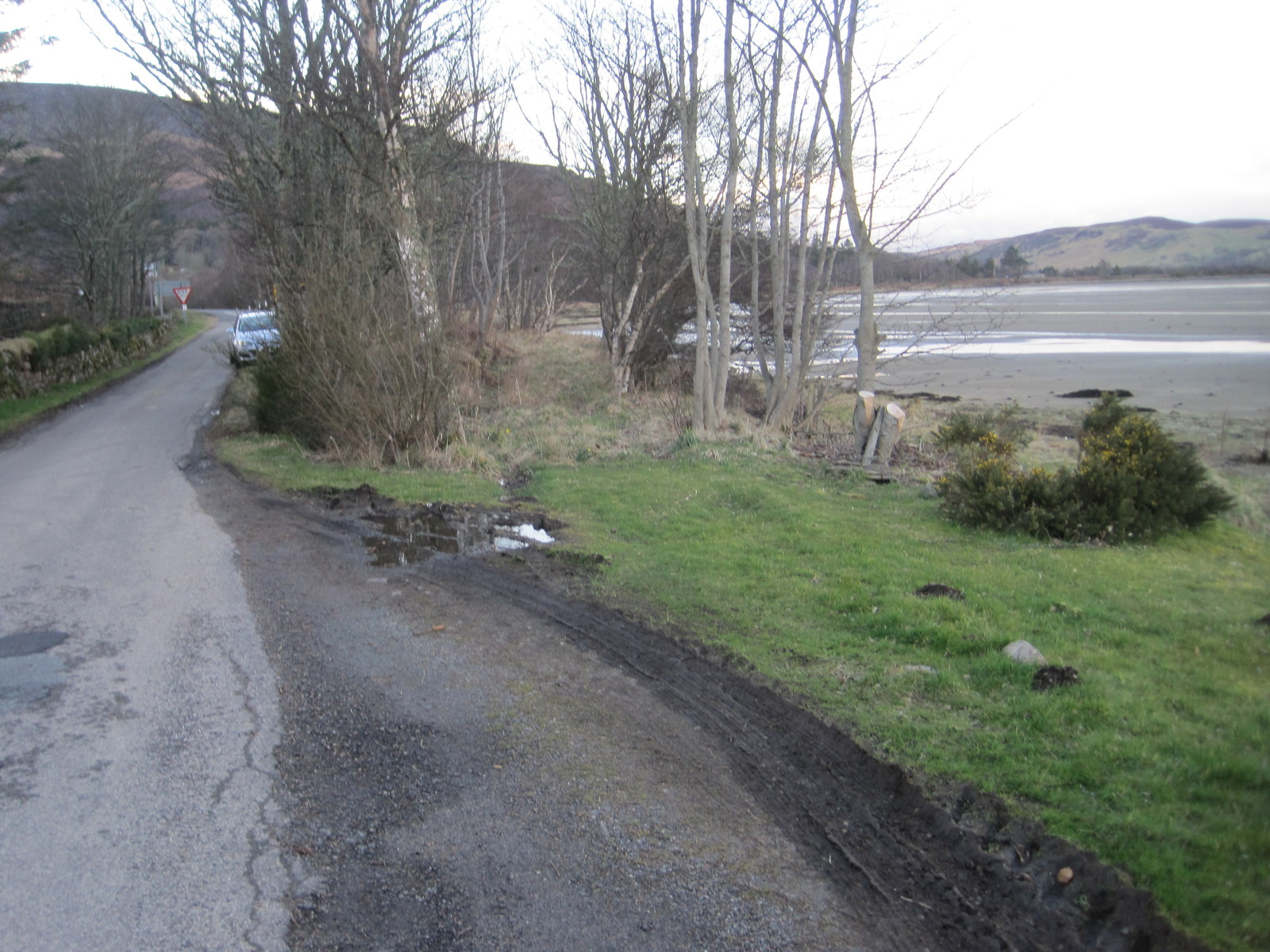

General information
- Location: Scotland
- Platforms: 1

Other information
- Status: Disused

History
- Pre-grouping: Highland Railway
- Post-grouping: London, Midland and Scottish Railway; British Railways

Key dates
- 2 June 1902: Opened
- 13 June 1960: Closed
Location

Cambusavie platform formerly served Cambusavie in Sutherland, Scotland.

== History ==
The station was opened in 1902. It was a request stop only. The station was on the Dornoch Light Railway, a branch railway which was later incorporated into the London, Midland and Scottish Railway (in 1923) and the Scottish Region of British Railways in 1948.

The station closed on 13 June 1960.

== Other stations on the branch line ==
- The Mound - junction.
- Skelbo
- Embo
- Dornoch

== See also ==
- List of closed railway stations in Britain
