= Pittentrail =

Coordinates: 57.9894°N 4.15711°W

Pittentrail: Scottish Gaelic: Bad an Tràill
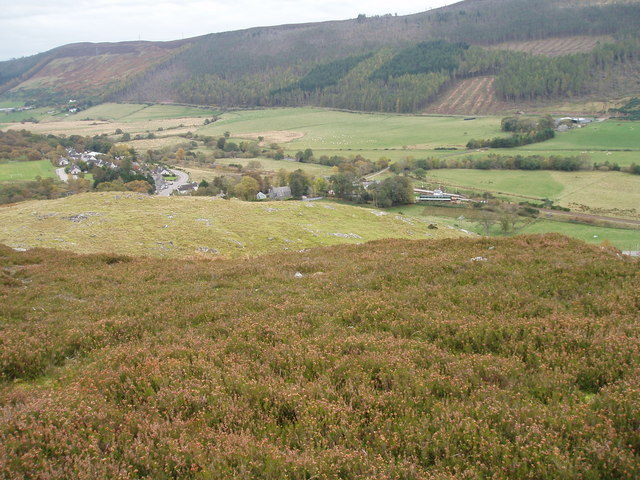

- Location within the Sutherland area
- OS grid reference: NC725020
- Council area: Highland
- Lieutenancy area: Sutherland
- Country: Scotland
- Sovereign state: United Kingdom
- Post town: Rogart
- Postcode district: IV28 3
- Police: Scotland
- Fire: Scottish
- Ambulance: Scottish
- UK Parliament: Caithness, Sutherland and Easter Ross
- Scottish Parliament: Caithness, Sutherland and Ross

Pittentrail (Scottish Gaelic: Bad an Tràill or Baile an Tràill) is a hamlet on the A839 road, in the Rogart parish in east Sutherland, in the Scottish Highlands. The River Fleet runs to the south. The settlement became better known in the area when Rogart railway station was built in the village. The station is still in use and operates as a request stop on the Far North Line, but the station buildings have been converted into private residential use. The station yard has been made into gardens, with old signs and other railway memorabilia lying about. The original sidings have been retained, and the train carriages sitting on them converted into a youth hostel. The lively Pittentrail Inn is on the north side of the village, near the war memorial.

== Etymology ==
Etymologically speaking, the first element the name Pittentrail is pett, a Pictish word borrowed into Gaelic meaning "land-holding, unit of land". The second is Gaelic tràill, another loan-word, from the Old Norse for "thrall, slave". A neolithic chambered cairn was located in the hamlet next to the former Pittentrail Inn but was built at some point after 1909.
