= Eastleigh (disambiguation) =

Eastleigh is a town in Hampshire, England.

Eastleigh may also refer to:

- Eastleigh, the town in Hampshire, England.
  - Borough of Eastleigh, local government area around the town
  - Eastleigh F.C.
  - Eastleigh (constituency)
- Eastleigh, Devon, a location in North Devon, England
- Eastleigh, Nairobi, Kenya, eastern suburb of the city
  - RAF Eastleigh, former airbase in the suburb
- East Leigh, Mid Devon, England
- Astley, Greater Manchester, England
