= Eastington =

Eastington may refer to the following places in England:

- Eastington, Devon
- Eastington, Cotswold, Gloucestershire, near Northleach
- Eastington, Stroud, Gloucestershire, near Stonehouse
