= List of United Kingdom locations: East E-East L =

The United Kingdom

This is part of the list of United Kingdom locations: a gazetteer of place names in the United Kingdom showing each place's locality and geographical coordinates.

== East E ==
Location	Locality	Coordinates (links to map & photo sources)	OS grid reference
East Ella	East Riding of Yorkshire	53.74°N 00.40°W	TA0529
East End (Wilden)	Bedfordshire	52.18°N 00.39°W	TL1055
East End (Cranfield)	Bedfordshire	52.06°N 00.60°W	SP9642
East End	Buckinghamshire	51.85°N 00.82°W	SP8118
East End	Dorset	50.78°N 02.01°W	SY9998
East End (Ulrome)	East Riding of Yorkshire	53.99°N 00.21°W	TA1757
East End (Preston)	East Riding of Yorkshire	53.75°N 00.19°W	TA1930
East End (Halsham)	East Riding of Yorkshire	53.72°N 00.04°W	TA2927
East End	Essex	51.72°N 00.89°E	TM0007
Eastend	Essex	51.77°N 00.05°E	TL4210
East End	Gloucestershire	51.69°N 01.78°W	SP1500
East End (East Boldre)	Hampshire	50.77°N 01.49°W	SZ3697
East End (East Woodhay)	Hampshire	51.34°N 01.41°W	SU4161
East End (West Meon)	Hampshire	51.01°N 01.08°W	SU6424
East End	Hertfordshire	51.92°N 00.10°E	TL4527
East End (Benenden)	Kent	51.08°N 00.61°E	TQ8335
East End (Minster)	Kent	51.42°N 00.81°E	TQ9673
East End (Headcorn)	Kent	51.15°N 00.64°E	TQ8543
East End	Milton Keynes	52.08°N 00.62°W	SP9444
East End	North Somerset	51.42°N 02.74°W	ST4870
Eastend (Chadlington)	Oxfordshire	51.89°N 01.52°W	SP3322
East End (Combe)	Oxfordshire	51.83°N 01.39°W	SP4215
East End (Hook Norton)	Oxfordshire	51.99°N 01.49°W	SP3533
East End (Adderbury)	Oxfordshire	52.01°N 01.31°W	SP4735
East End (North Leigh)	Oxfordshire	51.82°N 01.43°W	SP3914
East End (South Cadbury)	Somerset	51.02°N 02.52°W	ST6325
East End (Stoke St Michael)	Somerset	51.21°N 02.47°W	ST6746
East End (Chewton Mendip)	Somerset	51.25°N 02.58°W	ST5951
East End	South Gloucestershire	51.45°N 02.31°W	ST7873
East End (Stonham Apsal)	Suffolk	52.18°N 01.14°E	TM1559
East End (East Bergholt)	Suffolk	51.96°N 01.05°E	TM1034
East End Green	Hertfordshire	51.77°N 00.13°W	TL2910
Easter Aberchalder	Highland	57.23°N 04.38°W	NH5619
Easter Ardross	Highland	57.72°N 04.30°W	NH6373
Easter Balgedie	Perth and Kinross	56.21°N 03.33°W	NO1703
Easter Balmoral	Aberdeenshire	57.03°N 03.22°W	NO2694
Easter Binzean	Perth and Kinross	56.80°N 03.44°W	NO1269
Easter Boleskine	Highland	57.26°N 04.47°W	NH5122
Easter Compton	South Gloucestershire	51.53°N 02.62°W	ST5782
Easter Essendy	Perth and Kinross	56.57°N 03.38°W	NO1543
Eastergate	West Sussex	50.83°N 00.66°W	SU9405
Easterhouse	City of Glasgow	55.86°N 04.11°W	NS6865
Easter Housebyres	Scottish Borders	55.62°N 02.74°W	NT5337
Easter Howgate	Midlothian	55.86°N 03.21°W	NT2464
Easter Kilwhiss	Fife	56.27°N 03.16°W	NO2810
Easter Kinkell	Highland	57.56°N 04.39°W	NH5755
Easter Kinsleith	Fife	56.35°N 03.08°W	NO3318
Easter Knox	Angus	56.54°N 02.68°W	NO5839
Easter Langlee	Scottish Borders	55.60°N 02.77°W	NT5135
Easter Lednathie	Angus	56.75°N 03.09°W	NO3363
Easter Meathie	Angus	56.60°N 02.88°W	NO4646
Easter Quarff	Shetland Islands	60.09°N 01.24°W	HU4235
Easterside	Middlesbrough	54.53°N 01.22°W	NZ5016
Easter Skeld	Shetland Islands	60.18°N 01.44°W	HU3144
Easter Softlaw	Scottish Borders	55.58°N 02.39°W	NT7532
Easterton	Wiltshire	51.29°N 01.97°W	SU0255
Easterton Sands	Wiltshire	51.29°N 01.98°W	SU0155
Eastertown	Somerset	51.28°N 02.94°W	ST3454
East Everleigh	Wiltshire	51.27°N 01.71°W	SU2053
East Ewell	Surrey	51.34°N 00.23°W	TQ2362

== East F ==
Location	Locality	Coordinates (links to map & photo sources)	OS grid reference
East Farleigh	Kent	51.25°N 00.47°E	TQ7353
East Farndon	Northamptonshire	52.45°N 00.95°W	SP7185
East Fen Common	Cambridgeshire	52.33°N 00.34°E	TL6073
East Ferry	North Lincolnshire	53.48°N 00.78°W	SK8199
Eastfield	Barnsley	53.51°N 01.56°W	SE2902
Eastfield	Cambridgeshire	52.57°N 00.23°W	TL2099
Eastfield	City of Bristol	51.49°N 02.62°W	ST5777
Eastfield (Harthill)	North Lanarkshire	55.85°N 03.77°W	NS8964
Eastfield (Cumbernauld)	North Lanarkshire	55.94°N 04.01°W	NS7474
Eastfield	Northumberland	55.08°N 01.57°W	NZ2777
Eastfield	North Yorkshire	54.24°N 00.40°W	TA0484
Eastfield	Scottish Borders	55.54°N 02.73°W	NT5428
Eastfield	South Lanarkshire	55.82°N 04.20°W	NS6261
Eastfield Hall	Northumberland	55.34°N 01.65°W	NU2206
East Fields	Berkshire	51.39°N 01.32°W	SU4766
East Finchley	Barnet	51.58°N 00.18°W	TQ2689
East Finglassie	Fife	56.17°N 03.19°W	NT2699
East Firsby	Lincolnshire	53.35°N 00.49°W	TF0085
East Fleet	Dorset	50.61°N 02.52°W	SY6380

== East G ==
Location	Locality	Coordinates (links to map & photo sources)	OS grid reference
East Garforth	Leeds	53.79°N 01.37°W	SE4133
East Garston	Berkshire	51.48°N 01.48°W	SU3676
Eastgate	Cambridgeshire	52.56°N 00.23°W	TL2098
Eastgate	Durham	54.73°N 02.07°W	NY9538
Eastgate	Lincolnshire	52.76°N 00.36°W	TF1020
Eastgate	Norfolk	52.76°N 01.17°E	TG1423
East Gateshead	Gateshead	54.96°N 01.59°W	NZ2663
East Ginge	Oxfordshire	51.57°N 01.36°W	SU4486
East Gores	Essex	51.87°N 00.72°E	TL8823
East Goscote	Leicestershire	52.71°N 01.05°W	SK6413
East Grafton	Wiltshire	51.33°N 01.64°W	SU2560
East Green	Hampshire	51.18°N 00.87°W	SU7944
East Green (Kelsale)	Suffolk	52.23°N 01.51°E	TM4065
East Green (Great Bradley)	Suffolk	52.15°N 00.45°E	TL6853
East Greenwich	Greenwich	51.498°N 00.006°E	TQ392796
East Grimstead	Wiltshire	51.04°N 01.68°W	SU2227
East Grinstead	West Sussex	51.12°N 00.01°W	TQ3938
East Guldeford	East Sussex	50.95°N 00.74°E	TQ9321

== East H ==
Location	Locality	Coordinates (links to map & photo sources)	OS grid reference
East Haddon	Northamptonshire	52.30°N 01.03°W	SP6668
East Hagbourne	Oxfordshire	51.58°N 01.23°W	SU5388
Easthall	Hertfordshire	51.88°N 00.27°W	TL1922
East Halton	North Lincolnshire	53.65°N 00.29°W	TA1319
Eastham	Worcestershire	52.30°N 02.51°W	SO6568
East Ham	Newham	51.52°N 00.04°E	TQ4283
Eastham	Wirral	53.31°N 02.97°W	SJ3580
Eastham Ferry	Wirral	53.32°N 02.96°W	SJ3681
East Hampnett	West Sussex	50.84°N 00.70°W	SU9106
Easthampstead	Berkshire	51.39°N 00.76°W	SU8667
Easthampton	Herefordshire	52.26°N 02.88°W	SO4063
East Hanney	Oxfordshire	51.63°N 01.40°W	SU4193
East Hanningfield	Essex	51.68°N 00.55°E	TL7701
East Hardwick	Wakefield	53.65°N 01.30°W	SE4618
East Harling	Norfolk	52.43°N 00.92°E	TL9986
East Harlsey	North Yorkshire	54.38°N 01.35°W	SE4299
East Harptree	Bath and North East Somerset	51.29°N 02.63°W	ST5655
East Hartford	Northumberland	55.10°N 01.59°W	NZ2679
East Harting	West Sussex	50.96°N 00.87°W	SU7919
East Hatch	Wiltshire	51.05°N 02.11°W	ST9228
East Hatley	Cambridgeshire	52.13°N 00.13°W	TL2850
Easthaugh	Norfolk	52.71°N 01.07°E	TG0817
East Hauxwell	North Yorkshire	54.33°N 01.75°W	SE1693
East Haven	Angus	56.51°N 02.68°W	NO5836
Eastheath	Berkshire	51.39°N 00.85°W	SU8067
East Heckington	Lincolnshire	52.98°N 00.22°W	TF1944
East Hedleyhope	Durham	54.75°N 01.76°W	NZ1540
East Helmsdale	Highland	58.11°N 03.64°W	ND0315
East Hendred	Oxfordshire	51.58°N 01.35°W	SU4588
East Herringthorpe	Rotherham	53.43°N 01.32°W	SK4593
East Herrington	Sunderland	54.87°N 01.44°W	NZ3653
East Heslerton	North Yorkshire	54.17°N 00.59°W	SE9276
East Hewish	North Somerset	51.37°N 02.87°W	ST3964
East Hill	Kent	51.33°N 00.22°E	TQ5562
East Hoathly	East Sussex	50.92°N 00.16°E	TQ5216
East Holme	Dorset	50.67°N 02.15°W	SY8986
East Holton	Dorset	50.71°N 02.05°W	SY9691
East Holywell	North Tyneside	55.05°N 01.51°W	NZ3173
Easthope	Shropshire	52.55°N 02.65°W	SO5695
Easthopewood	Shropshire	52.56°N 02.65°W	SO5696
East Horndon	Essex	51.57°N 00.35°E	TQ6389
Easthorpe	Essex	51.85°N 00.77°E	TL9121
Easthorpe	Leicestershire	52.93°N 00.79°W	SK8138
Easthorpe	Nottinghamshire	53.07°N 00.95°W	SK7053
East Horrington	Somerset	51.21°N 02.60°W	ST5846
East Horsley	Surrey	51.26°N 00.43°W	TQ0953
East Horton	Northumberland	55.56°N 01.96°W	NU0230
Easthouses	Midlothian	55.87°N 03.05°W	NT3465
East Howe	Bournemouth	50.75°N 01.90°W	SZ0795
East Huntspill	Somerset	51.19°N 02.94°W	ST3444
East Hyde	Bedfordshire	51.84°N 00.37°W	TL1217

== East I ==
Location	Locality	Coordinates (links to map & photo sources)	OS grid reference
East Ilkerton	Devon	51.19°N 03.84°W	SS7146
East Ilsley	Berkshire	51.52°N 01.29°W	SU4981
Easting	Orkney Islands	59.38°N 02.40°W	HY7755
Eastington	Devon	50.86°N 03.79°W	SS7409
Eastington (Cotswold)	Gloucestershire	51.81°N 01.82°W	SP1213
Eastington (Stroud)	Gloucestershire	51.74°N 02.33°W	SO7705

== East K ==
Location	Locality	Coordinates (links to map & photo sources)	OS grid reference
East Keal	Lincolnshire	53.14°N 00.04°E	TF3763
East Kennett	Wiltshire	51.40°N 01.84°W	SU1167
East Keswick	Leeds	53.89°N 01.45°W	SE3644
East Kilbride	South Lanarkshire	55.76°N 04.18°W	NS6354
East Kilbride	Western Isles	57.10°N 07.33°W	NF7714
East Kimber	Devon	50.76°N 04.14°W	SX4998
East Kingston	West Sussex	50.80°N 00.46°W	TQ0802
East Kirkby	Lincolnshire	53.13°N 00.01°W	TF3362
East Knapton	North Yorkshire	54.16°N 00.65°W	SE8875
East Knighton	Dorset	50.66°N 02.27°W	SY8185
East Knowstone	Devon	50.99°N 03.66°W	SS8323
East Knoyle	Wiltshire	51.06°N 02.17°W	ST8830
East Kyo	Durham	54.86°N 01.73°W	NZ1752

== East L ==
Location	Locality	Coordinates (links to map & photo sources)	OS grid reference
East Lambrook	Somerset	50.95°N 02.81°W	ST4318
Eastland Gate	Hampshire	50.90°N 01.04°W	SU6712
East Langdon	Kent	51.16°N 01.33°E	TR3346
East Langton	Leicestershire	52.52°N 00.94°W	SP7292
East Langwell	Highland	58.02°N 04.16°W	NC7206
East Lavant	West Sussex	50.86°N 00.77°W	SU8608
East Lavington	West Sussex	50.93°N 00.66°W	SU9416
East Law	County Durham	54.88°N 01.86°W	NZ0954
East Layton	North Yorkshire	54.47°N 01.75°W	NZ1609
Eastleach Martin	Gloucestershire	51.74°N 01.71°W	SP2005
Eastleach Turville	Gloucestershire	51.74°N 01.72°W	SP1905
East Leake	Nottinghamshire	52.82°N 01.18°W	SK5526
East Learmouth	Northumberland	55.62°N 02.22°W	NT8637
Eastleigh	Devon	51.02°N 04.16°W	SS4827
East Leigh (Zeal Monachorum)	Devon	50.82°N 03.86°W	SS6905
East Leigh (Modbury)	Devon	50.35°N 03.85°W	SX6852
Eastleigh	Hampshire	50.96°N 01.36°W	SU4519
East Lexham	Norfolk	52.71°N 00.73°E	TF8516
East Lilburn	Northumberland	55.50°N 01.93°W	NU0423
Eastling	Kent	51.26°N 00.80°E	TQ9656
East Linton	East Lothian	55.98°N 02.65°W	NT5977
East Liss	Hampshire	51.03°N 00.88°W	SU7827
East Lockinge	Oxfordshire	51.58°N 01.39°W	SU4287
East Loftus	Redcar and Cleveland	54.55°N 00.88°W	NZ7218
East Looe	Cornwall	50.35°N 04.46°W	SX2553
East Lound	North Lincolnshire	53.48°N 00.82°W	SK7899
East Lulworth	Dorset	50.63°N 02.19°W	SY8682
East Lutton	North Yorkshire	54.10°N 00.56°W	SE9469
East Lydeard	Somerset	51.05°N 03.18°W	ST1729
East Lydford	Somerset	51.07°N 02.61°W	ST5731
East Lyng	Somerset	51.04°N 02.95°W	ST3328
