= William Roberts (engineer) =

Scottish civil engineer (1848–1918)

William Roberts J.P. M.Inst. C.E. (1848 – 30 November 1918) was Engineer-in-Chief to the Highland Railway based in Inverness, Scotland.

== Life ==
He was born in Dunblane in 1849, the son of William Roberts (1821–1896) for some time station master at Elgin, and for many years Superintendent of the line of the Highland Railway, and Margaret McGregor (1821–1877).

He married Madeline (c. 1854 – 19 May 1947) daughter of Donald Fraser on 30 April 1879 in Broomhall, Strathspey. They had the following children

- Donald Fraser Roberts (born 1881)
- William Roberts (born 1883) (also a railway engineer).
- Margaret MacGregor Roberts (died 1880)
- James Hamish Roberts (1885 – 13 October 1918)
- Simon Fraser Roberts (died 1891)
- Isabella Fraser Roberts (born 1887)
- Madeline Fraser Roberts (born 1889)
- Ewan Duncan MacPherson Roberts (1892–1935)
- John Fraser Roberts (born 1895)
- Cecil Herbert Roberts (born 1898)

He died at his home, Rockburn, 18 Southside Road, Inverness on 30 November 1918 and was buried in Tomnahurich Cemetery, Inverness where his memorial was erected.

== Career ==
He worked as a pupil and later assistant to Peter MacBey, Civil Engineer and Surveyor in Elgin from 1863 to 1871.

From 1871 to 1874 he worked under Murdoch Paterson, engineer in chief of the Highland railway and was the resident engineer for the Sutherland and Caithness Railway. In 1874 he was involved with the construction of the Eglinton Tunnel and Stobcross Dock, Glasgow. From 1876 to 1877 he worked for the Dunfirmline & Inverkeithing Railway. He also worked for the East India Railway on the Allahabad. From 1879 to 1891 he worked for the Badenoch and Strathspey districts of Inverness, where he designed and constructed stone, iron and timber bridges over the River Spey and the River Findhorn for the County Road Trustees. He also designed water and drainage works for Kingussie and Grantown-on-Spey.

He was appointed assistant to Murdoch Paterson in 1891 and succeeded him as engineer-in-chief to the Highland Railway in 1898 and designed several stations and other structures. He was responsible for the Inverness section of the Aviemore deviation line, the extension of the line from Stromeferry to Kyle of Lochalsh, the line from Wick to Lybster, the Dornoch Light Railway, and the doubling of the Highland Line between Struan and Blair Atholl.

He was appointed a Member of the Institute of Civil Engineers in 1897.

He retired from the Highland Railway in 1913 and during the First World War he was Food Commissioner for the North of Scotland Division.

== Works ==
- Locomotive Shed, Perth Railway Station 1893
- Newtonmore Railway Station 1893
- Kingussie Railway Station 1893–94 and waiting rooms on the up platform 1909–10
- Brora Railway Station 1893–95
- Agent and Workmen's Houses, Auldearn 1895
- Permanent Way Inspector's House, Forres 1895
- Aviemore Railway Station 1896–98
- Viaduct at Fort Augustus 1897–1903
- Pitlochry Railway Station 1897 (down platform waiting rooms)
- Kyle of Lochalsh Extension Railway 1897
- Inverness and Aviemore Direct Railway 1898
- Achnasheen Station Hotel 1898 (extensions)
- Fort George branch railway 1899
- Eight Workmen's Houses, Aviemore 1900
- Highland Main Line doubling 1901
- Dornoch Light Railway 1902
- Wick and Lybster Railway 1903
- Boat of Garten Railway Station 1904
- Laundry for the Station Hotel, Inverness 1904
- Six workmen's houses, Aviemore 1905
- Three workmen's cottages, Balsporan 1907
- Castle Bridge, Forres 1908 (consulting engineer)
- Two workmen's houses, Acheilidh Crossing Loop, Rogart Bank 1909
- Workmen's Houses, Dunkeld and Birnam Station 1912
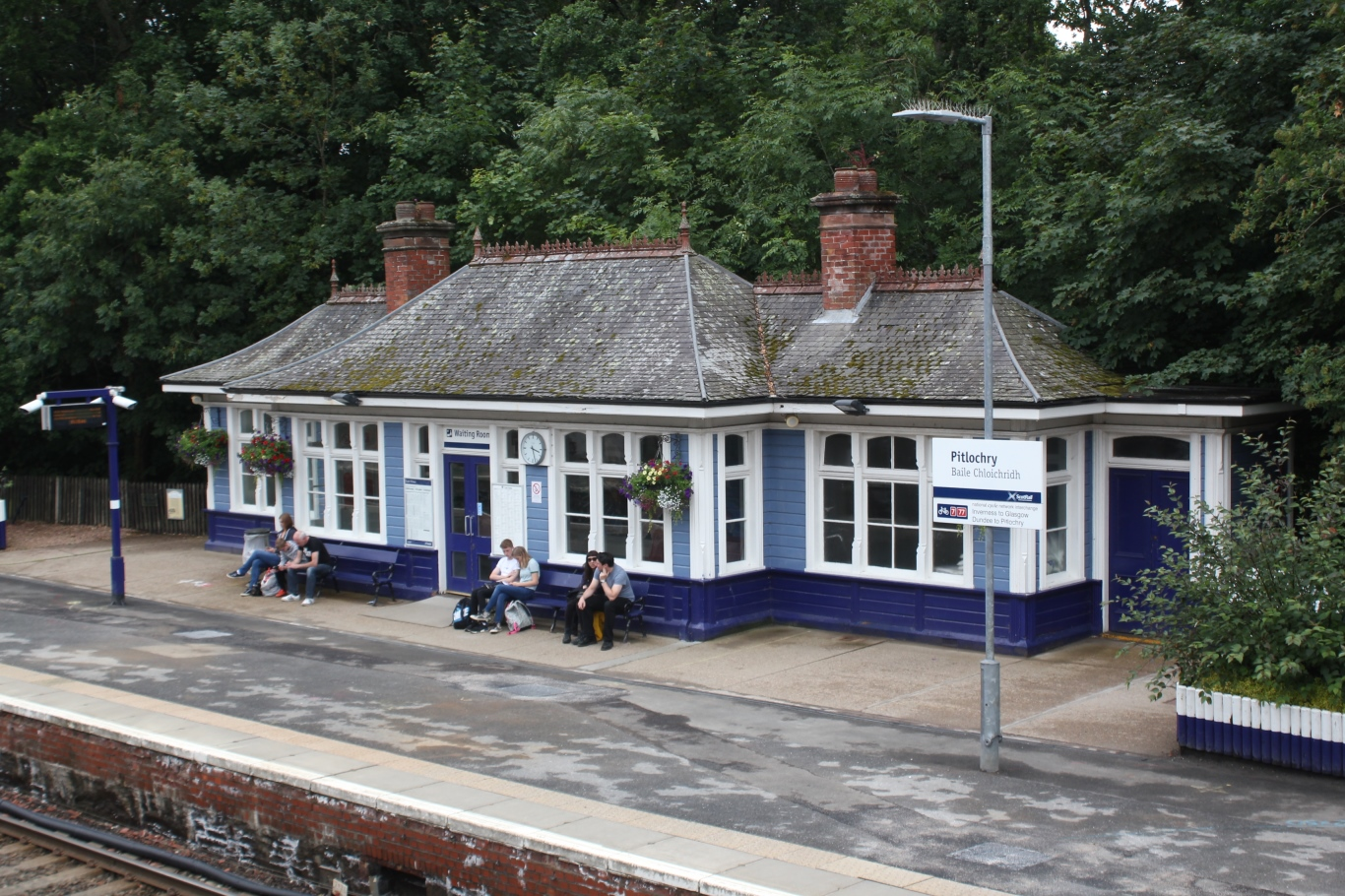
The down platform building at Pitlochry Railway station 1897

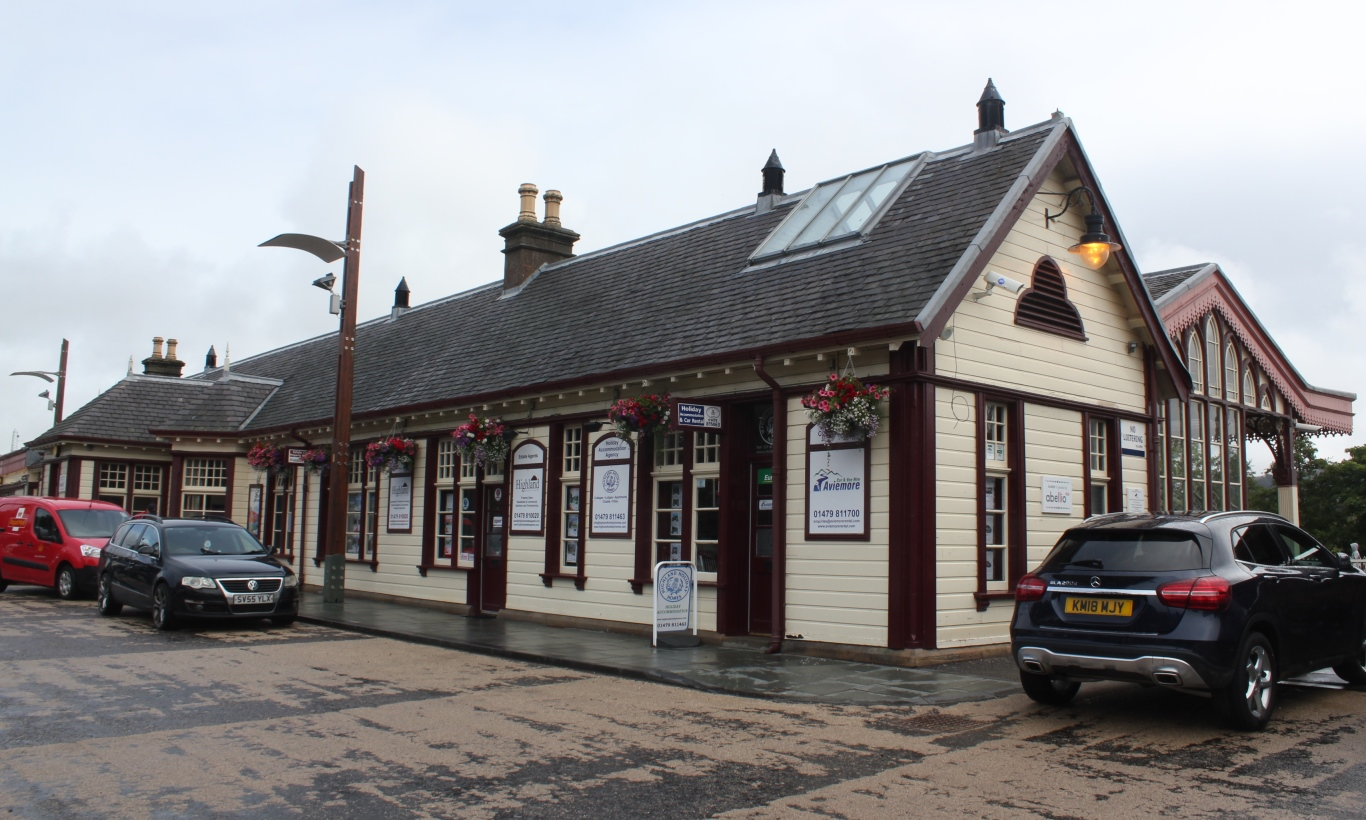
Aviemore Railway station 1896-98
