= West Langwell =

Coordinates: 58.051487°N 4.214557°W

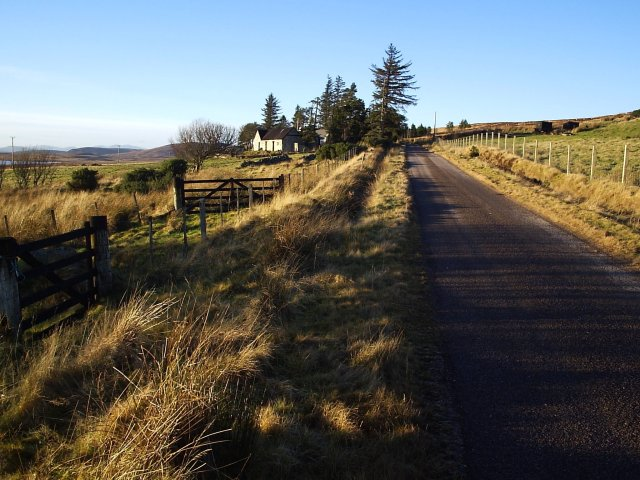

- Location within the Sutherland area
- OS grid reference: NC719095
- Council area: Highland
- Lieutenancy area: Sutherland
- Country: Scotland
- Sovereign state: United Kingdom
- Post town: Rogart
- Postcode district: IV28 3
- Police: Scotland
- Fire: Scottish
- Ambulance: Scottish

West Langwell is a small crofting settlement in Rogart, Sutherland is in the Scottish council area of Highland within the Scottish Highlands. The village of East Langwell lies 2 miles (3 km) directly southeast of West Langwell, and approximately 8 miles (13 km) north of Golspie.

== Gallery ==
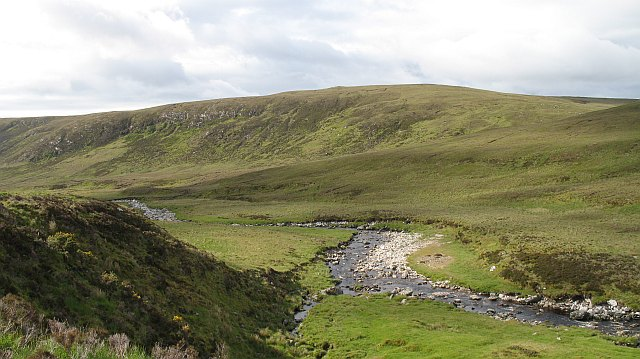
Abhainn Srath na Seilge View towards Creag Dhubh Dail nan Gillean across Srath na Seilge.

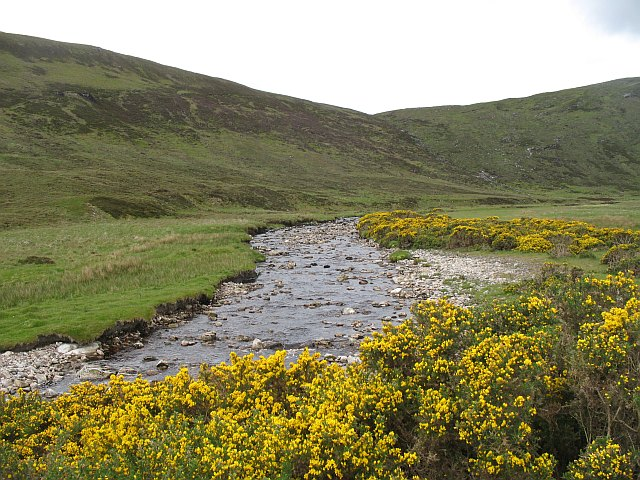
Abhainn Srath na Seilge or Black Water The river has now changed its name on the 1:25,000 map to Black Water. The river drains a large area of Ben Armine Forest and there is only one bridge upstream of here.

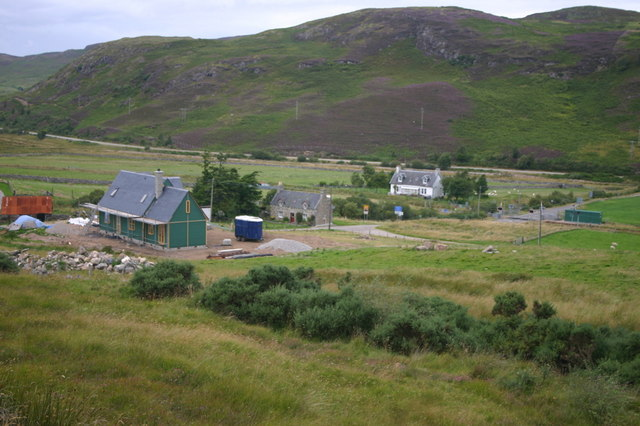
Acheilidh from above Looking down on the houses of Acheilidh and the level crossing

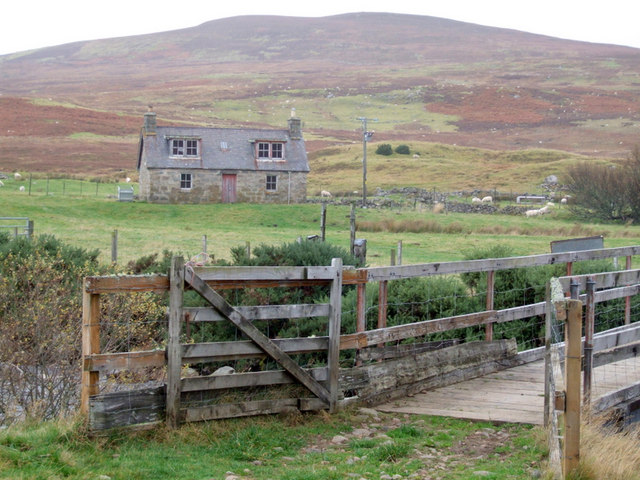
Braegrudie Only a footbridge leads to this remote croft

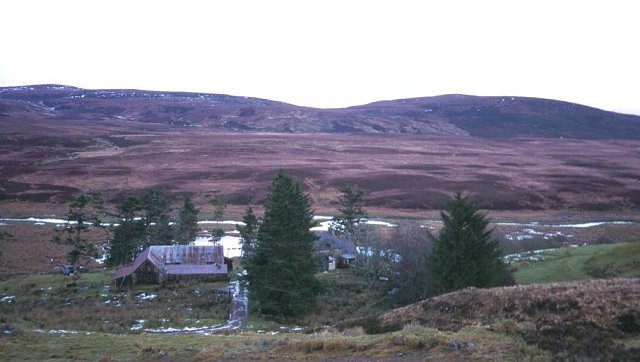
Craigton. Isolated, but still inhabited house in Strath Brora

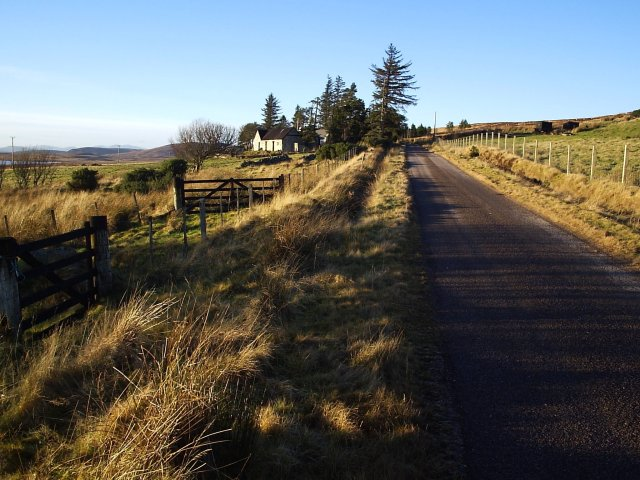
West Langwell. From the road.

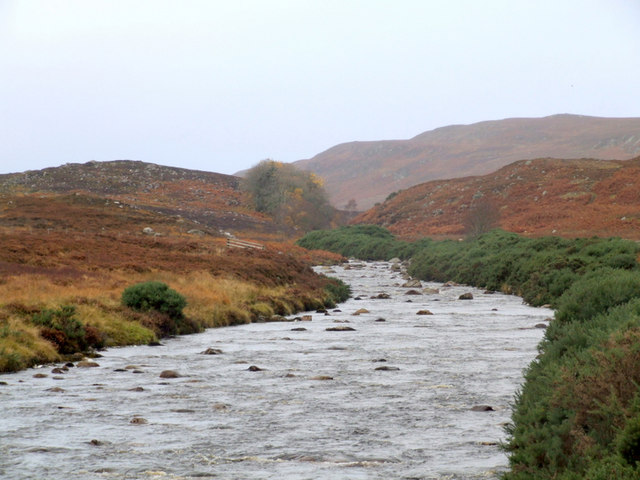
Looking up the Brora from Braegrudie

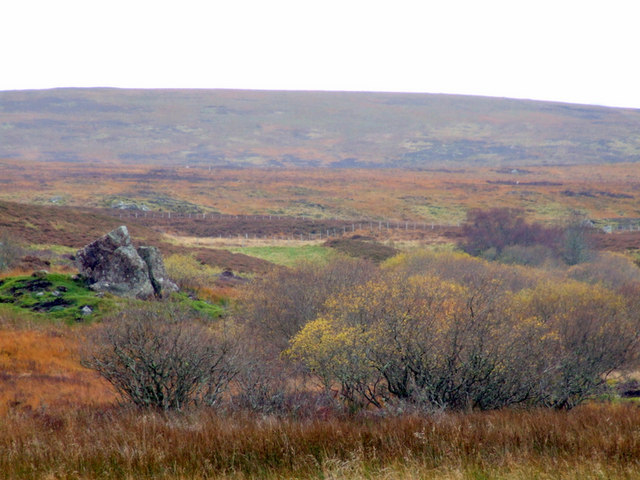
Split rocks at Braegrudie
