= Highland Railway W Class =

Highland Railway W class
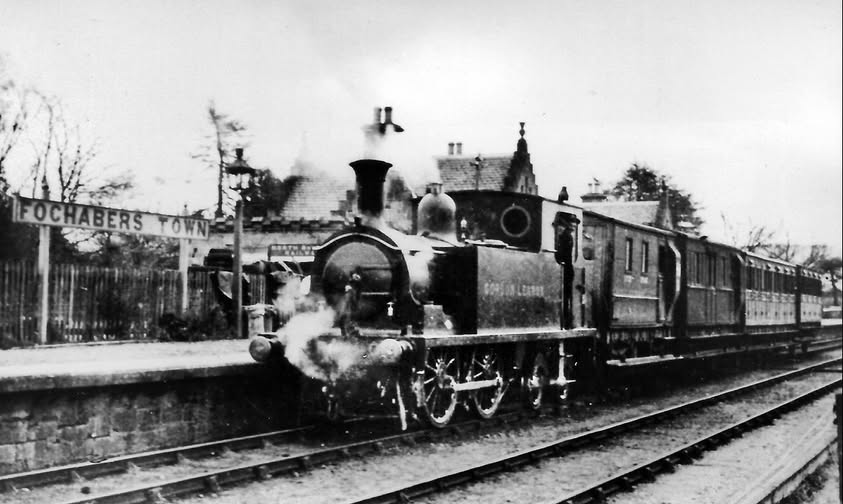
- Locomotive 40 Gordon Lennox
Type and origin
- Power type: Steam
- Designer: Peter Drummond
- Builder: HR Lochgorm Works
- Build date: 1905–1906
- Total produced: 4
Specifications
- Configuration
  - Whyte: 0-4-4T
  - UIC: B2′ n2t
- Gauge: 4 ft 8 1/2 in (1,435 mm) standard gauge
- Driver dia.: 4 ft 6 in (1.372 m)
- Trailing dia.: 2 ft 6 in (0.762 m)
- Loco weight: 35.75 long tons (36.32 t; 40.04 short tons)
- Fuel type: Coal
- Fuel capacity: 1.75 long tons (1.78 t; 1.96 short tons)
- Water cap.: 900 imp gal (4,100 L; 1,100 US gal)
- Firebox
  - Grate area: 13 sq ft (1.2 m^{2})
- Boiler: 3 ft 10 1/2 in (1.18 m) diameter
- Boiler pressure: 150 psi (1.03 MPa)
- Heating surface
  - Firebox: 68 sq ft (6.3 m^{2})
  - Total surface: 719.5 sq ft (66.84 m^{2})
- Cylinders: Two, inside
- Cylinder size: 14 in × 20 in (356 mm × 508 mm)
Performance figures
- Tractive effort: 9,256 lbf (41.17 kN)
Career
- Operators: HR → LMS → BR (Sc)
- Class: HR: W
- Power class: LMS: 0P
- Withdrawn: 1930–1957
- Disposition: All scrapped, prototype preserved

The Highland Railway W Class were four small 0-4-4T locomotives built by the Highland Railway in 1905–1906 to the design of locomotive superintendent Peter Drummond. They were the last engines that were built at the company's Lochgorm works in Inverness, and were used on branch line services.

== Predecessor ==
Dunrobin was an 0-4-4T built in 1895 by Sharp, Stewart & Co. for the 4th Duke of Sutherland. The W class were near-clones of Dunrobin.

== Numbers / Names ==
Table of locomotives
| HR No. | HR Name | Built | Withdrawn | LMS No. | BR | Notes |
|---|---|---|---|---|---|---|
| 25 | Strathpeffer | March 1905 | July 1956 | 15051 | 55051 | Name removed in 1920 |
| 40 | Gordon Lennox | September 1905 | December 1930 | 15052 | — | Name removed in 1920 |
| 45 | — | December 1905 | January 1957 | 15053 | 55053 | |
| 46 | — | February 1906 | October 1945 | 15054 | — | |

== Service ==
All four locomotives passed to the LMS in 1923, where they were numbered 15051–15054 and given power classification '0P'. Locomotive 15052 was withdrawn in 1930, and 15054 followed in 1945, but the other two survived to become British Railways 55051 and 55053. These spent their final years based at Helmsdale for working the Dornoch Light Railway, which required locomotives with exceptionally light axle loadings. By the time they were finally withdrawn (in 1956 and 1957 respectively) they were the last former Highland Railway locomotives still in use, and were still in almost original condition.

In order to replace these locomotives, British Railways transferred two GWR 1600 Class 0-6-0PT locomotives (numbers 1646 and 1649) to Helmsdale to work the Dornoch Light Railway.
