= East Field =

East Field may refer to:

- East Field Stadium, sports stadium in New York
- East Field (Saipan), World War II airfield in the Mariana Islands
- East Field Airport, now Brown Field Municipal Airport, San Diego, California
- Giza East Field, Egypt, containing pyramids and cemeteries
- Strother Army Airfield also called East Field, Kansas, United States

== See also ==
- Eastfield (disambiguation)
- Eastfields, an area of south London
