= East Langwell =

Coordinates: 58.02565°N 4.15515°W

- Location within the Sutherland area
- OS grid reference: NC728060
- Council area: Highland
- Lieutenancy area: Sutherland
- Country: Scotland
- Sovereign state: United Kingdom
- Post town: Rogart
- Postcode district: IV28 3
- Police: Scotland
- Fire: Scottish
- Ambulance: Scottish

East Langwell is a small, remote crofting settlement in Rogart, Sutherland, Scottish Highlands and is in the Scottish council area of Highland.

West Langwell lies 2 miles directly northwest of East Langwell, and approximately 6 miles north of Golspie.
