= Sutherland Railway =

UK railway company

Overview
- Locale: Scotland
- Dates of operation: 13 April 1868–28 July 1884
- Successor: Highland Railway

Technical
- Track gauge: 4 ft 8 1/2 in (1,435 mm)
- Length: 32 3/4 miles (52.7 km)

The Sutherland Railway was a railway company authorised in 1865 to build a line from Bonar Bridge station to Brora, a distance of nearly 33 miles, in the north of Scotland. This was to be continuation of a route from Inverness to Bonar Bridge that had been built by the Inverness and Ross-shire Railway; ultimately the line was extended to Thurso.

The Sutherland Railway opened its line as far as Golspie in 1868, but ran out of money at that stage, and never completed its line to Brora. That was later accomplished by the Duke of Sutherland's Railway.

The Sutherland Railway was absorbed into the Highland Railway, to which it was already indebted, in 1884. The line continues in use at the present day, as part of the Far North Line.

== First steps ==
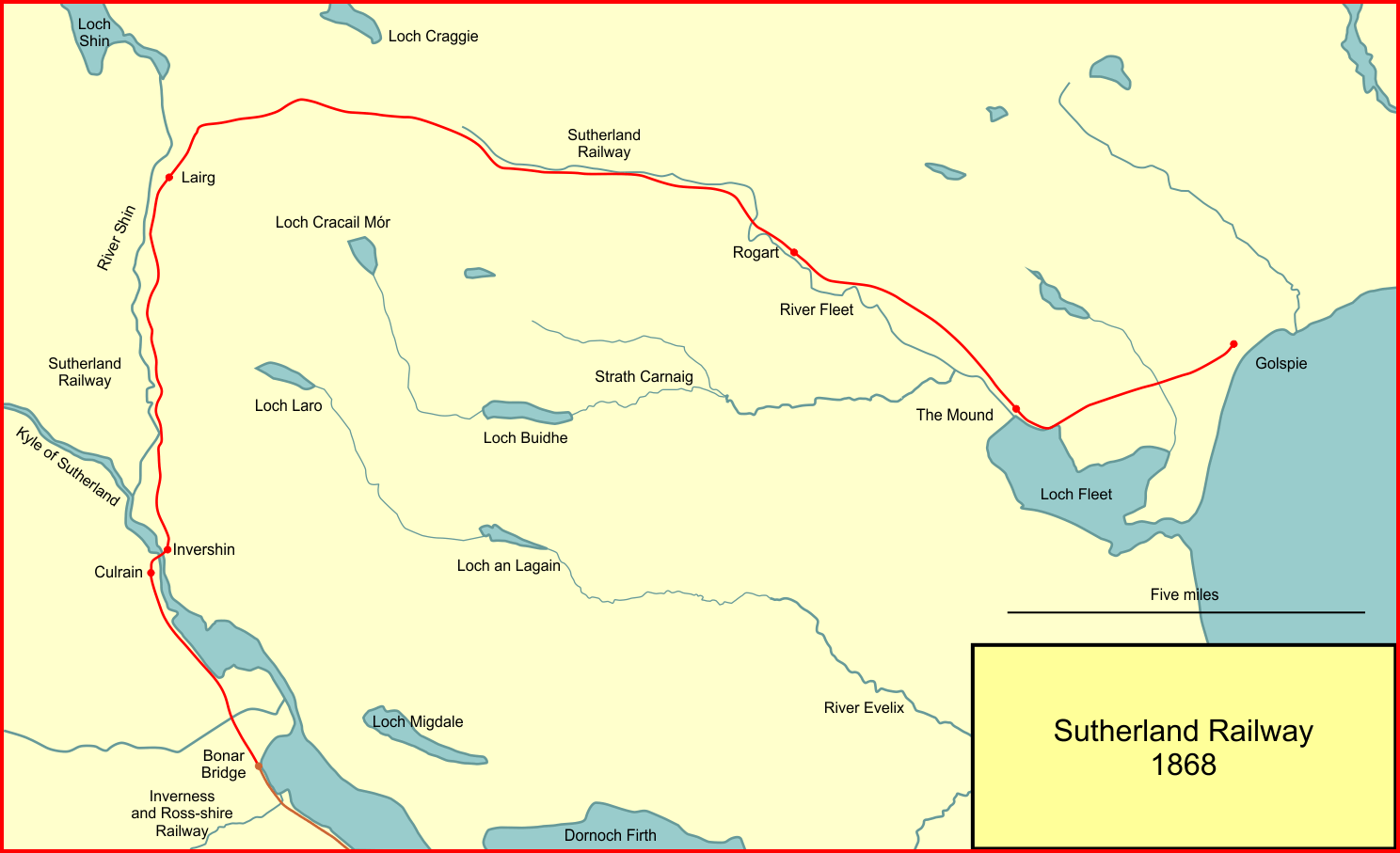
Map of the Sutherland Railway in 1868

In 1864 the Inverness and Ross-shire Railway had reached Bonar Bridge station from Inverness; in fact the station was in Ardgay on the west bank of the Kyle of Sutherland. It was only seen as a temporary terminus, and the next stage northwards was already being planned.

Sutherland Railway Act 1865
- Act of Parliament
- Parliament of the United Kingdom
- Long title: An Act for making a Railway from Bonar Bridge Railway Station at Ardgay in the County of Ross to Brora in the County of Sutherland, to be called "The Sutherland Railway;" and for other Purposes.
- Citation: 28 & 29 Vict. c. clxix

Dates
- Royal assent: 29 June 1865

Text of statute as originally enacted

The Sutherland Railway was projected to run from the Bonar Bridge station to Brora, nearly 33 miles, and it obtained its authorising act of Parliament, the Sutherland Railway Act 1865 (28 & 29 Vict. c. clxix) on 29 June 1865. Share capital was £240,000.

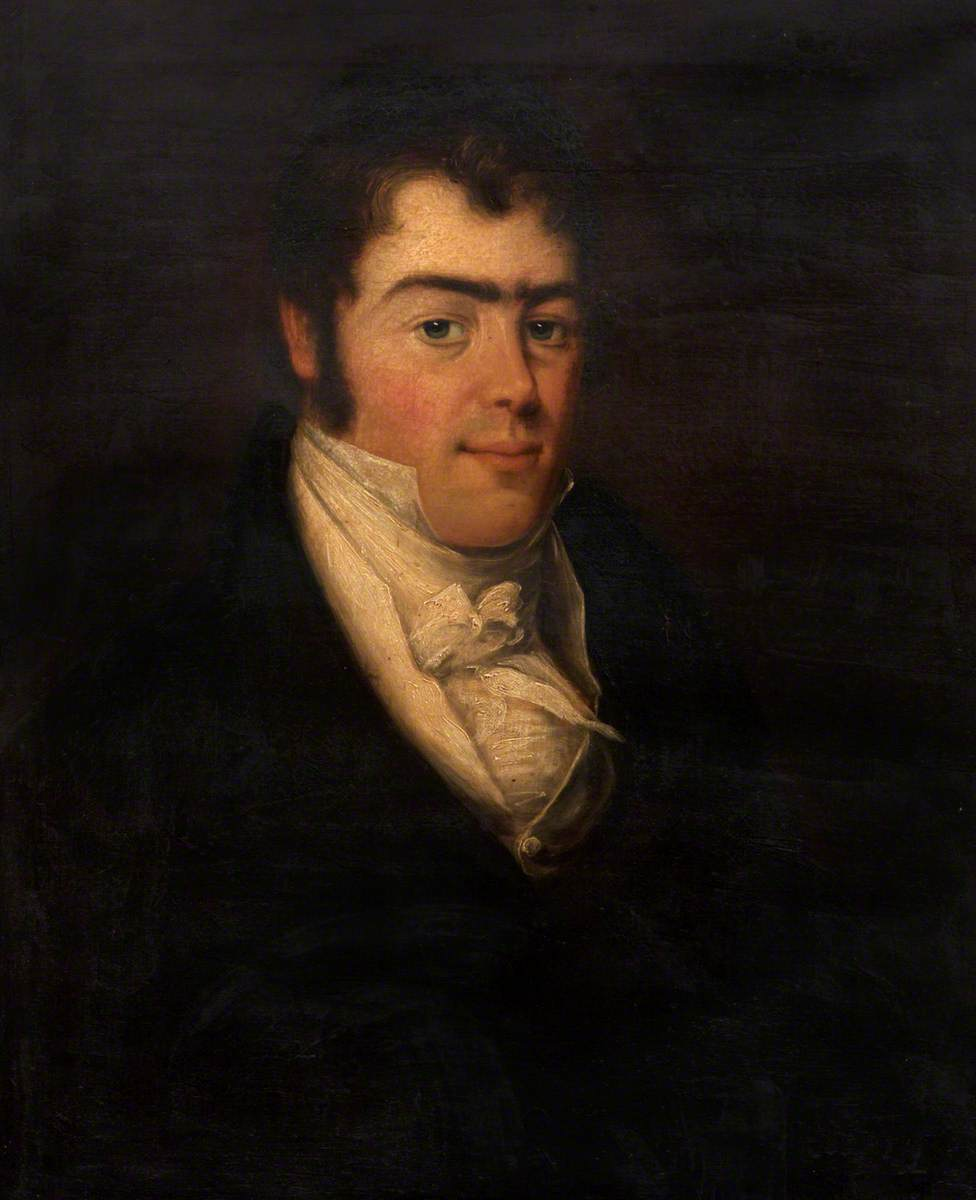
Joseph Mitchell

The engineer was Joseph Mitchell. Construction was started immediately; advertisements inviting tenders for construction had been placed in newspapers before royal assent was given.

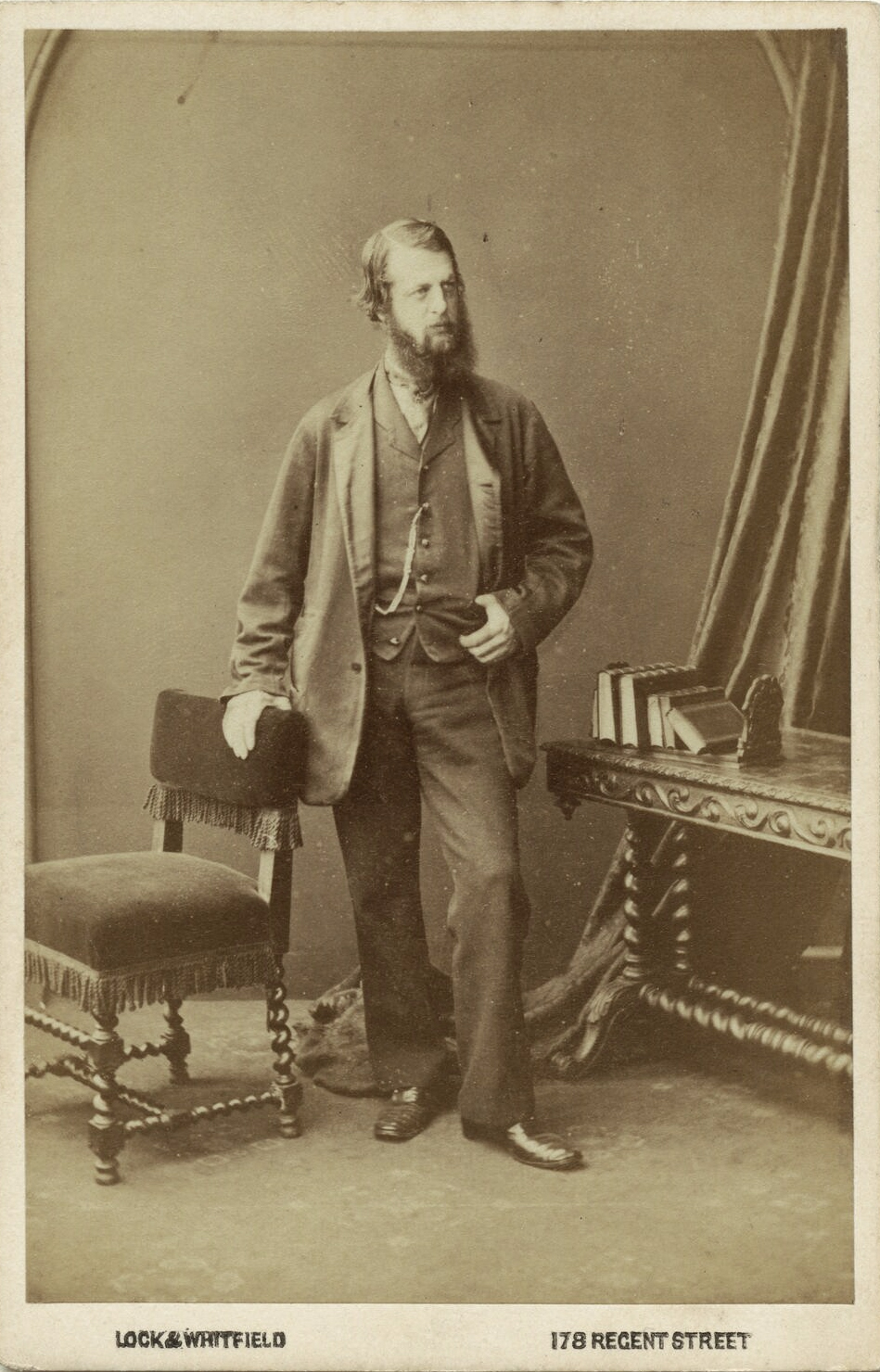
The Third Duke of Sutherland

George, the Duke of Sutherland was the main shareholder in the company, and the prime mover in bringing it to completion; he had a great interest in improving the situation of the inhabitants of his very extensive lands in Sutherland.

He was fascinated by mechanical things, and he was a keen railway enthusiast. Nevertheless economy in construction of the line was important to him, he was critical of Mitchell for his supposed over-specification of engineering works. In fact Mitchell was able to point out that contracts he had let for the work averaged £5,773 per mile, a very low figure, and there was an enduring friction between the two men. Notwithstanding Mitchell's economy, the funds for construction had been exhausted by the time the line had been built as far as Golspie in 1868, six miles short of Brora. This caused a permanent feeling of distrust of Mitchell by the duke.

== Financial affairs ==
In 1865-66 the Sutherland Railway's cash difficulties had become unmistakeable, and the duke let it be known that he thought the Highland Railway should inject £30,000 into the Sutherland Railway’s capital account. The Highland Railway was itself in a serious cash-flow crisis at the time, and the directors doubted that the necessary extraordinary shareholders' meeting would agree to the allocation of such a large sum, to what was suspected as being the personal plaything of the duke.

The Duke of Sutherland was himself a major shareholder in the Highland Railway, and a director of the company, and his continual pressure on the matter made things very difficult. At the Highland Railway board meeting of 9 October 1866, it was reported that the duke would take up £30,000 worth of the company's unissued 4½% preferred stock, enabling the Highland to invest £30,000 in the Sutherland Railway as allowed for in that railway's act of Parliament. Reluctantly the board agreed, and the forthcoming shareholders' half-yearly general meeting acquiesced. The arrangement was conditional on the Sutherland Railway Company continuing its line to Golspie at once, and completing it promptly to Brora. In fact it never got that far.

== Opening ==
The Sutherland Railway opened its line as far as Golspie on 13 April 1868, the line being worked as an extension of the Inverness and Ross-shire line; through trains between Inverness and the terminus at Golspie were provided by the Highland Railway. The Ross-shire company’s turntable and engine shed at Bonar Bridge were sold to the Sutherland Railway, and transferred to Golspie.

On opening day, the first train to Golspie was at midday from Bonar Bridge. It returned to Bonar Bridge at 6 p.m., but at 4.30 p.m. a special train arrived from Inverness, having left at 1.00 p.m. The duke got on at Rogart and took command on the footplate. At Golspie the banners, pipes and drums were waiting, and a procession went along the street, heading for the banquet that had been prepared.

From then on there were two trains daily each way between Golspie and Inverness, shown on the original poster as: Up Mail at 6 a.m. and Mixed at 3.15 p.m., arriving 9.50 a.m. and 7.20 p.m.; Down Passenger at 9.15 a.m. and Mail at 2.45 p.m., arriving at 1.20 p.m. and 7.20 p.m. Probably all these trains were mixed, passengers and goods; by the 1871 timetable they are all shown as such, with slightly altered times.

A service of coaches, running in connection with the trains, was established between Golspie and Wick and Thurso, and between the Mound (at the head of Loch Fleet) and Dornoch. For some years there was no station between Bonar Bridge and lnvershin, at the northern end of the bridge over the Kyle of Sutherland. The nearest road bridge was at Ardgay, and people living on the Ross-shire side of the Kyle had to come into Bonar Bridge to join the train, although the railway passed almost by their doors. A great improvement was effected in 1871, when a platform was opened at Culrain, at the south end of the viaduct.

For the time being, trains stopped by request at Culrain to pick up or set down passengers; but by 1873 it figured in the timetables as an ordinary station. Although little more than a quarter of a mile apart, Culrain and lnvershin served different districts, because of the lack of facilities for crossing the Kyle. Up to the end of 1916 a third-class single ticket between these stations cost one halfpenny, the lowest fare on the Highland Railway.

== Brora abandoned ==
The original Sutherland Railway Act 1865 gave authorisation to build as far as Brora, but the company had run out of money and was unable to complete. The Duke of Sutherland's Railway was later authorised to start at Golspie, and the act of Parliament for that line, the Duke of Sutherland's Railway Act 1870 (33 & 34 Vict. c. xxxi) of 20 June 1870, cancelled the Sutherland Railway's obligation.

== Acquired by the Highland Railway ==
The company was acquired by the Highland Railway, by the Highland Railway (Northern Lines Amalgamation) Act 1884 (47 & 48 Vict. c. clxxxiv) of 28 July 1884, taking effect on 1 September 1884.

== Dornoch Light Railway ==
The Dornoch Light Railway connected at The Mound; it started operation on 2 June 1902, and closed on 13 June 1960.

== Locations ==
- Bonar Bridge; Inverness and Ross-shire Railway station; opened 1 October 1864; renamed Ardgay 2 May 1977; still open;
- Culrain; opened 1 July 1870; still open;
- Invershin; opened 13 April 1868; still open;
- Lairg; opened 13 April 1868; still open;
- Rogart; opened 13 April 1868; closed 13 June 1960; reopened 6 March 1961; still open;
- The Mound; opened 13 April 1868; closed 13 June 1960; junction for Dornoch Light Railway, 1902 – 1980; trains to and from the station reversed at the junction;
- Golspie; opened 13 April 1868; still open.

The onward line was opened by the Duke of Sutherland's Railway in 1868.

== The line today ==
The line is still open, being part of the Far North Line.
