= The Mound railway station =

Railway station in Highland, Scotland

The Mound
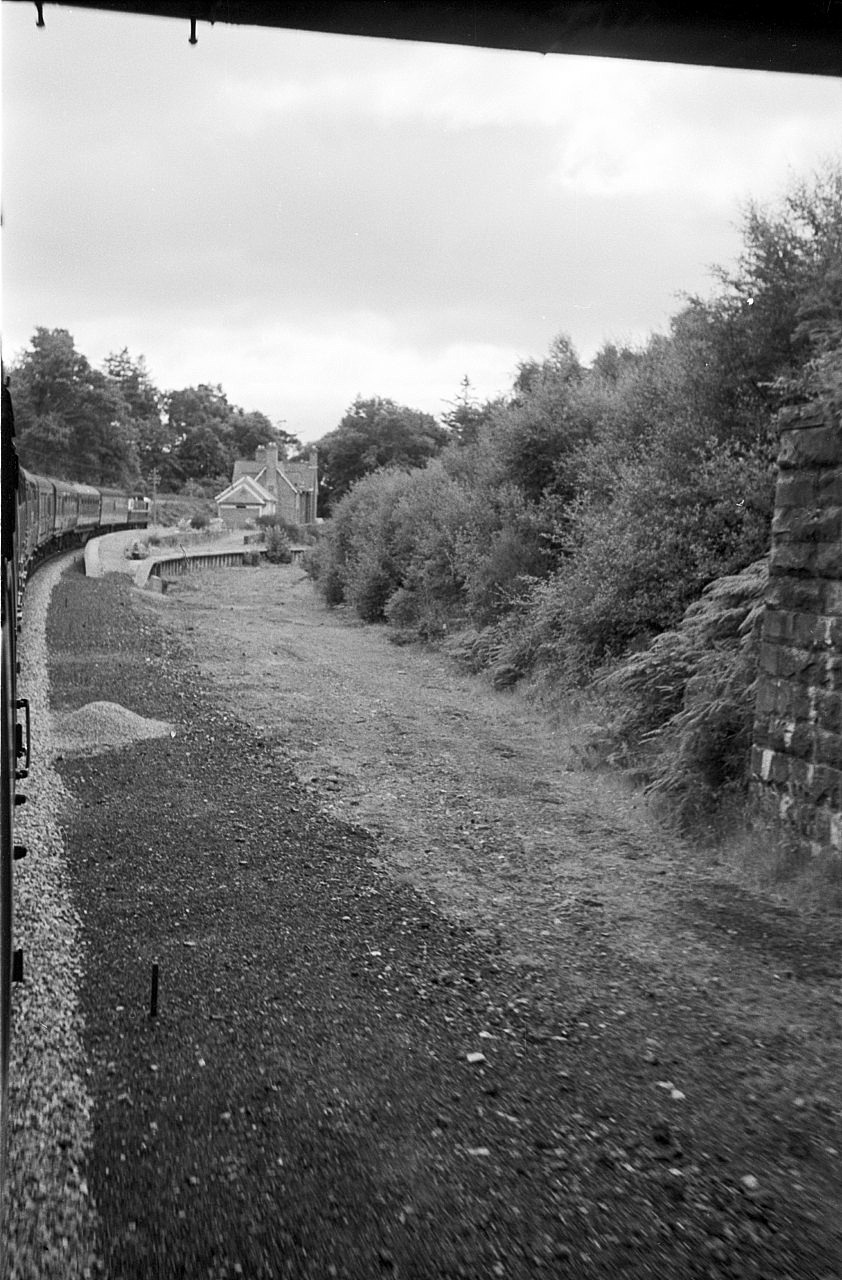

General information
- Location: The Mound, Highland; Scotland
- Coordinates: 57.9577°N 4.0712°W
- Grid reference: NH775983
- Platforms: 2

Other information
- Status: Disused

History
- Original company: Sutherland Railway
- Pre-grouping: Highland Railway
- Post-grouping: London, Midland and Scottish Railway; British Railways

Key dates
- 13 April 1868: Station opened
- 2 June 1902: Dornoch Light Railway opened
- 13 June 1960: Closed
Location

The Mound railway station is a former railway station on the Far North Line near the head of Loch Fleet in Scotland. For more than half of its life it was the junction for Dornoch.

== History ==
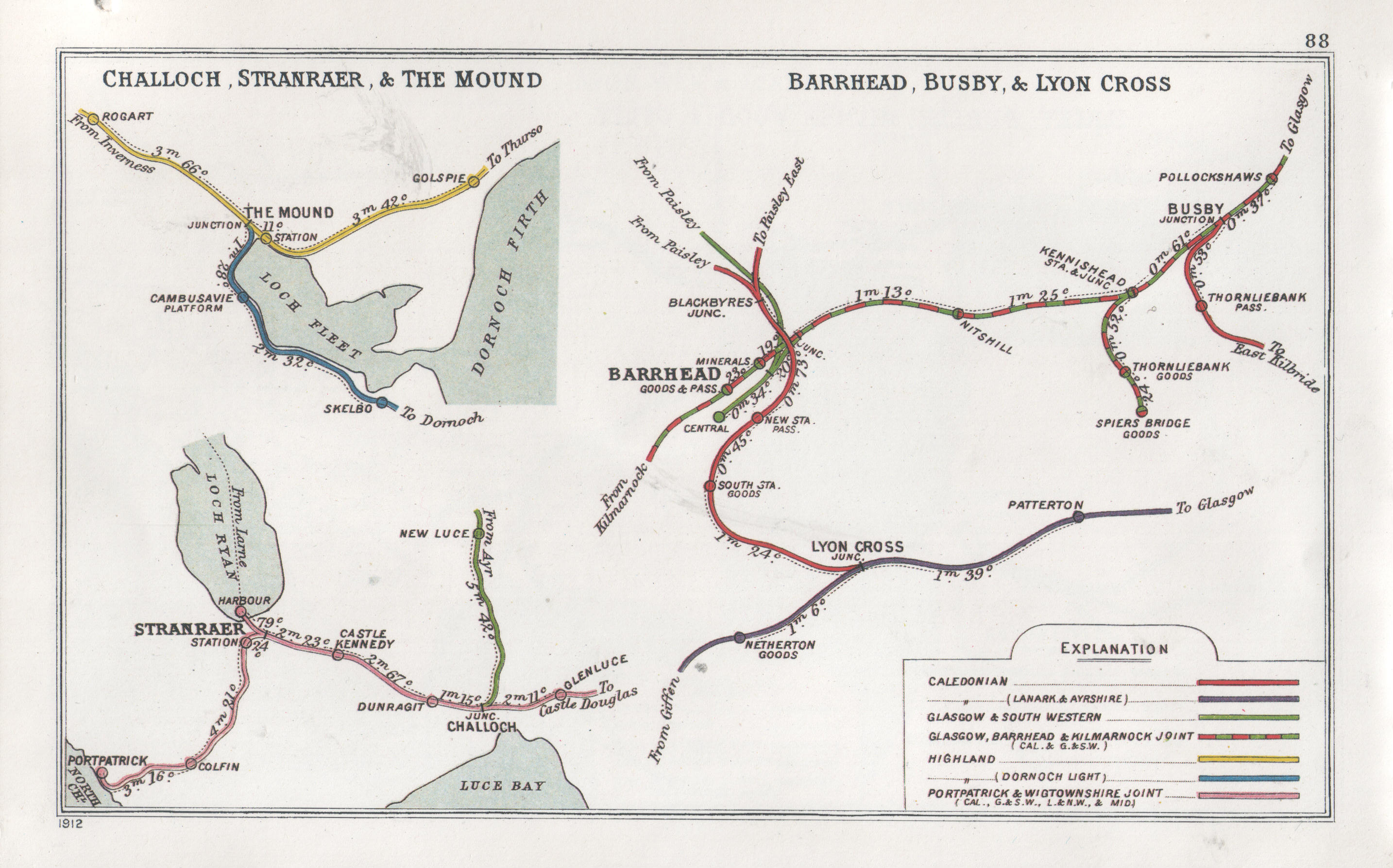
A 1912 Railway Clearing House map showing (upper left) railways in the vicinity of The Mound

The Sutherland Railway opened between Bonar Bridge and Golspie on 13 April 1868. Among the intermediate stations was one at The Mound, which opened with the line. It was 80 miles 70 chains (130.2 km) from Inverness, 3 miles 66 chains (6.2 km) from Rogart and 3 miles 42 chains (5.7 km) from Golspie. The station took its name from the nearby road embankment engineered in 1817 by Thomas Telford across the head of Loch Fleet, which is now on the route of the A9 road. In 1873–74 the station had one platform on the southern side of the line; on the northern side of the line there were two goods sidings.

In 1895, a tree blew down near to the station, and it fell on the rear of the sorting carriage of a mail train from Inverness to Wick. The sorter was unhurt as he was working in the front half of the carriage at the time.

On 2 June 1902, the Dornoch Light Railway was opened, which connected to the main line at a junction situated 11 chains (220 m) to the west of The Mound station. The platform for the Dornoch branch curved away from that of the main line. In 1906 the station had two platforms, one for each route; there was a passing loop on the main line, and the platform for the Dornoch branch had a run-round loop. Adjacent to the main line passing loop were two goods sidings, and there were three sidings to the west of the station, two of which were on the southern side of the line.

In 1922, there were six trains per day – in the up direction, departures were at 6:17 am, 11:30 am and 5:20 pm to Inverness; departures in the down direction were at 10:31 am and 1:55 pm to Wick and 6:38 pm to Helmsdale. Trains called at most intermediate stations, although some were request stops. There were no trains on Sundays.

The Dornoch branch closed on 13 June 1960, and The Mound station closed the same day. The line remains open, and the nearest station is now Golspie.

== Routes ==
Preceding station	Historical railways	Following station
Rogart; Line and station open	Highland Railway; Sutherland Railway	Golspie; Line and station open
	Disused railways	
Terminus	Dornoch Light Railway	Cambusavie Platform; Line and station closed
