= Rogart =

Coordinates: 58.00264°N 4.12408°W

Rogart: Scottish Gaelic: Sgìre Raoird
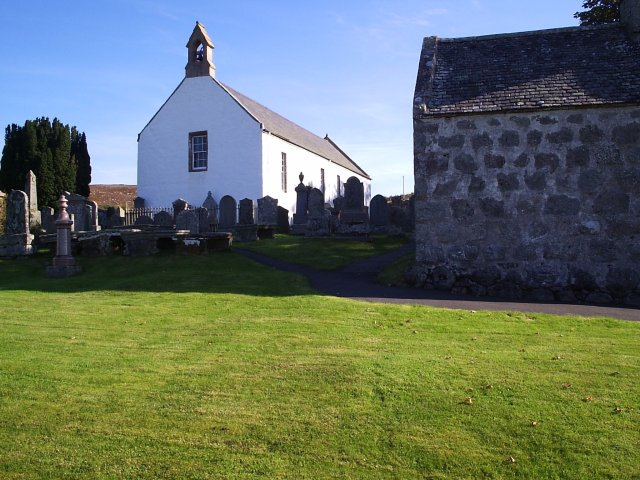
- St Callan's Church in Rogart

- Location within the Sutherland area
- OS grid reference: NC745034
- Council area: Highland
- Lieutenancy area: Sutherland
- Country: Scotland
- Sovereign state: United Kingdom
- Post town: Rogart
- Postcode district: IV28
- Dialling code: 01408
- Police: Scotland
- Fire: Scottish
- Ambulance: Scottish
- UK Parliament: Caithness, Sutherland and Easter Ross
- Scottish Parliament: Caithness, Sutherland and Ross

Rogart (/ˈroʊɡɑːrt/ ROH-gart, Scottish Gaelic: Sgìre Raoird or Raoghard, meaning "great enclosed field") is a parish in Sutherland, Highland, Scotland. The parish was the home of Major Andrew MacDonald, who fought in the French and Indian War.

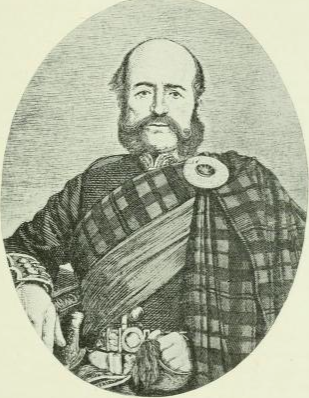
Andrew MacDonald (1721–1812)

It was originally a scattered crofting parish centred on the parish church of St Callan's, until the opening of the Rogart railway station at Pittentrail 1 1/2 miles (2.4 km) to the southeast. The locus of the parish shifted when a new 'industrial' village grew around Pittentrail following the arrival of the railway in 1886.

Pollen analysis suggests the planting of oak at Reidchalmai, Rogart, early in the first millennium AD, at a location where the species had not grown naturally for two thousand years. The mature trees appear to have been clear-felled in a single event towards the end of the sixth century.

The village of Golspie is 9 miles (14 km) east of Rogart whilst Lairg is 10 miles west.
