= Eastington, Devon =

Hamlet in Devon, England

Coordinates: 50.86686°N 3.78338°W

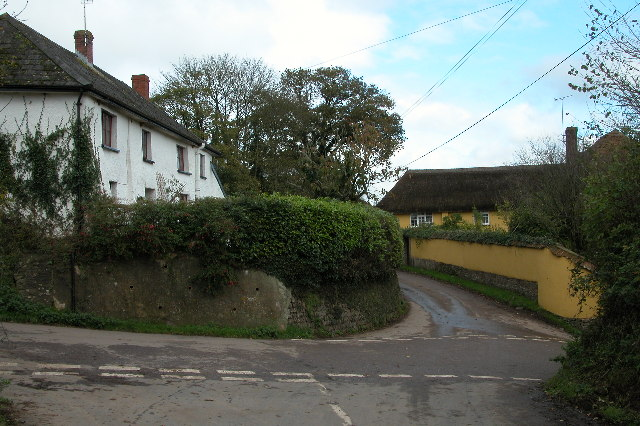
Eastington_Cross

Eastington is a hamlet in the English county of Devon.

Eastington is about one mile east of the village of Lapford.

The hamlet comprises a dairy farm and a racing stables as well as several private residences grouped around the crossroads of Eastington Hill and Cobley Lane at Eastington Cross.

It is connected to Barnstaple by the 325 bus service.
