= Dornoch Light Railway =

Defunct branch railway in Scotland

The Dornoch Light Railway was a branch railway in Scotland that ran from The Mound on the Far North Line to Dornoch, the county town of Sutherland.

It opened in 1902, having been heavily subsidised by the fourth Duke of Sutherland. It was worked by the Highland Railway.

Although it provided a useful link, the journey to Inverness was circuitous, and the development of road services for goods and passengers led to a steep decline, and it closed in 1960.

== Conception ==
The Sutherland Railway opened its line to Golspie in 1868, part of a route that eventually connected Inverness to Thurso and Wick, operated as the Far North Line. The Dornoch Firth presented a considerable natural barrier to the direct route of the line, although a crossing at Meikle Ferry would have been possible, putting Dornoch (population 2,861 in 1861) on the main line. However the Duke of Sutherland desired that the railway should come through Ardgay, and as he funded a considerable part of the cost of the line his wishes were complied with. The line made a wide westward sweep through Invershin and Lairg, and left Dornoch some considerable distance – 7 miles (11 km) – from the nearest station at The Mound. (Note: The name refers to the Thomas Telford road embankment.) Passengers made their way to the main line in an ancient mail coach.

The passing of the Light Railways Act 1896 encouraged many local communities to consider whether they could provide a railway connection for themselves. The act implied that less formal, low-cost operational and engineering arrangements would be possible, although this was never made specific.

The Dornoch Light Railway Company was formed in early 1897 to build a branch line. The fourth Duke of Sutherland was its chairman, and contributed £5,000, and gave much of the land free; he had a seat on the Highland Railway board. A prospectus was issued in November 1898, quoting the cost of the line at £30,000; individual subscriptions reached £9,501. Sutherland County Council offered to contribute £1,000; Dornoch Borough Council put in £500. The Treasury was asked for £9,000.

The Highland Railway (HR; successor to the Sutherland Railway) worked the line. This was not to be taken for granted. The HR wanted to be paid £1,000 for installing the junction at The Mound, although it relinquished the charge later. The Treasury grant was conditional on the Highland Railway guaranteeing to work the line for 99 years, which the HR declined to agree to, unless the directors of the Dornoch Light Railway gave personal guarantees, which they refused to do. The guarantee period was later reduced to 50 years. The Duke guaranteed the first 15 years and the HR softened its stance and agreed to guarantee the second 15 years. The HR was to be paid the actual cost of working the line.

== Construction ==
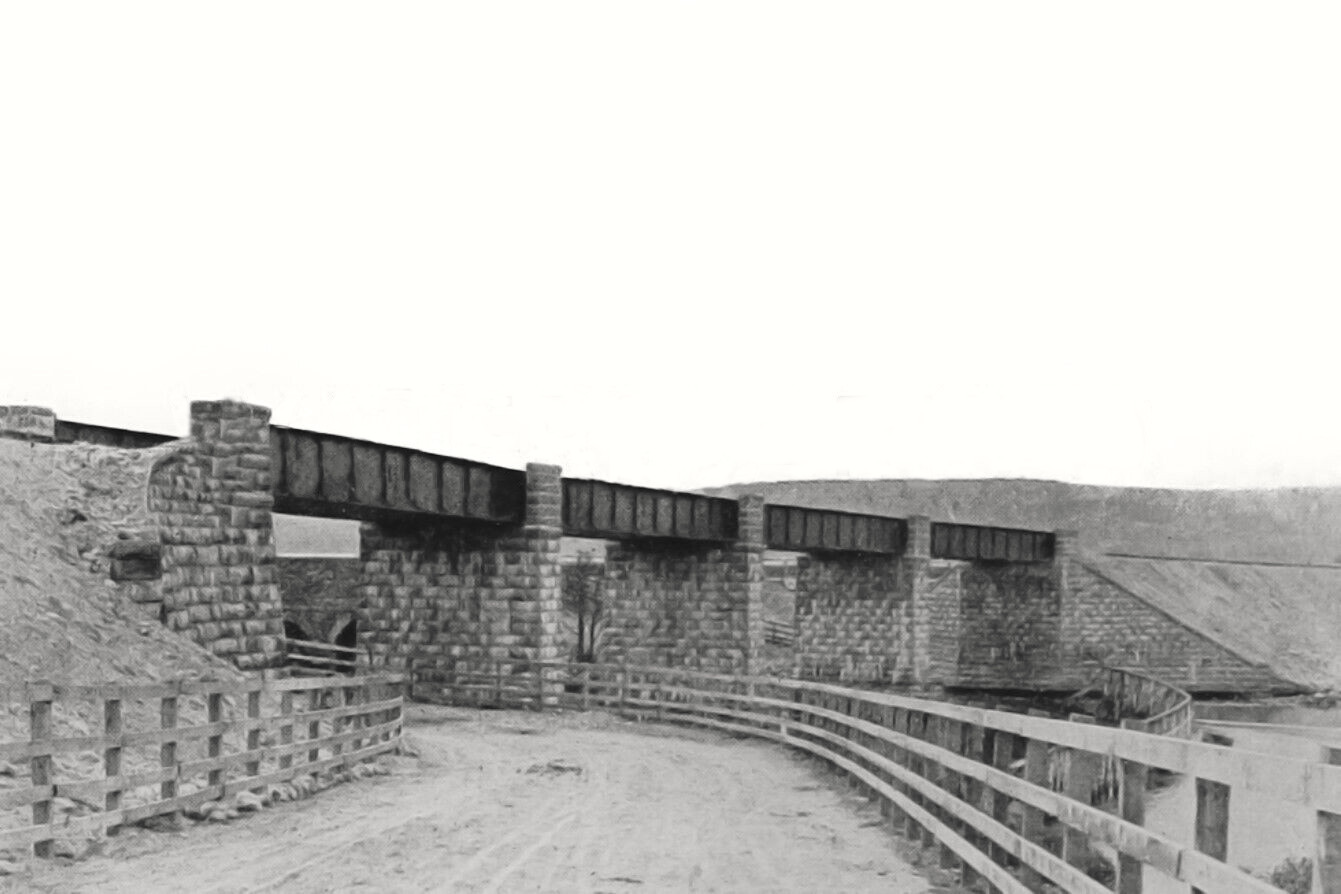
Dornoch Light Railway viaduct, 4 July 1910

Chisholm and Company of Dingwall contracted to build the line, for £11,573. The design was by the engineer-in-chief to the Highland Railway, William Roberts. The first sod of the railway was cut on Achinehanter farm, just north of Dornoch, on 15 May 1900 by Miss Florence Chaplin, acting on behalf of the Duchess of Sutherland who was unable to attend on account of the illness of the Marquis of Stafford.

In November 1900 Chisholm's company went bankrupt and work was suspended, and after some delay, a new contractor, Roderick Fraser, took over in July 1901. It ran north-west from Dornoch to the station at The Mound, and it opened on 2 June 1902. It was the first light railway in the Highlands, and it cost £28,000 (equivalent to £2,980,000 in 2025) to construct. There were stations at Cambusavie (actually having the status only of a "platform"), Skelbo, Embo and Dornoch. A dedicated platform was provided at The Mound for branch trains.

The line was inspected by Major E Druitt of the Board of Trade on 29 May 1902 and declared fit for public service.

=== Gradients ===
Leaving The Mound the line fell sharply at 1 in 45 for 1/4 mile (400 m), but after that the line was generally level with minor undulations as far as the third milepost. There followed a sharper sawtooth profile, with 1 in 45 once again for short lengths. Embo station was placed on a minor summit, and after a drop there was a second summit before a final steep descent to Dornoch station.

=== Dornoch Railway Hotel ===
On 17 October 1901 the Highland Railway announced its intention to build a large hotel in Dornoch, the first purely resort hotel built by the Highland Railway; it had 65 rooms and opened at the end of June 1904.

== Opening ==
There was an opening ceremony on 2 June 1902: a special train hauled by the Duke of Sutherland's private locomotive "Dunrobin", ran from the Mound conveying invited guests. After a formal opening ceremony at Dornoch led by Mr D Maclean, Deputy Chairman of the Highland Railway, there was a luncheon. Among the speakers was Andrew Carnegie, "the American steel king and multi-millionaire, who resided at Skibo [Castle], in the neighbourhood of Dornoch". In a speech warmly praising the attractions of Dornoch, he said he "had come there to try to arrange that Dornoch would be placed in the programme for a through saloon, and he was assured that it would come direct". (He meant a through carriage from Inverness.)

The Railway Magazine reported that:

A special six-wheel coupled, tank locomotive, "Dornoch". has been constructed at the Inverness Works of the Highland Railway from the designs of Mr. Peter Drummond for working the traffic on the line... Its chief dimensions are six-coupled wheels 3ft 8in. diameter, wheel base 12ft. (equally divided); total length over buffers 25ft. 3in., centre of boiler above rail level 5ft. 4½ in., top of chimney above rails 11ft. 6in.

An illustration in the Railway Magazine article shows it to have been no. 56; in fact this was Lochgorm Tank 0-6-0T no. 56, which had been built in 1869 and rebuilt in 1896. It was specially renamed Dornoch for the branch, having previously been named Balnain. It was used on the branch until at least Summer 1919.

Dornoch had a wooden engine shed, and the line was operated on the one engine in steam principle. The passenger train service at the beginning was three trains each way with an additional return journey on Tuesdays; Cambusnavie Platform was a request stop; the first train from Dornoch was at 6:10 am, no doubt to connect onwards to Inverness. The journey time on the branch was between 20 and 27 minutes; there was no Sunday service.

A through carriage from Inverness was conveyed on the 12:58 pm train in 1905, and a through Pullman sleeper was run from Glasgow to Dornoch every Friday night in June. However, with the opening of the hotel in 1906 the HR laid on a dedicated train, the "Further North Express", which ran from Inverness to Dornoch on Fridays only during the months of July to September, non-stop from Inverness to the Mound. After October 1906 and the Further North Express became a Wick train, and Dornoch passengers had to change at the Mound unless an entire carriage had been reserved from Inverness.

In 1922 the train service was simply three return journeys daily; the first train left Dornoch at 10:55 am and the last arrived there at 7:15 pm; the foreshortened working day was no doubt a result of the working hours limitation that had been introduced.

The route was 88 miles (142 km) compared with a straight line distance of 29 miles (47 km).

== Locomotives ==
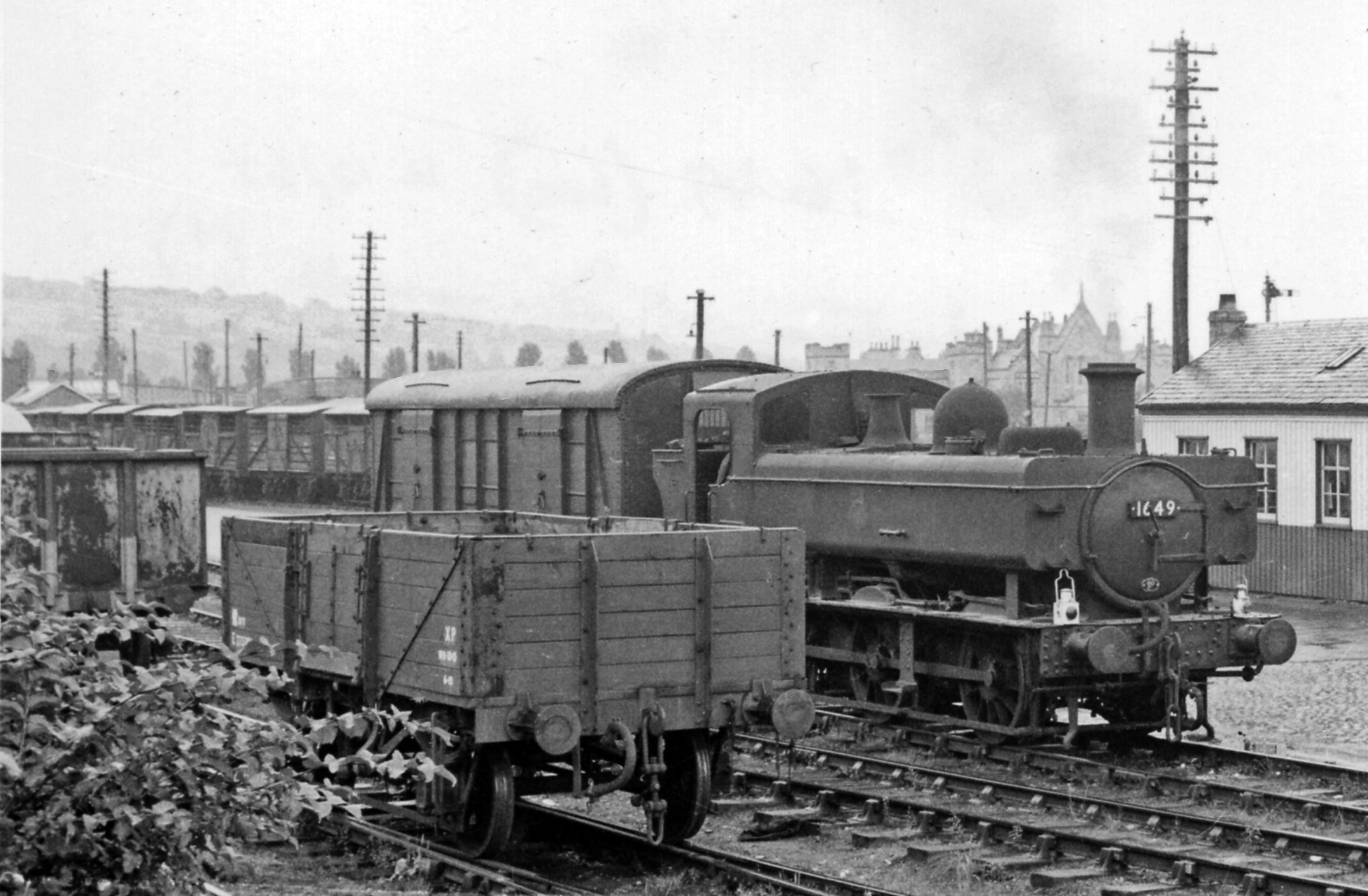
1649 2 year after the closure of the line

Locomotives used on the Dornoch branch needed to have a light axle loading, and they operated both passenger trains and pick-up freight. They were based at Helmsdale, where the running maintenance was carried out; there was a small shed at Dornoch for overnight stabling.

After nationalisation two Highland Railway 0-4-4 Highland Railway W Class tank locomotives were retained for service on the branch: no. 55051 and 55053, formerly no. 25 and 45. 55051 was withdrawn in the summer of 1956, but 55053 was overhauled and continued in service. However early in 1957 its leading axle broke while it was hauling a mixed train on the branch. No-one was injured but this was the end of 55053, and an 0-6-0 pannier tank locomotive, no. 1646, was drafted in from the Western Region to take over. A second engine of the 1600 Class, no. 1649, was sent to Helmsdale in July 1958. A British Railways 2MT Mogul no. 78052 saw occasional work on the line between February 1957 and September 1958.

== Finances ==
The DLR made a modest profit until 1921, when earnings of £4,868 were overtaken by costs of £5,612. It was then necessary to draw on the company's reserves of £800, and it was obvious that the situation would further deteriorate. (The Highland Railway was working the line, so the Dornoch Light Railway company was simply a financial shell.) In that year the Railways Act 1921 was passed, signalling that the railways of Great Britain were to be "grouped", and this took effect in 1923. The Highland Railway was a constituent of the new London Midland and Scottish Railway (LMS), and the LMS absorbed the Dornoch company. The LMS paid £75 for every £100 of Dornoch £100 debenture stock, totalling £1,652, and £15 per £100 of ordinary stock (£13,072).

== Closure ==
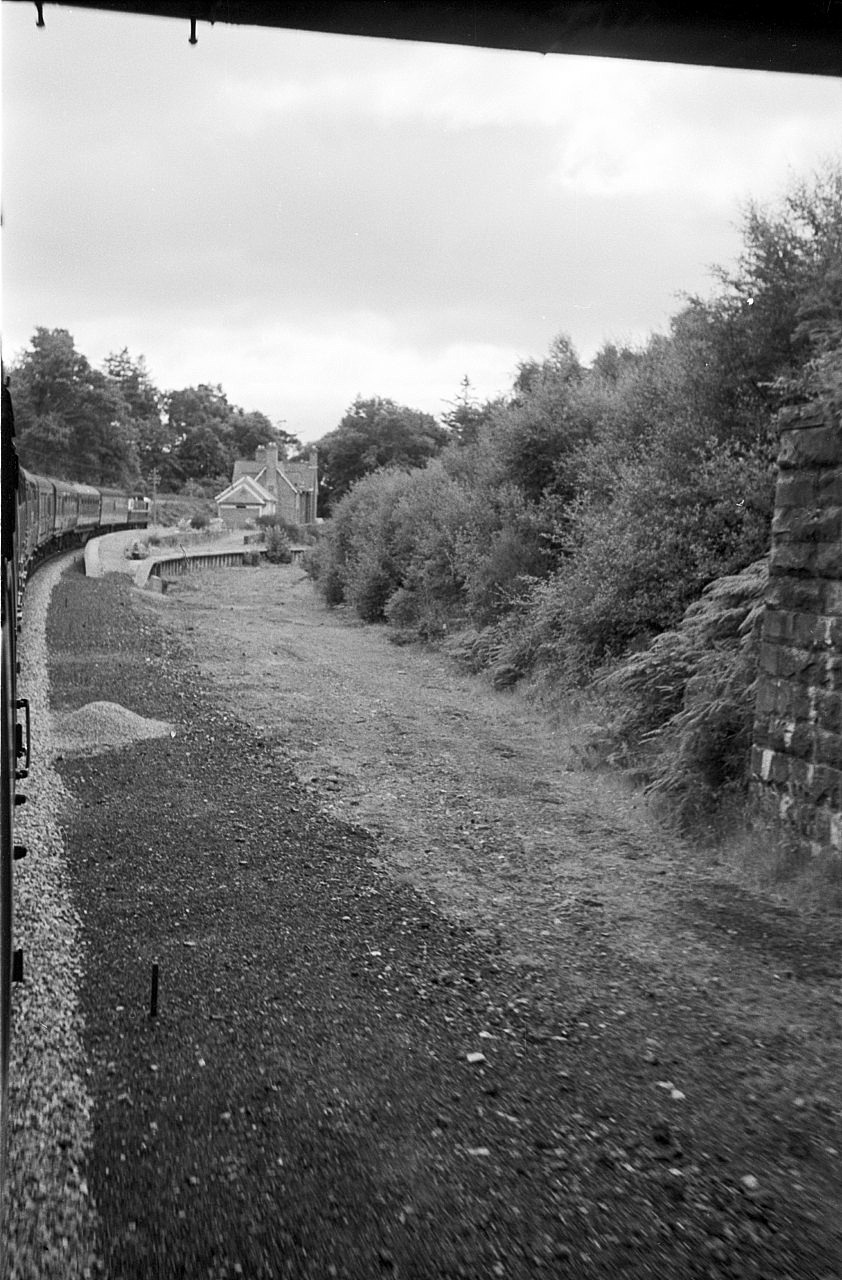
The Mound station in 1965 with the branch line track removed.

In common with many branch lines serving areas with a low population density, the traffic on the line was hit hard by the advent of reliable road services, both for goods and passengers, and use of the line declined steeply. The line was first proposed for closure by in 1949 but following protests by Dornoch Town Council the Railway Executive relented and line was saved.

It was eventually closed on 13 June 1960, having retained "a meagre passenger service, despite its geographical handicap". The line was then left and by 1962 & the track on the DLR had been lifted.

== See also ==
- History of the Far North of Scotland Railway Line
