= Iye Roy Mackay, 10th of Strathnaver =

Scottish clan chief

Iye Roy Mackay, 10th of Strathnaver (died 1517), was the tenth chief of the ancient Clan Mackay, a Scottish clan of the Scottish Highlands.

== Early life ==
Iye Roy Mackay, 10th of Strathnaver, was the eldest son of Angus Roy Mackay, 9th of Strathnaver, and his wife who was a daughter of Mackenzie of Kintail, chief of Clan Mackenzie.

== Feud with the Rosses ==
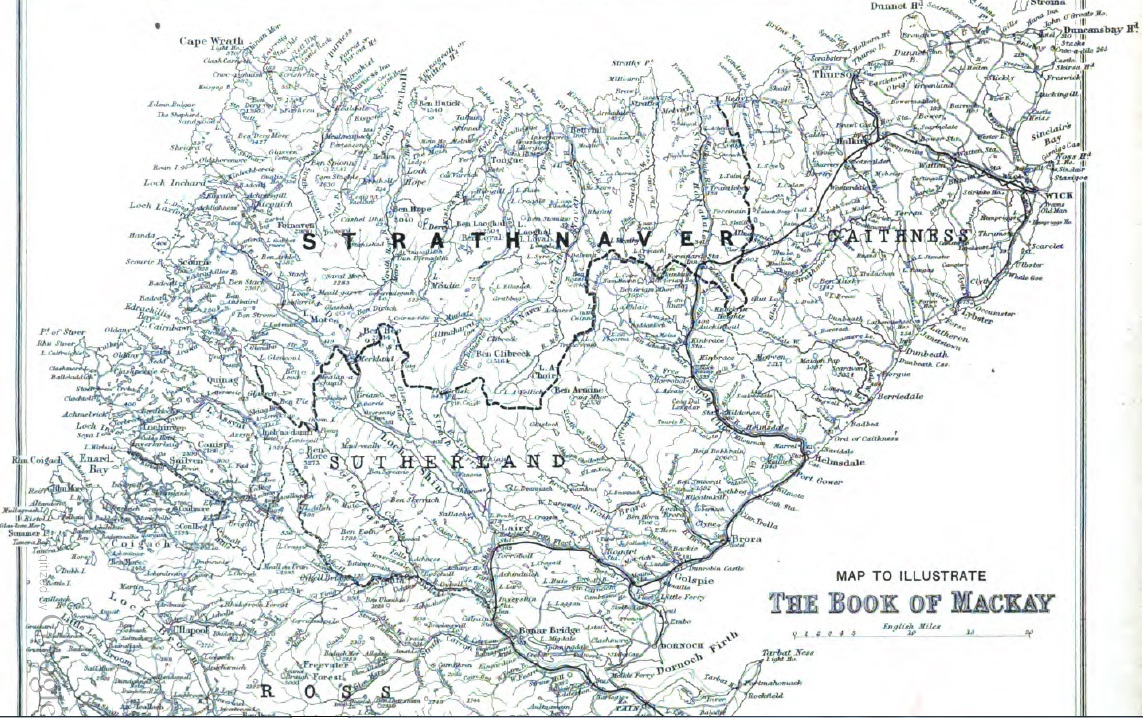
Map showing the Mackay chief's territory of Strathnaver in relation to Caithness, Sutherland and Ross to the south

Iye Roy Mackay's father, Angus Roy Mackay, had been killed in 1486 at the Battle of Tarbat in a feud over lands with the Clan Ross. Soon after this the Mackays, under John Rivach Mackay (second son of Angus Roy Mackay) and William Mackay who was the chieftain of the Mackay of Aberach branch of the clan, invaded Ross and defeated the Clan Ross at the Battle of Aldy Charrish in 1487 where Alexander Ross of Balnagown, chief of the Rosses was killed, along with seventeen other landed gentlemen of the province of Ross. Historian Angus Mackay however disputes the account given by Sir Robert Gordon, 1st Baronet, who himself was a son of Alexander Gordon, 12th Earl of Sutherland, and who says that at this battle the Mackays were supported by a force provided by the Earl of Sutherland. Mackay states that the feudal superiority of the Earls of Sutherland over the Mackays, as claimed by Sir Robert Gordon, "nowhere existed save in his own fertile imagination". Angus Mackay says that it is also unlikely that the Earl of Sutherland who was married to a daughter of Ross of Balnagown would have assisted against his own father-in-law. Thirdly, Angus Mackay says that the Earls of Sutherland are not mentioned in a remission from the king to John Rivach Mackay in 1494, and so it seems that Sir Robert Gordon had tried to snatch the victory of the Mackays over the Rosses at Aldy Charrish, but that the facts are against him. In 1490 James IV of Scotland granted to David Ross, nephew and heir of John Ross, and grandson of John Ross of Balnagown, the lands of Strathoikel and Strathcarron, which had formerly belonged to Morgan Neilson Mackay. (Note: Morgan Neilson Mackay and his brother Neil Neilson Mackay had attempted to take over the lands of Strathnaver from their cousin, Angus Du Mackay, 7th of Strathnaver, but they were defeated and killed at the Battle of Drumnacoub in 1433 by Angus's forces.) Likewise, on 15 March 1504, Iye Roy Mackay 10th of Strathnaver secured from the king the lands of Ferencostrig, Strathhalladale, Creichmore, Assent, Coigach, Gruids and Strathfleet. On 15 February 1506, Iye Roy Mackay caused the charter granted by Donald of Islay, Lord of the Isles, and by which the Mackays laid claim to these lands, to be recorded. However, the Lords of Council decided that the lands had belonged to Euphemia II, Countess of Ross. Although John Rivach Mackay received a remission from the king in 1494, the blood feud with the Rosses appears to have continued as David Ross of Balnagown and Iye Roy Mackay of Strathnaver were summoned to appear before the Earl of Argyll who was the Lord High Chancellor of Scotland. On 4 October 1496, each of them were bound by extending their hand to Argyll in the king’s name to keep the peace towards each other and that their "folks sal be harmless and skaithles", under the penalty of 500 merks if they failed. Notwithstanding the apparent reconciliation, David Ross of Balnagown and his brother Hucheon Ross, brought an action to the Lords of Council against the Mackays for spoils taken from their lands eight years earlier.

== Apprehension of Sutherland of Dirlot ==
Sutherland of Dirlot who was Iye Roy Mackay’s nephew and who was pursued for some debts by Sir James Dunbar of Cumnock, murdered his relative, Alexander Dunbar, who in turn was the step-father of John, Earl of Sutherland. In consequence Sutherland of Dirlot was "put to the horn". Iye Roy Mackay was already bound to the king's service for maintenance and order and received a commission to apprehend Sutherland of Dirlot, and did so. Mackay was rewarded by a charter under the Great Seal of Scotland dated 4 November 1499, for the lands of Dirlot, Farr, Armadale, Strathy, Rennvie, Davach, Lochnaver, Davach Eriboll, all in Strathnaver, and also Kinald, Golspie, and Kilcolumkill in Sutherland, and also Dirlot, Cattack, Bronach, two pennylands of Stroma, all in Caithness. Historian Angus Mackay says that Sutherland of Dirlot being a nephew of Iye Roy Mackay, his apprehension does seem heartless, but justifies it by the fact that Sutherland of Dirlot had by some means been able to get hold of lands in Strathnaver that had previously belonged to the Mackay family.

== Rebellion of Donald Dubh ==
Towards the end of the 15th century and at the beginning of the 16th century, the king of Scotland who was irritated at the misconduct of the Hebrideans, cancelled many charters of the leading families which caused them to revolt. Around the same time Donald Dubh, grandson of John of Islay, Earl of Ross and Lord of the Isles, escaped from imprisonment on Innis Chonnell. Donald Dubh put himself at the head of the discontented confederates and it took three expeditions in 1503, 1505, and 1506 to quell the tumult. Historian Angus Mackay states that Iye Roy Mackay of Strathnaver, in all of these expeditions, did most effective work at the head of his clan. This included capturing Torquil, chief of the Clan MacLeod of Lewis, who the Parliament of 1505 had found guilty of treason. The Earl of Huntly, Mackay and others battered Stornoway Castle with artillery, after which MacLeod was taken prisoner. The king rewarded "Y Mackay" with extensive lands for helping to crush the Hebrideans in a charter dated 15 March 1504. However, it is Clan Cameron tradition that they defeated a joint force of Mackays and Munros at the Battle of Achnashellach in 1505, the Cameron chief having supported the rebellion of Donald Dubh.

== Battle of Flodden ==
According to the Blackcastle MS (which was written by Alexander Mackay of Blackcastle who had access to the Mackay chief’s family charters and papers) when James IV of Scotland resolved to invade England, Iye Roy Mackay of Strahtnaver accompanied by his brother John Rivach Mackay, at the head of a contingent from Strathnaver, fought at the Battle of Flodden in 1513. Iye Roy Mackay escaped with his life, but his brother John was killed along with a number of clansmen.

== Relations with the Earl of Sutherland ==
Shortly before his death, Iye Roy Mackay joined a band of friendship with Adam Gordon, Earl of Sutherland dated 31 July 1517. Historian Angus Mackay disputes the account given by Sir Robert Gordon, who himself was a son of Alexander Gordon, 12th Earl of Sutherland, and who Mackay says makes it appear that Mackay was acting as a vassal to his superior. Likewise, historian Sir William Fraser states that Sir Robert Gordon describes it as if it was granted by an inferior to a superior which is not the case, and that the agreement, except for the acknowledged fact that Earl Adam was Mackay’s overlord in certain lands, is in fact a transaction between equals.

== Family ==
Iye Roy Mackay, 10th of Strathnaver, married a "celebrated beauty" who was a daughter of Norman, son of Patrick O’Beolan of Carloway on the Isle of Lewis. O’Beolan was the lineal descendant of the family of Applecross, a well known priestly family whose progenitor was St. Maolrubha. This marriage did not conform with canon law, but Iye Roy Mackay secured from James IV of Scotland a precept of legitimation for his two surviving sons, John and Donald. Iye Roy Mackay and his wife had the following children:

1. John Mackay, 11th of Strathnaver, who succeeded his father in 1517.
2. Donald Mackay, 11th of Strathnaver, who succeeded his brother John in 1529.
3. Angus Mackay, who was killed fighting the Rosses, near Tain, before 1511.
4. A daughter, who married Hugh MacLeod of Assynt and had two children: Neil and Helen. Helen MacLeod married her first cousin, Iye Du Mackay, 12th of Strathnaver, to whom she had Donald Balloch Mackay the progenitor of the Mackay of Scoury family, and another son, John Beg Mackay.
5. A daughter, who married the Honl. Alexander Sutherland of Killipheder, son of John, Earl of Sutherland.

Iye Roy Mackay, 10th of Strathnaver died towards the end of 1517.

== See also ==
- Chiefs of Clan Mackay
- Clan Mackay
- Earl of Sutherland
- Clan Ross
- Donald Dubh
