= Robert Sutherland, 6th Earl of Sutherland =

- Earl of Sutherland Coat of Arms
- Born: Unknown
- Died: 1444; Dunrobin Castle, Sutherland, Scotland
- Relatives: William de Moravia, 5th Earl of Sutherland (father); Margaret Stewart (wife); John Sutherland, 7th Earl of Sutherland (son)
- Military career
- Allegiance: Scotland

Robert Sutherland, (died 1444) was the 6th Earl of Sutherland and chief of the Clan Sutherland, a Scottish clan of the Scottish Highlands.

== Early life ==
Robert Sutherland, 6th Earl of Sutherland was the son of Joanna, daughter of Sir John Menteith and William de Moravia, 5th Earl of Sutherland, the surname Sutherland having been fully adopted from the Earldom. According to 17th-century historian Sir Robert Gordon, 1st Baronet, William, 5th Earl of Sutherland had been succeeded by his son, Earl John of Sutherland, who in turn was succeeded by his son Nicolas, Earl of Sutherland, who in turn was succeeded by Robert, Earl of Sutherland. However, according to 19th-century historian William Fraser, upon later investigation it was found that there was no John or Nicolas, Earls of Sutherland in between and that Robert was the son of William, 5th Earl of Sutherland.

== Earl of Sutherland ==
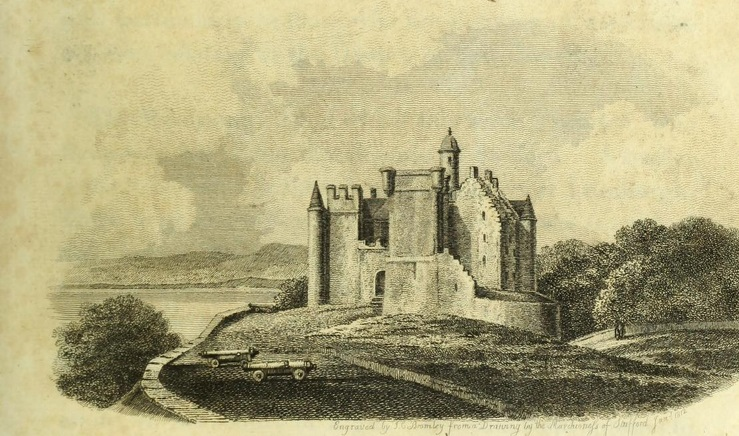
Dunrobin Castle as it appeared in about 1813, before later improvements. The first authentic record of the castle is dated 1401 during the time of Robert Sutherland, 6th Earl of Sutherland

In 1389, Robert is styled Earl of Sutherland when he was a witness to a ecclesiastical decree that was pronounced against Alexander Stewart, Earl of Buchan, who was otherwise known as the Wolf of Badenoch, in regard to his wife Euphemia I, Countess of Ross.

According to Jean Froissart's Chronicles, the Earl of Sutherland attended the meeting of Scottish nobles and their followers at Southdean in the Forest of Jedburgh and which resulted in the Battle of Otterburn in 1388. The Scots intended to take advantage of disputes between the English king and his nobles by making a raid into England on a large scale, partly in retaliation for the English invasion of Richard II of England that had taken place three years before. The Scots divided their force into two unequal parts: the smaller was under James Douglas, 2nd Earl of Douglas which marched to Newcastle upon Tyne and ravaged Durham almost all the way to Yorkshire. On their return the Battle of Otterburn, in which Douglas was slain, was fought, but the Scots defeated the English. Meanwhile, the larger force of Scots under Robert Stewart, Earl of Fife and Archibald Douglas, Lord of Galloway, had entered England by the Western Marches and marched towards Carlisle. It was this larger force that the Earl of Sutherland was part of, but their actions have not been recorded.

On 2 November 1389, the Earl of Sutherland was a witness to a decree made against the Earl of Buchan for him to live with and not mistreat his wife who he had left for a woman named Mariota filia Athyn. The decree was pronounced at the Church of the Friars preachers of Inverness. The next record of Robert, Earl of Sutherland is in 1401 when he granted to his brother Kenneth of Sutherland, and his male heirs, the lands of Drummoy, Torrish and Backies, giving pasture in the Glen to all the inhabitants of Backies. The earl reserved for himself and his heirs the mill of Dunrobin with the running water and fish, except for the fish called "Pellokis" which alone the grantee should be allowed to carry home, with no question from the earl or his heirs. This charter was dated at Dunrobin Castle and is the first authentic record of that castle. Sir Robert Gordon stated that Dunrobin Castle was founded by an earlier Robert, Earl of Sutherland in about 1100 and that it was named after him: "Doun-Robin signefeth the mote or hill of Robert". However, William Fraser stated that this was an "imaginary" Robert, Earl of Sutherland who Gordon had written about.

Henry Sutherland of Torboll, younger son of Nicholas Sutherland, 1st of Duffus, received from Robert, 6th Earl of Sutherland, the £40 lands of Torboll which Nicholas Sutherland had previously resigned to the earl.

Robert, 6th Earl of Sutherland held the earldom for seventy years. According to Gordon, during Robert's chiefship, his clan led by Angus Moray of Aberscross fought against the Clan Mackay at the Battle of Drumnacoub. This battle is also mentioned by the historians George Buchanan (1506-1582) and the 18th century John Pinkerton who quoted the 15th century chronicler, Walter Bower. According to Gordon, Angus Du Mackay, 7th of Strathnaver was at enmity with his cousins Neil Neilson Mackay and Morgan Neilson Mackay. Angus Murray of Aberscross who was a supporter of the Earl of Sutherland, offered his two daughters in marriage to Neil Neilson Mackay and Morgan Neilson Mackay if they were to take the Mackay lands of Strathnaver from Angus Du Mackay. The Earl of Sutherland gave Neil and Morgan the support of all his forces. In the battle, Neil and Morgan were both killed as was their father-in-law Angus Murray. Angus Du Mackay of Strathnaver was also killed but his lands were retained by his sons Neil and John.

== Family ==
Robert, 6th Earl of Sutherland is said to have died in 1442, and Fraser states that he was certainly dead in 1444 when his son John is designated Earl of Sutherland. Robert married Margaret Stewart, daughter of Alexander Stewart, Earl of Buchan (the Wolf of Badenoch) and had three sons:

1. John Sutherland, 7th Earl of Sutherland, heir and successor.
2. Alexander Sutherland of Dunbeath, according to a 1982 study by the Association for Promotion of Scholarship in Genealogy, the 18th-century discovery by Lord Hailes of the 15th century testament of Alexander Sutherland of Dunbeath, shows that he was the second son of Robert Sutherland, 6th Earl of Sutherland. Alexander Sutherland of Dunbeath left two legitimate daughters: Marjory, who married as the second wife to William Sinclair, 1st Earl of Caithness and Mariota (or Marion) who married William Calder, son of William Calder the Thane of Calder or Thane of Cawdor. Alexander Sutherland of Dunbeath also left five illegitimate sons and three illegitimate daughters: Alexander Sutherland who was the Archdeacon of Caithness, Robert Sutherland, Nicholas Sutherland, Edward Sutherland, John Sutherland, Eleanor Sutherland, Catherine Sutherland and Jonet Sutherland.
3. Robert Sutherland, who according to Gordon led the forces that defeated the forces of John of Islay, Earl of Ross at the Battle of Skibo and Strathfleet in 1455, having been sent to do so by his elder brother, John, 7th Earl of Sutherland. According to Gordon, this Robert Sutherland also led a company of Sutherland men on the side of the Clan Mackay at the Battle of Aldy Charrish in the 1480s against the Clan Ross. However, 19th-20th century historian Angus Mackay disputes Sutherland's presence at the battle stating that it would be unlikely that the Earl of Sutherland at the time would have assisted against the Rosses as he was married to a daughter of the Ross chief of Balnagowan, and also that the feudal superiority of the Sutherlands over the Mackays "nowhere existed save in his own fertile imagination". Fraser also adds that if Robert Sutherland was present at this battle then he must have been a very old man. James Fraser of Wardlaw wrote the Wardlaw Manuscript in about 1674 and it states that Robert Sutherland was actually killed at the Battle of Aldy Charrish.
4. Alexander Sutherland, listed by Fraser as of whom nothing more is known other than he may have been the ancestor of Alexander Sutherland of Dilred (or Dirlot) who was killed in 1499.

Peerage of Scotland
Preceded by William de Moravia	Earl of Sutherland c. 1370 – 1444	Succeeded by John Sutherland
