= Chiefs of Clan Mackay =

The Clan Mackay is a highland Scottish clan. The clan chief of Clan Mackay has from early times been designated "of Strathnaver". The chief was also from early times seated at Castle Varrich but later moved to Tongue House in Tongue, Highland. In the 17th century the chief of Clan Mackay was made Lord Reay. The following is a list of the chiefs of Clan Mackay.

Name	Dates	Notes
Aeneas Simon Mackay, 15th Lord Reay	b.1965	Succeed father as Clan Chief 2013 to current
Hugh Mackay, 14th Lord Reay	b. 1937 d. 2013	Also Baron Mackay van Ophemert and Zennewijnen, of the Netherlands. Also Baronet of Strathnaver
Aeneas Alexander Mackay, 13th Lord Reay	d. 1967	
Eric Mackay, 12th Lord Reay	d. 1921	
Donald Mackay, 11th Lord Reay	d. 1921	Rector of St Andrews University from 1884-1886, Governor of Bombay from 1885-1890
Aeneas Mackay, 10th Lord Reay	d. 1876	
Eric Mackay, 9th Lord Reay	d. 1875	Title afterwards passed to the Dutch branch of the Mackays
Alexander Mackay, 8th Lord Reay	d. 1863	Married Marrion Gall
Eric Mackay, 7th Lord Reay	d. 1847	Grandson of George Mackay, 3rd Lord Reay. Succeeded by his brother
Hugh Mackay, 6th Lord Reay	d. 1797	Succeeded by his cousin
George Mackay, 5th Lord Reay	d. 1768	Succeeded by his brother
Donald Mackay, 4th Lord Reay	d. 1761	Married first Marion Dalrymple and second Christian Sutherland
George Mackay, 3rd Lord Reay	d. 1748	Married first Margaret Mackay, second Janet Sinclair and third Mary Doull
Donald Mackay, Master of Reay	d. 1680	Married Ann, daughter of Sir George Munro, 1st of Newmore (also known as of Culrain)
John Mackay, 2nd Lord Reay	d. 1680	Married first Isabella Sinclair and second Barbara Mackay
Donald Mackay, 1st Lord Reay	d. 1649	Married first Barbara, daughter of Mackenzie of Kintail, second Elizabeth Thomson and third Marjory Sinclair
Huistean Du Mackay, 13th of Strathnaver (Hugh)	d. 1614	Married first Elizabeth Sinclair and second Jane Gordon, daughter of the Earl of Sutherland, from whom his sons were born
Iye Du Mackay, 12th of Strathnaver	d. 1572	Married first Helen, daughter of Hugh Macleod of Assynt and second Christian, daughter of John Sinclair of Dun, from whom the chiefly line succeeded
Donald Mackay, 11th of Strathnaver	d. 1550	Brother of John. Married Helen, daughter of Alexander Sinclair of Stempster, second son of the Earl of Caithness, chief of Clan Sinclair
John Mackay, 11th of Strathnaver	d. 1529	Married a daughter of Thomas Fraser, 2nd Lord Lovat
Iye Roy Mackay, 10th of Strathnaver	d. 1517	Married a daughter of Norman O'Beolan of Carloway, Isle of Lewis
Angus Roy Mackay, 9th of Strathnaver	d.1486	Killed at the Battle of Tarbat. Married a daughter of Mackenzie of Kintail, chief of Clan Mackenzie
Neil Mackay, 8th of Strathnaver	d. 1450	Imprisoned on the Bass Rock. Married Euphemia, daughter of George Munro, 10th Baron of Foulis
Angus Du Mackay, 7th of Strathnaver	d. 1433	Married Elizabeth, daughter of John of Islay, Lord of the Isles and his wife Margaret Stewart, who was in turn a daughter of Robert II of Scotland. From who also descends the Mackay of Aberach branch of Clan Mackay
Angus Mackay, 6th of Strathnaver	d. 1403	Married a daughter of Torquil MacLeod of Lewis, chief of the Clan MacLeod of Lewis
Donald Mackay, 5th of Strathnaver	d. 1370	Murdered in Dingwall Castle
Iye Mackay, 4th of Strathnaver	d. 1370	Murdered in Dingwall Castle
Donald Mackay, 3rd of Strathnaver	b. 1265 d.1330	Married a daughter of Iye (MacNeil) of Gigha
Iye Mor Mackay, 2nd of Strathnaver	m. 1263	Married a daughter of Walter de Baltrodin, Bishop of Caithness in 1264
Iye Mackay or MacHeth, 1st of Strathnaver	b. 1210	Possibly son or nephew of Kenneth MacHeth who died in a rebellion against the king of Scots in 1215.
