= Angus McKay =

Angus McKay, MacKay or Mackay may refer to:

== Politicians ==
- Angus Mackay (Victorian politician) (1824–1866), member of the Victorian Legislative Assembly
- Angus Mackay (Queensland politician) (1834–1910), member of the Queensland Legislative Assembly
- Angus McKay (Manitoba politician) (1836–1910), Canadian politician; first aboriginal Canadian elected to the Canadian House of Commons
- Angus McKay (Ontario politician) (1852–1916), physician and politician in Ontario, Canada
- Angus MacKay (Scottish politician) (born 1964), member of the Scottish Parliament

== Others ==
- Angus Mackay, 6th of Strathnaver (died 1403), sixth chief of the Clan Mackay
- Angus Du Mackay, 7th of Strathnaver (died 1433), seventh chief of the Clan Mackay
- Angus Roy Mackay, 9th of Strathnaver (died 1486), ninth chief of the Clan Mackay
- Angus MacKay (actor) (1926–2013), British actor
- Angus McKay, a minor character in the BBC Scottish TV drama Monarch of the Glen
- Gus Mackay (Angus, born 1967), Zimbabwean cricketer
- Angus Mackay (historian) (1939–2016), Scottish historian
- Angus MacKay (piper) (1813–1859), Scottish bagpipe player
- Angus MacKay (1840–1931), superintendent of the Indian Head Experimental Farm
- Angus MacKay (racing driver) (born 1946), British former auto racing driver
