= Mackay of Aberach =

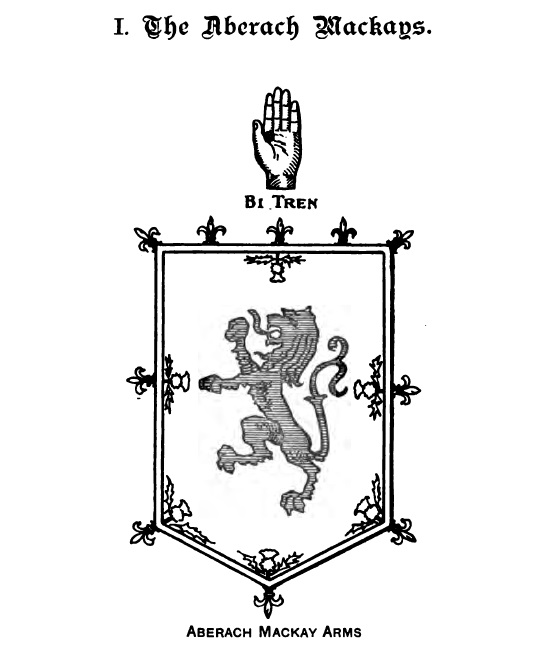
The Mackay of Aberach coat of arms

The Mackays of Aberach also known as the Clan Aberach are a Scottish family and a branch of the ancient Clan Mackay of the Scottish Highlands. They were the senior cadet branch of the Clan Mackay and were seated at Achness, in Strathnaver, which is in modern-day Sutherland. In Scottish Gaelic they are known as the Sleaght-ean Aberigh (descendants of John Aberach).

== John Mackay, I of Aberach ==
John Mackay, 1st of the family of Aberach was a younger son of Angus Du Mackay, 7th of Strathnaver, chief of the Clan Mackay. His mother was a daughter of Alexander Carrach MacDonald, chief of the Clan MacDonald of Keppoch, who in turn was a son of John of Islay, Lord of the Isles (chief of Clan Donald) whose wife was a daughter of Robert II of Scotland.

John Mackay, I of Aberach's older brother, Neil Mackay was imprisoned on the Bass Rock for his part in the Battle of Tuiteam Tarbhach in 1406. Meanwhile, chief Angus Du Mackay's cousins, Neil and Morgan Mackay, had formed an alliance with the Murrays and Clan Sutherland who were enemies of Angus. Neil and Morgan along with the Murrays and Sutherlanders invaded Strathnaver in an attempt to take Angus's lands. However, they were defeated at the Battle of Drumnacoub by the forces of John Mackay, I of Aberach who supported his father, the chief, Angus Du Mackay.

John Mackay, I of Aberach married a daughter of the chief of Clan Mackintosh and left two known sons; William Du Mackay and John Mackay.

== William Du Mackay, II of Aberach ==
William Du Mackay, II of Aberach took a prominent part in the Battle of Aldy Charrish in 1486 against the Clan Ross where chief Alexander Ross 6th of Balnagowan was killed. The Mackays appear to have taken revenge on the Rosses who had killed their chief Angus Roy Mackay at the Battle of Tarbat a year earlier. William Du Mackay married a daughter of Hector Roy Mackenzie of Gairloch and left two known sons; William and Donald.

== William Mackay, III of Aberach ==
William Mackay, III of Aberach was killed in 1517 in the aftermath of the Battle of Torran Dubh which took place at Loch Salchie, between Loch Shin and Oikel. According to the Bute MS he married a daughter of Murray of Tulibardine and had six sons: Thomas, John, Alexander, Murdo and Neil. He was succeeded by his second son John.

== John Williamson Mackay, IV of Aberach ==
John Williamson, IV of Aberach along with nine others was in 1538 summoned to appear before the Lords of Justice in Inverness for alleged “reset and intercommunicating with Donald and William Galdochson, rebels, accused of the slaughter of Donald Henryson and others”. John married the daughter of chief Donald Mackay, 11th of Strathnaver. He left a son, Neil MacEan MacWilliam Mackay and a daughter named Margaret.

== Neil MacEan MacWilliam Mackay, V of Aberach ==
Neil MacEan MacWilliam Mackay, V of Aberach witnessed the sasine to his cousin, chief Iye Du Mackay, 12th of Strathnaver, of the lands of Strathnaver on 20 April 1571. Neil became involved in feuds with the Clan Gunn, which culminated in the Battle of Leckmelm. He later married a daughter of Hector Munro of Contullich Castle and had four sons: Murdo, William Mor, Robert and Neil. In 1542, Neil Mackay of the Aberach family was placed in command of Skibo Castle by his chief Donald Mackay, 11th of Strathnaver.

== Murdo Mackay, VI of Aberach ==
Murdo Mackay, VI of Aberach held the lands of Gnubmore in wadset as cautioner to chief Donald Mackay, 1st Lord Reay. He married on 15 April 1615 to Christina, daughter of Donald Balloch of Scoury, and left several children: John, Robert, Neil, and Ann.

== John Mackay, VII of Aberach ==
John Mackay, VII of Aberach was, according to historian Angus Mackay, known as a man of “pronounced piet” and strongly sympathetic with the persecuted Scottish Covenanters during the Wars of the Three Kingdoms. He married Christina, daughter of the Rev. Alexander Munro, poet and preacher of Durness and left one son, William.

== Rev. William Mackay, VIII of Aberach ==
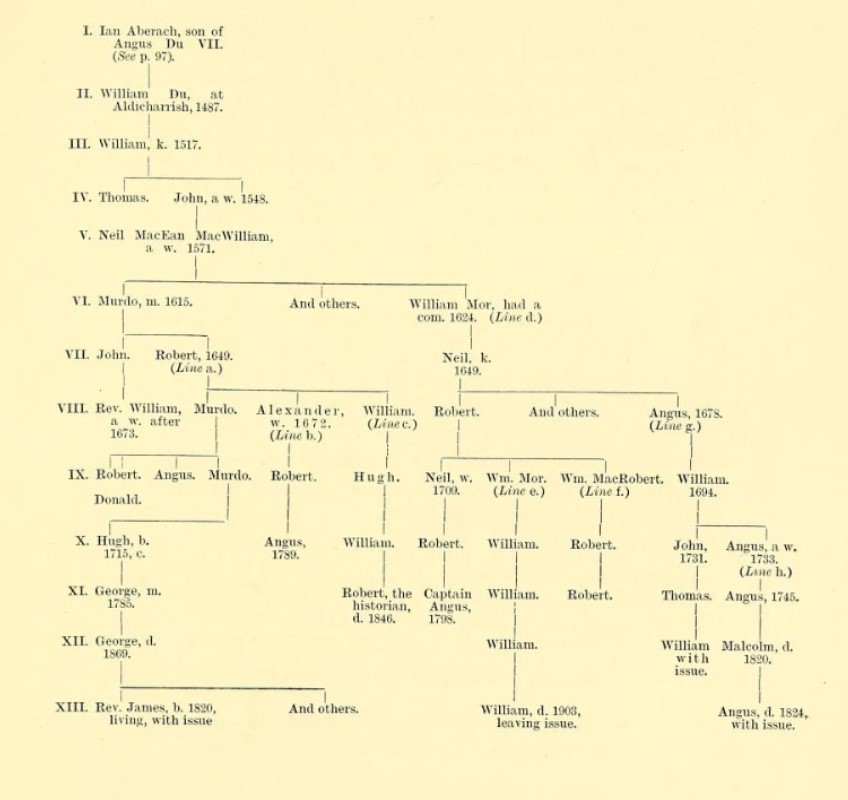
Mackay of Aberach Family Tree

Rev. William Mackay, VII of Aberach was the minister of Dornoch. A document from 1673 records him as the ‘’Aberach chieftain’’. He married Jane, daughter of John Dunbar, Ballie of Elgin and left three sons: John; George, Sheriff-Depute of Moray; and Hugh, all of whom died without issue. William Mackay was succeeded as the Aberach chieftain by Robert Mackay, grandson of the second son of Murdo Mackay VI of Aberach.

== Robert Mackay, IX of Aberach ==
Robert Mackay, IX of Aberach was taken prisoner at Balveny, along with the chief, the 2nd Lord Reay in 1649. He married Isabella Munro and had issue: Murdo, Alexander, John, William, Janet and Christina. The next Aberach chieftain was Hugh Mackay who was son of Murdo Mackay, brother of Robert, IX of Aberach.

== Hugh Mackay, X of Aberach ==
Hugh Mackay, born in about 1715 was commonly known as “Huistean McCorrichie”. He had a tack of Brae Strathy and married Catherine, daughter of John Mackay of Lettermore House overlooking Loch Loyal. Hugh died in 1797 leaving three sons and two daughters: George, Murdo, John, Isabella and Barbara.

== George Mackay, XI of Aberach ==
George Mackay, XI of Aberach married Catherine, daughter of George Mackay of Arichliney, Kildonan, Sutherland. During the Highland Clearances he sold out and removed to Wick where he died in 1840. He had seven sons and three daughters including: George, John, Hugh, Robert, Angus, William, James, Elizabeth, Jessie and Andrew.

== George Mackay, XII of Aberach ==
George Mackay, XII of Aberach became a merchant in Inverness in 1811, in partnership with his maternal uncle, Captain Robert Mackay of Hedgefield and continued the business for over fifty years. He married in Inverness on 16 Oct 1819, Lillias, 2nd daughter of Duncan Grant of Dalshangie, Inverness. George died in 1869 leaving eight sons and three daughters including: Rev.Dr. James, Robert, Dr. Duncan, Hugh, George Grant, Lillias, Rev. John, Catherine, Joseph and William.

== Rev. Dr. James Mackay, XIII of Aberach ==
Rev. Dr. James Mackay, XIII of Aberach was born in Inverness on 5th Sept 1820. He was a chaplain during the Indian Mutiny for which he was awarded a medal. He married firstly Lucretia Livingstone Reed with whom he had two sons and one daughter: Lieutenant-Colonel James Livingstone of the 8th Bengal Cavalry, George Robert and Lillias. He married secondly Margaret Fowler but without issue.

== John Mackay of Moudale ==
A notable member of the Mackay of Aberach family is Ensign John Mackay of Moudale. A cadet of the Mackays of Aberach, he is famous for leading an Independent Highland Company of soldiers in support of the British Government during the Jacobite rising of 1745. He and his men defeated a Jacobite force in what is now known as the Battle of Littleferry in 1746. Historian Angus Mackay stated that John Mackay of Moudale was a “hero” as he also captured the Jacobite commander George Mackenzie, 3rd Earl of Cromartie. John Mackay of Moudale descended directly from a younger son of Neil MacEan MacWilliam, V of Aberach.

Angus Mackay also quotes a short poem about John Mackay of Moudale in gaelic:

Cuis ardain nan Aberach, Laimh laidir nach bagradh, Ian failteach macRaibert ‘icNeil

Which translates in English as:

The pride of the Aberachs, Strong hand without menace, Genial John, the son of Robert, son of Neil

== Bibliography ==
- Gordon, Sir Robert (1813) [Printed from original manuscript 1580 - 1656]. A Genealogical History of the Earldom of Sutherland. Edinburgh: Printed by George Ramsay & Co for Archibald Constable & Co.
- Mackay, Angus (1906). The Book of Mackay. 25 George IV Bridge, Edinburgh: Norman MacLeod.
- Mackay, Robert (1829). History of the House and Clan of Mackay. 233 High Street, Edinburgh: Printed for the author by Andrew Jack & Co.
