= Angus Roy Mackay, 9th of Strathnaver =

Angus Roy Mackay, 9th of Strathnaver (died 1486), was the ninth chief of the ancient Clan Mackay, a Scottish clan of the Scottish Highlands.

== Early life ==
Angus Roy Mackay, 9th of Strathnaver, was the eldest son of Neil Mackay, 8th of Strathnaver, and his wife who was a daughter of George Munro, 10th Baron of Foulis, chief of Clan Munro. His maternal grandmother, through Munro of Foulis, was a daughter of Ross of Balnagown, chief of Clan Ross.

The blood feud that had raged since 1370 between the Clan Mackay and the Clan Sutherland had become assuaged, so much so that one of Angus Roy Mackay's daughters married Sutherland of Dirlot.

== Feud with the Clan Gunn ==
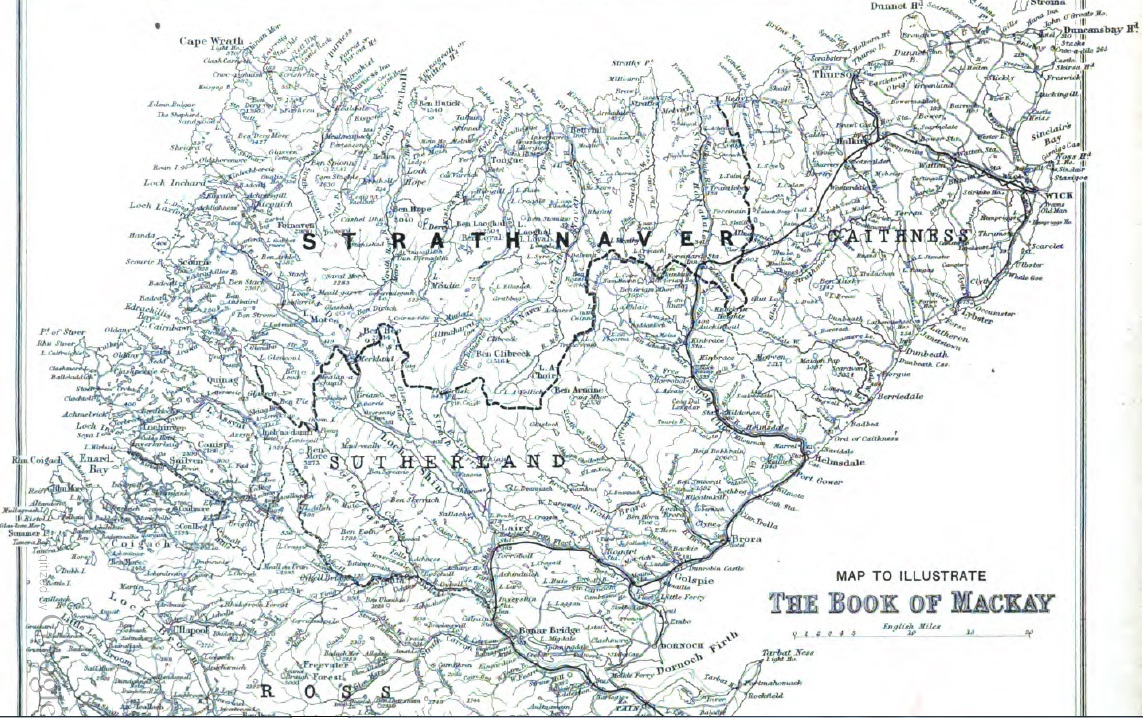
Map showing the Mackay chief's territory of Strathnaver in relation to Caithness, Sutherland and Ross to the south

The Keiths who lived in Caithness were akin to the Sutherlands of Dirlot, both families having obtained their lands in Caithness through marriage with daughters of Reginald Cheyne (of Clan Cheyne). According to historian Angus Mackay, it is probable that the chief of Clan Gunn, who was a man of great power and the Crowner of Caithness, resented the intrusion of the Keiths who were newcomers to the area. The Clan Keith of Aberdeenshire had great influence at court through their chief, the Earl Marischal. In Caithness relations became so hostile that the Keiths were determined to crush the Gunns if possible.

According to Sir Robert Gordon, 1st Baronet, the Keiths "mistrusting" their own forces "sent to Angus Mackay entreating him to come to their aid", which he did. According to historian Angus Mackay it is not known exactly why Mackay chose to support the Keiths, but it could have been partly because of the prospect of plunder, but also because at the time Sir Gilbert Keith of Inverguie was collector of customs for Caithness, Strathnaver and Sutherland, and in this function might have crossed the Gunns and befriended the Mackays, securing Mackay's help. As such in 1464 Angus Roy Mackay advanced on Caithness where the Battle of Tannach took place. The Mackays were joined by the Keiths and the MacLeods of Assynt. The Gunns were defeated being overwhelmed by numbers, but not without great slaughter on both sides. Soon after this the Keiths massacred the Gunn chief and some his sons in what is now known as the Battle of Champions. The Parliament of 1478 took measures to end the blood-shed in Ross, Sutherland and Caithness.

== Feud with the Clan Ross ==
A feud later broke out with the Clan Ross whose chiefs were the Rosses of Balnagown Castle. According to the Blackcastle MS (which was written by Alexander Mackay of Blackcastle who had access to the Mackay chief's family charters and papers) the Rosses had made "a predatory incursion" into the territory of the Mackays. Sir Robert Gordon however says that the Mackays "often molested with incursions and invasions" the lands of the Rosses. According to historian Angus Mackay the evidence is ample that the Mackays managed to recover some of the lands in Ross-shire that had belonged to their relatives and enemies, Neil Neilson Mackay, his brother Morgan Neilson Mackay and Neil and Morgan's father-in-law Murray of Cubin, all three of whom had been defeated and killed by the Mackays of Strathnaver at the Battle of Drumnacoub in 1433. The evidence is also ample that the Rosses managed to secure some of these lands lying in the parishes of Edderton and Kincardine in Ross-shire. So it appears that the feud between the Mackays and the Rosses arose out of a scramble for disputed lands. Angus Roy Mackay having made various expeditions into Ross was at last overpowered in what is now known as the Battle of Tarbat, and taking refuge in the church of Tarbat which was set on fire, he was burnt to death in 1486.

== Family ==
Angus Roy Mackay married a daughter of Mackenzie of Kintail, chief of Clan Mackenzie and had the following children:

1. Iye Roy Mackay, 10th of Strathnaver, successor as chief of the Clan Mackay.
2. John Rivach Mackay, who led the Mackays to avenge his father's death and defeated the Rosses at the Battle of Aldy Charrish in 1487 where the Ross chief was killed. However, John Rivach Mackay himself was killed in 1513 fighting the English at the Battle of Flodden.
3. A daughter who married Hector Mackenzie of Auchterned, son of Hector Roy Mackenzie of Gairloch.
4. A daughter who married Sutherland of Dirlot.

== See also ==
- Chiefs of Clan Mackay
- Clan Mackay
