= Clan Mackay =

Highland Scottish clan

- Mac Aoidh/Clann Mhic Aoidh or Sìol Mhorgain
- Crest: A dagger held erect
- Motto: Manu forti ("With a strong hand")
- War cry: Bratach gheal Chlann Maccaoidh!

Profile
- Region: Highland
- District: Strathnaver
- Plant badge: Bulrush
- Pipe music: Bratach Bhan Chlann Aoidh (The White Banner of MacKay)

Chief
- Æneas Simon Mackay
- 15th Lord Reay (Morair Maghrath)
- Historic seat: Castle Varrich
Septs of Clan Mackay
Allan, Bain, Bayne, Kay, Key, MacAllan, MacBain, MacCaa, MacCaw, MacCay, MacGaa, MacGaw, MacGee, MacGhee, MacGhie, MacKee, Mackie, MacPhail, MacQue, MacQuey, McKay, MacQuoid, MacVail, MacVain, MacVane, Morgan, Neilson, Nelson, Paul, Pole, Poleson, Polson, Reay, Scobie, Williamson.
Clan branches
Mackay of Strathnaver (chiefs)
Mackay of Aberach (senior cadets)
Mackay of Ardbrecknish
Mackay of Ardoch
Mackay of Scoury
Mackay of Borley
Mackay of Bighouse
Mackay of Inveralmond
Mackay of Kirtomy
Mackay of Strathy
Mackay of Skerray
Mackay of Borgie
Mackay of Melness
Mackay of Sandwood
Mackay of Whitehouse
Mackay of Achmonie
Mackay of Galloway
Mackay of Argyle and the West
Mackay of Clashfern
In other countries:
Mackay of the Netherlands (the current chief was from this branch)
Mackay of Sweden
Mackie of Carrickbraith
Allied clans
Clan Munro
Clan Forbes
Clan Morrison
Clan Gunn (18th century)
Clan Ross (18th century)
Clan Sutherland (18th century)
Rival clans
Clan Sinclair
Clan Donald
Clan Gunn (15th century)
Clan Ross (15th century)
Clan Sutherland (15th & 16th centuries)

Clan Mackay (/məˈkaɪ/ mə-KY; Scottish Gaelic: Clann Mhic Aoidh [ˈkʰl̪ˠãũn̪ˠ vĩçˈkʲɤj]) is an ancient and once-powerful Highland Scottish clan from the far north of the Scottish Highlands, but with roots in the old Kingdom of Moray.

They supported Robert the Bruce during the Wars of Scottish Independence in the 14th century. In the centuries that followed they were anti-Jacobite. The territory of Clan Mackay consisted of the parishes of Farr, Tongue, Durness and Eddrachillis, and was known as Strathnaver, in the north-west of the county of Sutherland. However, it was not until 1829 that Strathnaver was considered part of Sutherland, when the chief sold his lands to the Earls of Sutherland and the Highland Clearances then had dire consequences for the clan.

In the 17th century the Mackay chief's territory had extended to the east to include the parish of Reay in the west of the neighbouring county of Caithness. The chief of the clan is Lord Reay and the lands of Strathnaver later became known as the Reay Country.

== History ==
=== Origins of the clan ===
Historian Angus Mackay in his Book of Mackay (1906) compares two different genealogies of the early chiefs of the Clan Mackay. The first is by Sir Robert Gordon, a 17th-century historian and the second by Alexander Mackay of Blackcastle, an 18th- to 19th-century historian who had access to the charters and historical documents of the Mackay chief's family. Both genealogies have similarities but there are also significant differences given for the ancestry of the Mackay chiefs. Gordon's genealogy also claims that the chiefs of the Clan Mackay shared a common ancestor with both the chiefs of the Clan Forbes (Note: Historian Sir Robert Gordon, writing in about 1615 - 1630, in his lineage of the Mackay chiefs stated that the Mackays were descended from one Walter, who was said to be the bastard son of the predecessor of the Lord Forbes who at that time was not of the surname Forbes. Historian Angus Mackay, in his "Book of Mackay" (1906) states that there is documentary evidence from about 1500 to 1715 that shows a close friendship between the two families so as to strongly confirm the tradition that they were of kindred stock. However, Angus Mackay does not accept the lineage given by Sir Robert Gordon, and instead accepts the lineage given in Alexander Mackay's Blackcastle Manuscript. The tradition of a shared ancestry between the Mackays and Forbeses was later recorded by two other 17th-century historians: Sir Thomas Urquhart of Cromarty recorded in 1652 that the Mackays, Urquharts and Forbeses were all of the same stock and in 1667 William Forbes recorded that the same three families shared a common ancestor. The Mackays and Urquharts of Cromarty had shortly before the account of 1652 was written also been on very good terms: they had been associated in 1649 when Inverness was captured by the royalists and Captain Mackay of Borley had led some men alongside the Urquhart Knight of Cromarty at the Battle of Worcester in 1651.) and chiefs of Clan Farquharson. Historian Angus Mackay gives evidence that explains that Gordon's theory of the connection to the Forbeses was due to an extremely strong alliance between the two families that began during the 16th century in a long feud with the Gordon family. (Note: Throughout the 16th century a feud was fought between the Clan Forbes and Clan Gordon in which the Mackays were strong supporters of the Forbeses. There were conflicts and murders between the Gordons and Forbeses in the 1520s, 1530s right up until 1571 when the Battle of Tillieangus and Battle of Craibstone were fought, and the two clans were even on opposing sides at the Battle of Glenlivet in 1594. The Mackays had been on such good terms with the Forbeses that the sons of chief Iye Du Mackay, who died in 1572, even went to the length of calling themselves "Mackay-Forbes". While the Clan Forbes feuded with the Gordon Earls of Huntly, the Mackays feuded with their cousins the Gordon Earls of Sutherland.) The Blackcastle MS shows that the Mackay chiefs were related to the Farquharsons but gives a different connection to that given by Gordon. Angus Mackay analyses what evidence is available to support each of the two genealogies and concludes that the one given in Alexander Mackay's Blackcastle Manuscript is by far the most accurate.

The Blackcastle MS claims that Iye Mackay, 1st chief of the Clan Mackay, who was born in about 1210, was a descendant of Malcolm MacHeth, 1st Earl of Ross who died in about 1168. Malcolm MacHeth, Earl of Ross may well have been related to the early rulers or Mormaers of Moray. According to Angus Mackay, sometime in the 1160s, the MacHeths and their supporters after conflict with king Malcolm IV of Scotland fled northwards over the hills of Ross into Strathnaver, where they were welcomed by the Norse Harald Maddadsson, Mormaer of Caithness who was then an enemy of the king. In 1215, the MacHeths along with the MacWilliams retaliated against the king but were defeated by Fearchar, Earl of Ross and the grandson of Malcolm MacHeth, Kenneth MacHeth was killed. According to Angus Mackay it is possible that from this Kenneth MacHeth the Stathnaver Mackays are descended, and that Iye Mackay, 1st chief of Clan Mackay may well have been his son or nephew. According to the Blackcastle MS Iye Mackay's son was Iye Mor Mackay, 2nd chief of Clan Mackay who married a daughter of Walter, Bishop of Caithness in 1263.

=== Wars of Scottish Independence ===
According to Major-General Stewart, the Mackays were amongst the clans who supported Robert the Bruce at the Battle of Bannockburn in 1314. Later in the 14th century, in 1370, chief Iye Mackay, 4th of Strathnaver and his son were murdered at Dingwall Castle by Nicholas Sutherland, 1st of Duffus, head of one of the junior branches of Clan Sutherland. Much bloodshed followed, including a retaliatory raid on Dornoch in 1372. The cathedral was once again set on fire and many Sutherland men were hanged in the town square. After this, the feud quietened down as both sides were called away to fight against the English.

=== 15th century and clan conflicts ===
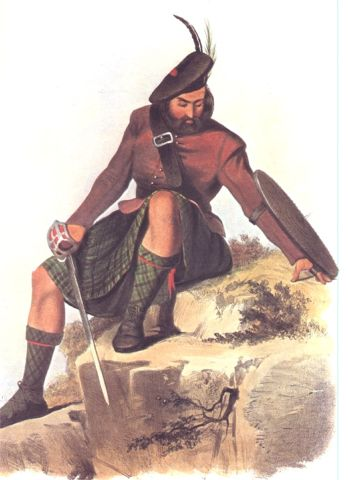
A Victorian era romantic illustration of a MacKay clansman by R. R. McIan.

In 1403, the Battle of Tuiteam Tarbhach was fought between Clan Mackay and Clan MacLeod of Lewis: Chief Angus Mackay, 6th of Strathnaver had married the sister of the MacLeod of Lewis. MacLeod found that his sister had been mistreated and he decided to spoil Strathnaver and Brae-Chat in Sutherland but in the ensuing battle MacLeod was killed.

In 1411, Donald of Islay, Lord of the Isles challenged the Stewart royal family for the Earldom of Ross. Chief Angus Du Mackay, 7th of Strathnaver joined the Stewart Confederacy and the Battle of Dingwall took place in which Donald of the Isles defeated Mackay and imprisoned him on one of his castles on the coast. However, after the battle, Donald made peace with Angus and gave him in marriage his sister, Elizabeth. She was a granddaughter of Robert II of Scotland, indicating how important the Clan Mackay had become.

In 1426, the Battle of Harpsdale took place where Chief Angus Du Mackay, 7th of Strathnaver, with his son Neil, laid waste to Caithness. The inhabitants of Caithness assembled and fought Angus Du at Harpsdale, where there was great slaughter on both sides. In August 1428, James I of Scotland came to Inverness, intending to inflict his rule on the Highland chiefs, including Angus Du Mackay who submitted himself to the King's mercy, and gave his son Neil as a pledge of his future obedience. The King accepted, and sent Neil Mackay to remain in captivity on the Bass Rock, in the Firth of Forth; he was afterwards called Neil Bhasse or Whasse.

Sometime between 1429 and 1433, the Battle of Drumnacoub took place where Angus Du Mackay, 7th of Strathnaver defeated the Clan Sutherland who were led by Angus Moray. This battle is also mentioned by the historians George Buchanan (1506–1582) and the 18th century John Pinkerton who quoted the 15th century chronicler, Walter Bower. In 1437, a conflict known as the Sandside Chase took place where men of Caithness were overthrown by Neil Bhasse Mackay, 8th of Strathnaver after his release from the Bass Rock following the assassination of James I.

In 1464, the Battle of Tannach took place where the Clan Mackay, under Angus Roy Mackay, 9th of Strathnaver, and the Clan Keith defeated the Clan Gunn of Caithness.

In the late 15th century the Clan Mackay and Clan Ross had long been at feud. This resulted in the Battle of Tarbat in 1486 where the Mackays were defeated by the Rosses and chief Angus Roy Mackay, 9th of Strathnaver was killed. This was followed by the Battle of Aldy Charrish where the Rosses were defeated by the Mackays and the Ross chief was killed along with many of his clan. According to 17th-century historian Sir Robert Gordon, who was a younger son of Alexander Gordon, 12th Earl of Sutherland, the Clan Sutherland joined the side of the Clan Mackay at this battle. However, 19th-century historian Angus Mackay disputes the Sutherland's presence at the battle stating that it would be unlikely that the Earl of Sutherland at the time would have assisted against the Rosses as he was married to a daughter of the Ross chief of Balnagowan, and also that the feudal superiority of the Sutherlands over the Mackays "nowhere existed save in his own fertile imagination".

=== 16th century and clan conflicts ===
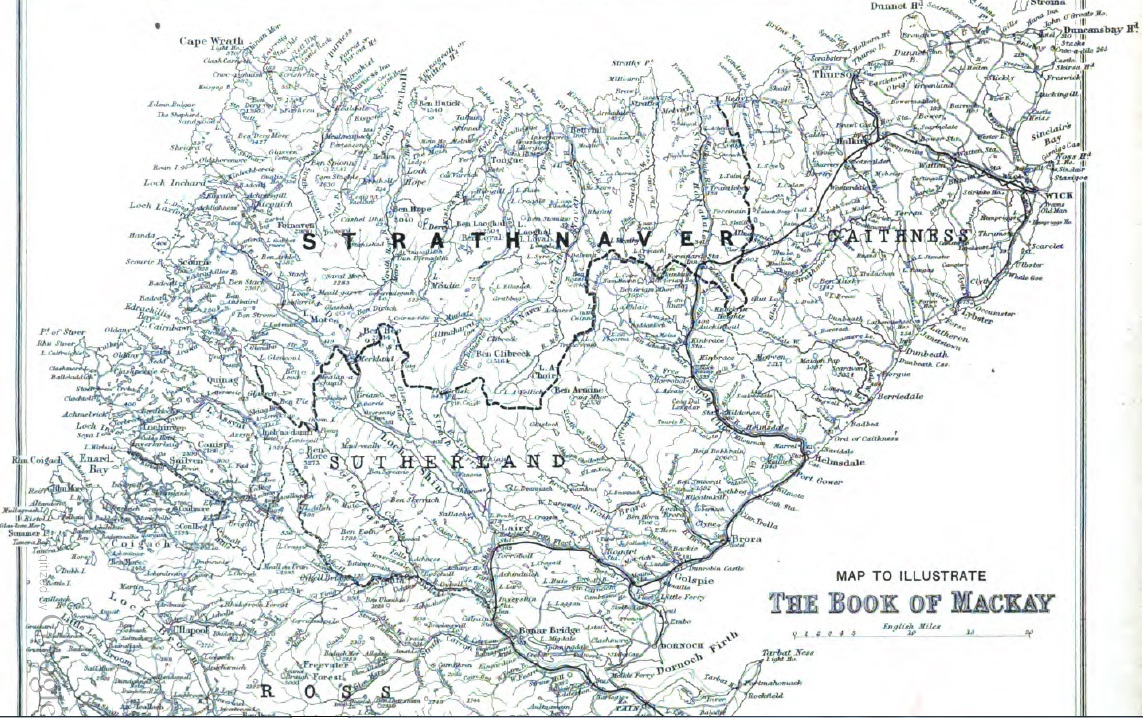
Map showing the territory of the Clan Mackay that was known as Strathnaver in relation to Sutherland and Caithness. The boundary is marked with a dashed line. (click to enlarge)

Towards the end of the 15th century and at the beginning of the 16th century, chief Iye Roy Mackay, 10th of Strathnaver supported the Scottish Crown against the rebellion of Donald Dubh with much success. However, it is Clan Cameron tradition that in 1505, the Cameron chief who supported Donald Dubh, defeated a joint force of Mackays and Munros at Battle of Achnashellach. In 1513, chief Iye Roy Mackay, 10th of Strathnaver along with his brother, John Riavach Mackay, led the Mackays at the Battle of Flodden, where John Riavach was killed along with many of his clansmen.

According to historian Sir Robert Gordon, who himself was a son of Alexander Gordon, 12th Earl of Sutherland, in 1517, the Battle of Torran Dubh took place where the Clan Sutherland defeated the Clan Mackay who were led by John Mackay, 11th of Strathnaver. However, historian Angus Mackay disputes Gordon's account and says that the battle was actually fought by the Mackays against the Rosses, Murrays and Gunns, and not against the Sutherlands. According to Sir Robert Gordon, in 1522, Alexander Gordon (the Earl of Sutherland's eldest son) overthrew John Mackay of Strathnaver at Lairg, and forced him to submit himself to the Earl of Sutherland, to whom John Mackay gave a bond of manrent and service. However, historian Angus Mackay disputes Gordon's account that there was even a skirmish and says that John Mackay was simply renewing the bond of friendship in 1522 with Alexander Gordon, that he had previously made with Alexander Gordon's father, Adam Gordon, in 1518. In 1528, the Mackays, who were then at feud with the Gordon, Earls of Sutherland are associated with Clan Forbes who were then at feud with the Gordon, Earls of Huntly, chiefs of Clan Gordon. According to the book Conflicts of the Clans which was published in 1764, in 1542 the Battle of Alltan-Beath took place where the Clan Mackay were defeated by the Clan Sutherland. According to historian Sir Robert Gordon, in 1542, chief Donald Mackay, 11th of Strathnaver was captured by the Gordon Earls of Sutherland and Huntly, and imprisoned in Foulis Castle. However, this is disputed by historian Angus Mackay.

In 1542, chief Iye Du Mackay, 12th of Strathnaver and his followers fought against the English at the Battle of Solway Moss. In 1544, Mackay joined the Earl of Arran at the Battle of Glasgow and in 1548 he joined in the Siege of Haddington.

In 1555, the Siege of Borve Castle took place where the castle capitulated and chief Iye Du Mackay, 12th of Strathnaver was captured by the Sutherlands, imprisoned at Dumbarton Castle, and later in Edinburgh Castle. According to Sir Robert Gordon, son of the Earl of Sutherland, the siege was followed by the Battle of Garbharry which was the last battle between the Mackays of Strathnaver and the Earls of Sutherland. In 1562, the Battle of Corrichie took place where the Mackays supported Mary, Queen of Scots against George Gordon, 4th Earl of Huntly.

In 1586, the Battle of Allt Camhna took place where the chief's younger brother William Mackay, 1st of Bighouse, assisted the Clan Gunn in a victory over the Clan Sinclair of Caithness. This was followed by the Battle of Leckmelm where the Mackay of Aberach branch of the clan assisted the Earl of Sutherland in defeating the Clan Gunn. In 1588, chief Huistean Du Mackay, 13th of Strathnaver joined the Earl of Sutherland and married his daughter the following year. In 1590, the chief's half-brother, Donald Balloch Mackay, led a company of archers at the Battle of Clynetradwell in support of the Earl of Caithness but he later sided with the Earl of Sutherland.

=== 17th century ===
==== Thirty Years' War ====
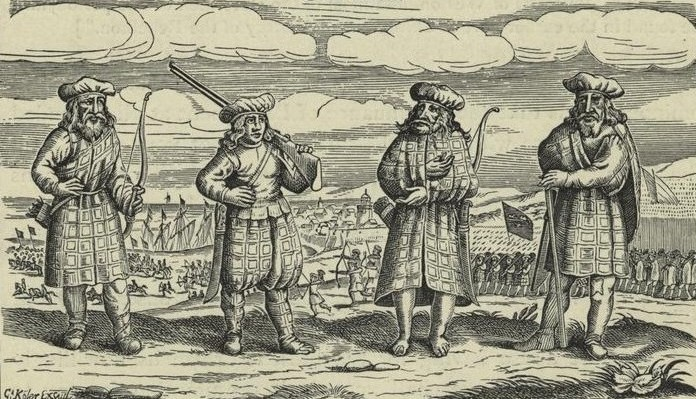
A 17thC German print assumed to show men of Mackay's Regiment in Stettin during the Thirty Years' War. The original caption states, "They are a strong and hardy people who survive on little food. If they have no bread, they eat roots [turnips may be intended]. When necessary, they can cover more than 20 German miles in a day's forced march. [1 German mile = 4¾ English miles] Besides muskets, they carry bows, quivers and long swords."

In April 1616 chief Donald Mackay went to London with his uncle, Sir Robert Gordon, and was knighted by the king. In 1626, Sir Donald Mackay embarked with 3000 men at Cromarty under Count Mansfeld for the Thirty Years' War in the service of the king of Denmark alongside their colonel, Robert Monro. In March 1627 Sir Donald Mackay was created a Baronet of Nova Scotia, and in 1628 was elevated in the peerage as Lord Reay. In 1630, Donald Mackay, 1st Lord Reay accompanied his regiment to Germany, and was present at the capture of Stettin and Colberg. The following year in 1631 Lord Reay was empowered by Charles I of England to raise another force of men for service with Gustavus Adolphus, king of Sweden. He quarreled with David Ramsay at the English Court and, having challenged him to a duel, both were imprisoned in the Tower of London to preserve the peace. During 1632, Gustavus Adolphus, king of Sweden was killed at the Battle of Lützen and Lord Reay was not repaid large sums of money due to him by the king.

==== Civil War ====
In 1638, James Graham, 1st Marquess of Montrose and the Lords Home, Boyd and Loudoun invited Donald Mackay, 1st Lord Reay to meet them and others to consider the religious troubles of the time and to sign the Covenant, which he did unwillingly, along with his son, John Mackay, Master of Reay, because of his long attachment to Charles I. In 1644, like Montrose, Lord Reay again espouses the cause of Charles I of England in the English Civil War, and aided Lord Crawford for several months at the Siege of Newcastle, in the defence of the city against the Scots army. When the town was captured by General Leslie, Lord Reay and Lord Crawford were sent as prisoners to Edinburgh Castle. In 1645, following Montrose's victory at the Battle of Kilsyth, Lord Reay was liberated from imprisonment and returned home. In January 1649 Charles I was executed. Donald Mackay, 1st Lord Reay having fought for Charles I during the civil war was to be created Earl of Strathnaver but the royal patent was not completed and Reay went into exile in Denmark where he died in February 1649.

In 1651, a company of men from the Clan Mackay led by William Mackay of Borley fought at the Battle of Worcester in England under the Duke of Hamilton in support of Charles II of England.

In 1680, George Mackay, 3rd Lord Reay succeeded his grandfather and for the next fourteen years was under the guardianship of his maternal grandfather Sir George Munro of Culrain. In 1689, General Hugh Mackay garrisoned 100 Mackays in Brahan Castle, seat of Mackenzie, Earl of Seaforth to keep check on the Mackenzies. General Hugh Mackay, was made Commander-in-Chief in Scotland by William, Prince of Orange. He was defeated at the Battle of Killiecrankie but he won the campaign against John Graham of Claverhouse, 1st Viscount of Dundee, who was killed at Killiecrankie. General Hugh Mackay was mortally wounded at the Battle of Steinkirk in 1692. The son of the second Lord Reay was The Hon. Aeneas Mackay, Brigadier-General who had a prolonged military service in Scotland, Ireland and on the continent. He died in Bath, Somerset in 1697 and there is a monument to him in Bath Cathedral.

=== 18th century and Jacobite risings ===
==== Jacobite rising of 1715 ====
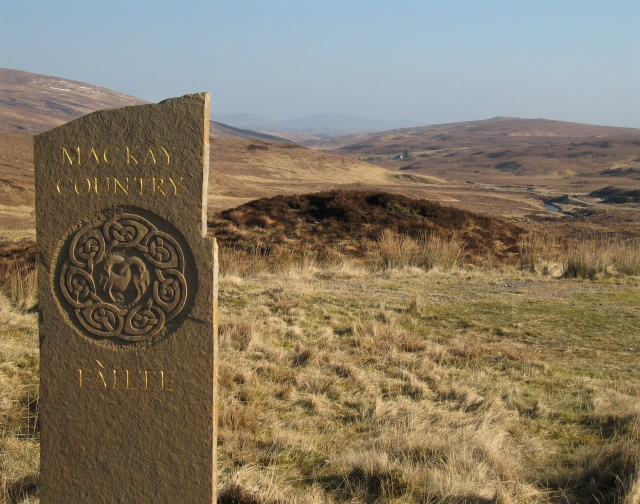
In 2004 six "Mackay Country" signs were installed welcoming people to the area that was once the territory of the clan. They were placed at Kylesku, Achfary (both in parish of Eddrachillis), Forsinard, Dalvina, Crask (all three in parish of Farr) and one on the A836 road at the border between the counties of Caithness and Sutherland. In 2014 the latter was vandalized.

During the Jacobite rising of 1715 the Clan Mackay were anti-Jacobite, taking the side of George I of Great Britain and defending Inverness Castle against the Jacobites. The Mackays were also present at the Skirmish of Alness in 1715 against Mackenzie, Earl of Seaforth. In 1719, a detachment of 80 men from the Clan Mackay fought at the Battle of Glen Shiel where they defeated the Jacobites.

==== Jacobite rising of 1745 ====
During the Jacobite rising of 1745 the Clan Mackay again supported the British Government and the Mackay Independent Highland Companies, along with some men from Loudon's Highlanders regiment, intercepted and captured gold which had been sent from France to the Jacobite leader Charles Edward Stuart, in what become known as the Skirmish of Tongue. Independent Highland Companies formed from the Clan Mackay, that were led by Ensign John Mackay, fought at the Battle of Littleferry in 1746 where they defeated the Jacobites and also captured the Jacobite George Mackenzie, 3rd Earl of Cromartie at Dunrobin Castle.

== Later clansmen ==
In 1806, the "Mackay's Society" was founded in Glasgow. In 1815, at the Battle of Waterloo, the 79th Highland Regiment of Foot formed a square upon being attacked by French Cavalry, and piper Kenneth Mackay, showing no fear, marched out of the square playing the tune "War or Peace". He was subsequently presented with a set of Silver Pipes by the King's own hand for his bravery. In 1815–1818 the Highland Clearances began to take effect on the Mackay lands, by which the people were removed to make room for sheep. In 1829, the Reay estate was sold to the Countess of Sutherland by Eric, 7th Lord Reay.

In 1865, David Mackay won the Victoria Cross by taking the colours of the Punjabis during an attack on the fortification of Sercunderbah in India. The mutineers were the 2nd Battalion of Punjabis, the only Sikh regiment to mutiny. Later in the day David Mackay was shot while attacking a second fort at Shah Neijeef and was returned to Britain to recover.

In 1875, on the death of Eric Mackay, 9th Lord Reay, who was unmarried, the title passed to the branch of the family resident in Holland and who were descended from John Mackay, 2nd Lord Reay. Æneas Mackay, a Baron of the Netherlands, Vice President of the Council of State and holder of the Cross of the Order of the Netherlands, became 10th Lord Reay. He died in 1876. His son, Donald James Mackay, succeeded as 11th Lord Reay, left Holland and was made a Peer of the United Kingdom as Baron Reay of Durness (8 October 1881) with a seat in the House of Lords. He was appointed Governor of Bombay (1885–90) and Under-Secretary of State for India (1894–95) and was Lord Lieutenant of Roxburghshire. In 1900, in South Africa, John Frederick MacKay, serving with the Gordon Highlanders at the Battle of Crow's Nest Hill, North Johannesburg, wins the highest award, the Victoria Cross.

== Castles ==
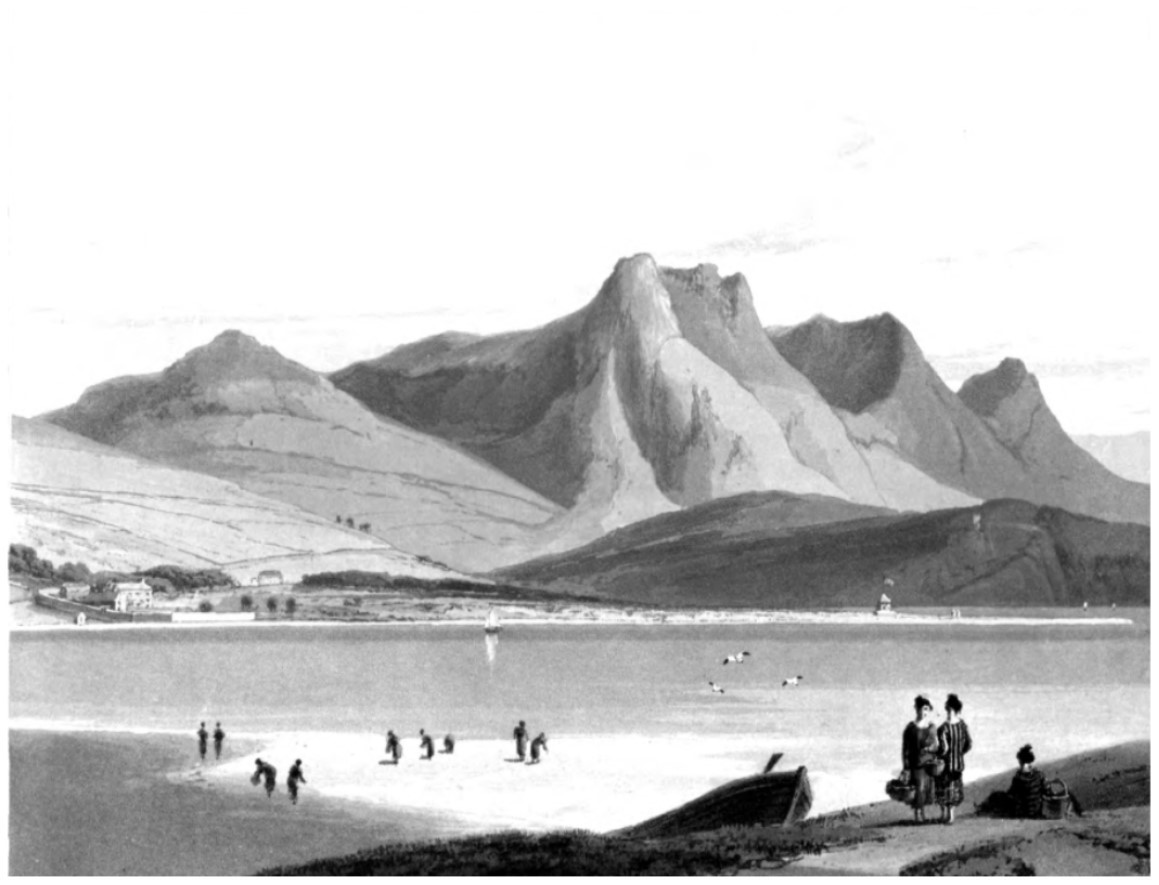
Tongue Bay, Sutherland, c.1822, with the House of Tongue in the background which was formerly the seat of the chiefs of the Clan Mackay after they abandoned Castle Varrich and Borve Castle in the 16th century

- Castle Varrich in Tongue, Sutherland was the ancient seat of the chief of Clan Mackay but the chief later moved to the House of Tongue, Sutherland (still in private ownership). Castle Varrich, also known as Caisteal Bharraich, was originally held by the Bishops of Caithness before being held by the Mackays.
- House of Tongue in Tongue, Sutherland was the main seat of the Mackay chief, Lord Reay. The House of Tongue was later acquired by the Dukes of Sutherland and is still held by them. It is occasionally open to the public.
- Borve Castle in Farr, Sutherland was used by the ancient Clan Mackay as an outpost for raiding other clans. It was also known as Farr Castle.
- Balnakeil House, at Balnakeil, parish of Durness was held by the Mackays from 1611 onwards. Balnakeil House, standing about 100 metres from Balnakeil Church was reckoned, by Dr Ian Grimble, to be second in magnificence only to the chief's seat at Tongue House.
- Bighouse near Thurso was held by the Mackay of Bighouse branch of the clan and is now an exclusive hotel and restaurant.
- Dirlot Castle near Watten, Caithness was originally held by the Cheynes, then by the Clan Gunn, then by the Clan Sutherland and then by the Clan Mackay from 1499 onwards.
- Dounreay Castle near Thurso, Caithness was originally held by the Clan Sinclair but later passed the Mackay Lords Reay. It was still occupied in 1863 and now stands in the grounds of the Dounreay Nuclear Plant.
- Loch Stack Castle near Scourie, Sutherland was held by the Mackays of Reay.
- Melness House near Tongue was held by the Mackays from the 14th century. An older house later replaced by a mansion was the site of the Skirmish of Tongue.
- Scourie Castle in Scourie, Sutherland. Seat of the Mackay of Scoury branch of the clan. (See Hugh Mackay of Scourie). The property later went to the Earls and Dukes of Sutherland and the later Scourie House dates from 1864.
- Dun Ugadale or just Ugadale near to Campbeltown, Kintyre, Argyll was possibly held by the Mackays from the 14th century. The ruins of a dun and old house.

== Chiefs ==
- The current chief of Clan Mackay is Æneas Simon Mackay, 15th Lord Reay. Also Baron Mackay van Ophemert and Zennewijnen, of the Netherlands. Also Baronet of Strathnaver

== Tartans ==
Tartan image	Notes
This image meant to approximate 'ancient' dyes. This image approximates 'modern' dyes.	Clan Mackay ('Logan'), circa 1816.
	Barr-Colony Mackie tartan (Canada)
	Clanmorgan (MacKay) tartan, as published in 1842 in Vestiarium Scoticum

== See also ==
- Lord Reay
- Rockall - a clan claim to Rockall.
- Scottish clan
- The real McCoy
- Clan Morrison

== Bibliography ==
- Bower, Walter (1447). Scotichronicon.
- Buchanan, George (1827) [Printed from original latin manuscript of 1579]. History of Scotland. Vol. 2. Glasgow and Edinburgh: Archibald Fullarton and Blackie and Son. "Republished in 1827 in English by James Aikman"
- Coventry, Martin (2008). Castles of the Clans: The Strongholds and Seats of 750 Scottish Families and Clans. Goblinshead. ISBN 978-1-899874-36-1.
- Gordon, Sir Robert (1813) [Printed from original manuscript 1580 - 1656]. A Genealogical History of the Earldom of Sutherland. Edinburgh: A. Constable.
- Lynch, Michael, ed. (2011). Oxford Companion to Scottish History. Oxford University Press. ISBN 978-0-19-923482-0.
- Mackinnon, Donald (1957). The Clan Ross. Edinburgh: W. & A. K. Johnston & G. W. Bacon. ISBN 978-0-7179-4537-5.
- Mackay, Angus (1906). The Book of Mackay. 25 George IV Bridge, Edinburgh: Norman Macleod.
- Mackay, John of Rockfield (1836). Life of Lieut. General Hugh Mackay of Scoury. 19 Holles Street, London and, Edinburgh: Edward Bull, and Laing & Forbes, and Bell and Bradfute.
- Mackay, Robert (1829). History of the House and Clan of Mackay. 233 High Street, Edinburgh: Andrew Jack & Co.
- Paul, James Balfour (1903). An Ordinary of Arms Contained in the Public Register of all Arms and Bearings in Scotland (2nd ed.). Edinburgh: William Green & Sons.
- Pinkerton, John (1797). The History of Scotland. Vol. 1. The Poultry, London: Charles Dilly.
- Rose, D.M. (1897). Historical notes; or Essays on the '15 and '45. 26 Princes Street, Edinburgh: W. Brown.
- Simpson, Peter (1996). The Independent Highland Companies, 1603 - 1760. John Donald Publishers. ISBN 0-85976-432-X.
- Sinclair, Thomas (1890). The Gunns. Wick, W. Rae. OCLC 18925506.
- Way, George & Squire, Romily (1994). Collins Scottish Clan & Family Encyclopedia. (Foreword by The Rt Hon. The Earl of Elgin KT, Convenor, The Standing Council of Scottish Chiefs). Glasgow: HarperCollins.
