= Battle of Aldy Charrish =

Scottish clan battle that took place on 11 July 1487

Coordinates: 57°56′30″N 4°33′35″W

- Part of the Scottish clan wars
- Clan crest badges of Clan Mackay (left) and Clan Ross (right)
Date	11 July 1487, possibly 1486 or 1478
Location	Near Strathoykel, Sutherland grid reference NH4897
Result	Mackay/Sutherland victory

Belligerents
Clan Mackay; Clan Sutherland (according to one source)	Clan Ross

Commanders and leaders
John Mackay; Robert Sutherland †	Alexander Ross †

Strength
Unknown	According to Fraser (1674): 400 men

Casualties and losses
According to Fraser (1674): 150 Mackays and 6 Mackay gentlemen killed	According to Gordon (1630): "17 landed gentlemen and a great number of common soldiers" killed According to Fraser (1674): "70 gentlemen and a considerable number of common soldiers killed"

The Battle of Aldy Charrish (also known as the Battle of Auldicharish, Aldicharrish, Aldecharwis, Alt a'Charrais, Alt Charrais, Alt na Charrais) was a Scottish clan battle that took place on 11 July 1487. The Clan Mackay and possibly the Clan Sutherland defeated the Clan Ross and their allies in the Scottish Highlands, probably on the south side of Strathoykel.

== Background ==
The second half of the 15th century had seen a series of raids by the Mackays of Strathnaver on the Rosses of Balnagowan. According to the Blackcastle MS (which was written by Alexander Mackay of Blackcastle who had access to the Mackay chief's family charters and papers) the Rosses had made "a predatory incursion" into the territory of the Mackays. Sir Robert Gordon, however, says that the Mackays "often molested with incursions and invasions" the lands of the Rosses. According to historian Angus Mackay, the evidence is ample that the Mackays managed to recover some of the lands in Ross-shire that had belonged to their relatives and enemies, Neil Neilson Mackay, his brother Morgan Neilson Mackay, and Neil and Morgan's father-in-law Murray of Cubin, all three of whom had been defeated and killed by the Mackays of Strathnaver at the Battle of Drumnacoub in 1433. The evidence is also ample that the Rosses managed to secure some of these lands lying in the parishes of Edderton and Kincardine in Ross-shire. So it appears that the feud between the Mackays and the Rosses arose out of a scramble for disputed lands. Finally the Rosses, led by Alexander Ross of Balnagowan, gathered their forces to attack the invaders who were led by Angus Roy Mackay of Strathnaver and who they defeated and killed at the Battle of Tarbat, some time in the 1480s. Angus Roy Mackay's son John Mackay returned in the late 1480s to attack the Rosses in revenge for the death of his father.

According to 17th-century historian Sir Robert Gordon, who was a younger son of Alexander Gordon, 12th Earl of Sutherland, the Clan Sutherland joined the side of the Clan Mackay at this battle. However, 19th-century historian Angus Mackay disputes the Sutherland's presence at the battle stating that it would be unlikely that John Sutherland, 8th Earl of Sutherland at the time would have assisted against the Rosses as he was married to a daughter of the Ross chief of Balnagowan, and also that the feudal superiority of the Sutherlands over the Mackays "nowhere existed save in his own fertile imagination".

== Contemporary evidence ==
Contemporary evidence for the battle is found in The Calendar of Fearn which is a manuscript of the Clan Ross. It dates the conflict to 11 July 1487 and gives eleven names of those killed at Aldecharwis.

== Location and date ==
Most sources follow Gordon in giving the date of the battle as 11 July 1487. Gordon quotes this to The Calendar of Fearn. Some later sources have quoted The Calendar of Fearn as putting it in June 1486, but this is clearly a mistake as the Calendar clearly gives the year of 1487. Mackay dates the Battle of Tarbat to 1475 and "Allta-charrish" to 1478 or "a few years after".

The location of the battle remains elusive. Most sources say that it took place in Strathoykel or Strathcarron. Whilst some interpret the latter as the River Carron in Wester Ross, it is more likely to be the Carron in Sutherland, that lies immediately south of the Oykel. Mackinnon's map locates it on the banks of the lower Carron, between Braelangwell and Invercharron. The most probable location is the Allt a'Charraigh (grid reference NH4897), a burn between Braelangwell and Rosehall that flows into the Kilmachalmack Burn on the Strathoykel side of Meall Dheirgidh.

== Accounts of the battle ==
=== 17th century manuscripts ===
==== Sir Robert Gordon (1630) ====
Sir Robert Gordon, 1st Baronet's manuscript, A Genealogical History of the Earldom of Sutherland, was written in about 1630 and says the following for the battle:

In the dayes of this John Earle Southerland, the battell of Aldycharrish was foughtin, the eleventh day of Julie 1487, upon this occasion: Angus Macky (the sone of Neill Gald, or Neill-Wasse-Macky) being slain at Tarbat by the surname of Rosse, as I have shewen alreadie, John Reawigh Macky (the sone of this Angus) came to John Earle of Southerland, upon whom he depended, and desired, he sayd, to revenge his father's death: whereunto Earle John yeelded, and presentie sent his uncle, Robert Southerland, with a company of chosen men, to assist him. So Robert Southerland, John Reawigh Macky, and William-Dow-Mack -Ean-Abreigh, did invade Strath-oy-kell with fyre and sword, burnt, spoilled, and wasted many lands apperteyning to the Rosses. The laird of Balnagown, (then cheeff of the rosses in that shyre) heiring of this invasion, he gathered all the forces of the province of Rosse, and mett Robert Southerland and John Reawigh at a place called Aldy-charrish. Ther ensued a cruell battell, which continued a long space, with incredible obstinacie: the doubt of the victorie being no lesse great then wes desyre: much blood wes shed. In end, the inhabitants of Rosse, being unable to indure the enemies force, were untterly disbanded and put to flight. Alexander Rosse, laird of Balnagowne, wes ther slain, with seaventen other landed gentlemen of the province of Rosse, besyds a great number of commoun soldiers. The manuscript of Fearn nameth these among the principall gentlemen that wer slain: Alexander Rosse of Balnagown, Mr William Rosse, Alexander Terrall, Angus McCulloch of Terrell, William Rosse, Alexander Terrall, John Wasse, William Wase, John Mitchell, Thomas Wause, Hutcheon Waus.

==== James Fraser of Wardlaw (1674) ====
James Fraser of Wardlaw wrote the Wardlaw Manuscript in about 1674. It gives the year of 1438 for the events at Tarbat and 1479 for the Battle of Aldy Charrish. It states that 70 landed gentlemen were slain with Alexander Ross of Balnagowan as well as a considerable number of common soldiers. It also says that 150 Mackays were killed as well as 6 Mackay gentlemen. It quotes as sources the manuscripts of Fern and Beuly:

That year also happened to be fatall for a bloody conflict fell out at Altcharrish in Brea Rosse upon this occasion. Anguis Macky being slain at Tarbut, anno 1438, by the Rosses, as was reported, John Revach M'ky his sone came to the Earle of Sutherland, upon whom he depended, and desired his Lordships aid and concurrance to revenge his fathers death, to which the Earl of Sutherland as a bad neighbour, and a worse judge, yelds, and sent his own uncle, Robert Sutherland, with a company of men, along with John Revach to invade Rosse, they joining together, being furious and forward enugh, they fell upon Strathoikell and Strathcharron with fire and sword, burnt, plundered, and laid wast divers lands appertaining to the Rosses, the Laird of Ballnigown, cheefe of the Rosses, getting sudden advertisement of the attempt, a great losse, convocats all his fensible men, and at a randivous near Edderton, piled out 400 men, with quhom he marcht in person, and met Robert Sutherland and John Revach at a passe in Strathoickel called Altcharrish, and there ensued a dreadfull conflict which continued hot a full day with incredible currage and furry and much blood on both sids. In end the Rosses were worsted and put to flight. Alexander Ross, Laird of Ballnigown, was there slaine, with 70 other landed gentlemen of his name, besids a considerable number of commone soldiers: also Robert Sutherland fell in that field and merito qho came theire to court his death. John Revach Macky escaped alive, and dyed soon after of his wounds. The manuscripts of Fern and Beuly nameth those following, 150 Mackyes and 6 genlemen of that name, Mr. William Ross, Anguis Mackulloch of Tarrall, John Vaus of Lochslin, Thomas Vaus, John Mickle Fern, Alexander Denune, Pitogarty, John Denus his uncle. This bloody day at Altcharish, where the Mackyes gaind so litle that they came not again to Ross for vassalage.

=== 18th, 19th and 20th century publications ===
==== Conflicts of the Clans (1764) ====
An account of the battle was recorded in the book Conflicts of the Clans, published by the Foulis press in 1764 and which was written from Sir Robert Gordon's 17th century manuscript, A Genealogical History of the Earldom of Sutherland:

The year of God 1487, this conflict was fought; upon this occasion Angus Mackay being slain at Tarbat by the surname of Ross, as I have shown already, John Riabhach Mackay (the son of this Angus), came to the Earl of Sutherland, upon whom he then depended, and desired his aid to revenge his father's death, whereupon the Earl of Sutherland yields, and sent his uncle, Robert Sutherland, with a company of men, to assist him. Thereupon Robert Sutherland and John Riabhach Mackay did invade Strathoyckel and Strathcarron with fire and sword; burnt, spoiled, and laid waste divers lands appertaining to the Rosses. The Laird of Balnagown (then chief of the Rosses in that shire) learning of his invasion, gathered all the forces of Ross and met Robert Sutherland and John Riabhach at a place called Aldicharrish. There ensued a cruel and furious conflict combat, which continued a long time, with incredible obstinacy; much blood was shed on either side. In the end, the inhabitants of Ross being unable to endure or resist the enemies' forces were utterly disbanded and put to flight. Alexander Ross, Laird of Balnagown, was slain with seventeen other landed gentlemen of the province of Ross, besides a great number of common soldiers. The manuscript of Fearn (by and attour Balnagown) names these following among those that were slain: Mr. William Ross, Angus Macculloch of Terrell, John Waus, William Waus, John Mitchell, Thomas Waus, Houcheon Waus.

==== Robert Mackay (1829) ====
Robert Mackay wrote an account of the battle in his book the History of the House and Clan of the Name Mackay (1829), quoting from the historian Sir Robert Gordon (1580 - 1656):

John Mackay, some time after he had succeeded to his father's lands, resolved to revenge his death; for which purpose, having assembled his men, and put half of them under command of William-Dow Mackay, son of John-Abrach; and being also accompanied by the men of Assint, and such friends as he had in Sutherland, he invaded Strathoikel in Ross with fire and sword, burnt, wasted and spoiled all the lands belongingto all of the name Ross and their allies. Ross of Balnagown immediately raised all of the power of the county to oppose the invaders, upon which a most severe conflict ensued, and for a considerable time it appeared doubtful which party would have the victory. At length, however, the Ross-men, after great slaughter was made among them, gave way, and fled. Ross of Balnagown, and seventeen other proprietors of land in Ross were slain, together with an immense number of their followers. "The manuscript of Fern" says Sir Robert Gordon "contains the following names of the principle persons who were killed, Alexander Tarrell, William Ross, John Waus, William Waus, John Mitchell, Thomas Waus, and Hugh Waus. A great spoil of cattle was driven off, and divided among the victors in the customary manner. Sir Robert states that the Assint-men insisted that the men of Sutherland should receive no share of the spoil, but that William-Dow, who detected such injustice, said, that he should be an enemy to any who would act such a fraudulent and base part. This conflict happened at a place called Auldicharish.

==== Donald MacKinnon (1957) ====
Donald MacKinnon wrote an account in his book The Clan Ross (1957), again quoting from the historian Sir Robert Gordon (1580 – 1656):

The Mackays did not forget this wicked deed, and five years later invaded Ross to avenge the death of their chief. Alexander Ross of Balnagown hurriedly called together the “gentlemen” of his clan and their men, and met the invaders at a place called Alt a’Charrais in Strathcarron. There a fierce battle was fought, and the Rosses were disastrously defeated. Sir Robert Gordon, alluding to this sanguinary fight says: “Much blood was shed…. The inhabitants of Ross, being unable to endure the enemy’s forces, were disbanded and put to flight. Alexander Ross, laird of Balnagown, was there slain, with seventeen other landed gentlemen of the Province of Ross, besides a great number of common soldiers”. Among the “gentlemen of the Province of Ross”, who fell along with their chief, were Angus MacCulloch of Tarell, Alexander Tarell, William Ross of Little Allan, John Vass, Thomas Vass, Hugh Vass, John Mitchell and William Ross, whose designation is not given.

== Aftermath ==
In 1490, James IV of Scotland granted to David Ross, nephew and heir of John Ross, and grandson of John Ross of Balnagown, the lands of Strathoikel and Strathcarron, which had formerly belonged to Morgan Neilson Mackay, who along with his brother Neil Neilson Mackay, had attempted in 1433 to take over the lands of Strathnaver from their cousin, Angus Du Mackay, 7th of Strathnaver, but had been defeated and killed at the Battle of Drumnacoub by Angus's forces. Although John Rivach Mackay received a remission from the king in 1494, the blood feud with the Rosses appears to have continued as David Ross of Balnagown and Iye Roy Mackay of Strathnaver were summoned to appear before the Earl of Argyll who was the Lord High Chancellor of Scotland. On 4 October 1496, each of them were bound by extending their hand to Argyll in the king's name to keep the peace towards each other and that their "folks sal be harmless and skaithles", under the penalty of 500 merks if they failed. Notwithstanding the apparent reconciliation, David Ross of Balnagown and his brother Hucheon Ross, brought an action to the Lords of Council against the Mackays for spoils taken from their lands eight years earlier. On 15 March 1504, Iye Roy Mackay, 10th of Strathnaver secured from the king the lands of Ferencostrig, Strathhalladale, Creichmore, Assent, Coigach, Gruids, and Strathfleet. On 15 February 1506, Iye Roy Mackay caused the charter that had been granted by Donald of Islay, Lord of the Isles in 1415 to the Mackays who laid claim to these lands. However, the Lords of Council decided that the lands had belonged to Euphemia II, Countess of Ross. The Mackays continued to raid the Rosses well into the 16th century and did not stop until they became caught up in quarrels with their neighbours, the powerful Clan Sutherland.
