= Dun Ugadale =

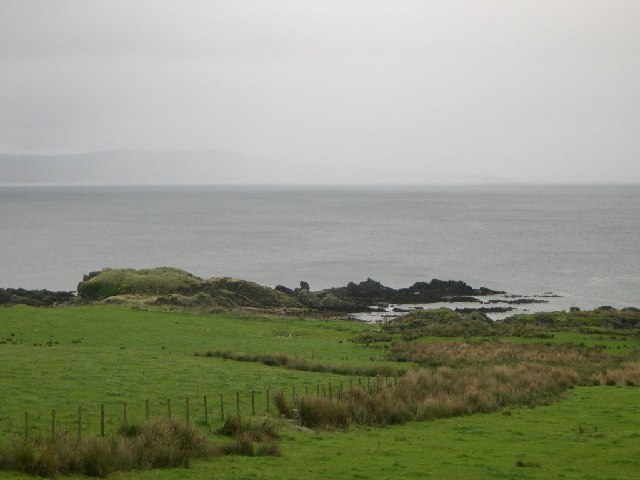
Site of dun on Ugadale Point, Kintyre

Dun Ugadale, (English: Fort of the valley of the owl) is an Iron Age fort on a promontory near Ugadale, Kintyre, Scotland. It was owned by the MacKay's from the 14th century and was passed through marriage in the 17th century to the MacNiel's.

The Ugadale brooch was allegedly given to the Mackays by Robert the Bruce near Crois Mhic Aoidh (Mackay's Cross), Arnicle after transporting Robert to Arran.
