= Battle of Garbharry =

1555 battle in Scotland

- Part of the Scottish clan wars
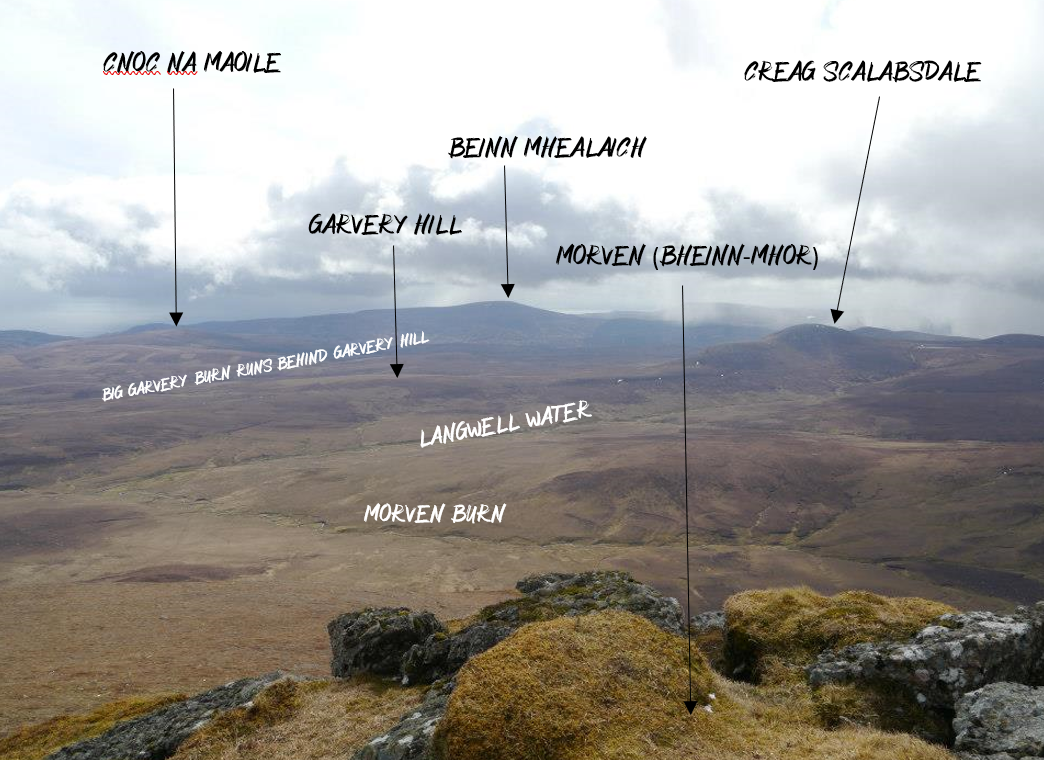
- Approximate location of the battle, looking south, taken from the peak of Morven (Anglicised from 'A' Mhòr Bheinn', also referred to as ''Bheinn Mòr" by Robert Gordon. It essentially just means 'The Big Hill'). 'Garvery' is an Anglicisation of 'Garbharry', the name of the hill and burn(s) just to the south of Morven.
Date	1555
Location	Foot of the mountain Beinn-mhor, in Berriedale, Scotland
Result	Sutherland victory

Belligerents
Clan Sutherland	Clan Mackay

Commanders and leaders
MacJames; James MacWilliam	John More Mackay

Casualties and losses
	120 killed

The Battle of Garbharry was a Scottish clan battle fought in the year 1555. It was the last battle to be fought between the Clan Mackay and Clan Sutherland. It was fought "beside the water of Garbharry", at "the foot of the hill called Beinn-mhor, in Berriedale". This has been recognised as the area around Garvery Hill, including Big and Little Garvery Burn, just south of Morven (the Anglicised name from A' Mhòr Beinn / Beinn-Mhòr, meaning 'The Big Hill''), where presumably some of the soldiers drowned.

== Background ==
In 1555, John Gordon, 11th Earl of Sutherland was commissioned by the Queen Regent, Mary of Guise to punish Iye MacKay, chief of the Clan Mackay for his failure to attend her in Inverness. The Earl destroyed the Mackay's main stronghold on the north coast, Borve Castle north of Farr, which the Clan Mackay had used to carry out raids on the Clan Sutherland. The Earl of Sutherland confronted Iye Mackay in Strathbrora, forcing him to surrender himself to imprisonment in Edinburgh. Iye Mackay's first cousin John-More Mackay then assumed power. He led a raid towards Helmsdale in Sutherland, and burnt the chapel of St. Ninian's at Navidale just north of Helmsdale before pulling back.

The Clan Sutherland then assembled a force under MacJames, the Terell of the Doil and James MacWilliam and set off in pursuit. They caught up with the Mackays in Berriedale, near Garbharry where the battle took place.

== Battle ==
According to the account given in Conflicts of the Clans, the Sutherlands overtook the Mackay of Strathnaver men at the foot of the hill called Beinn-mhor, in Berriedale, and invaded them beside the water of Garbharry, where then ensued a cruel conflict, fought with great obstinacy. The Strathnaver men were overthrown and chased; about 120 of them were slain, and some drowned in Garbharry.

== Aftermath ==
The Battle of Garbharry is cited as being the last battle fought between the Clan Mackay and Clan Sutherland. It would appear that this is the case as far as the chief of Mackays, who was designated as "of Strathnaver" is concerned, although 35 years later a half-brother of Mackay of Strathnaver fought against the Earl of Sutherland at the Battle of Clynetradwell.
