= Battle of Tannach =

15th-century Scottish clan battle

Coordinates: 58°24′42″N 3°8′46″W

- Part of the Scottish clan wars
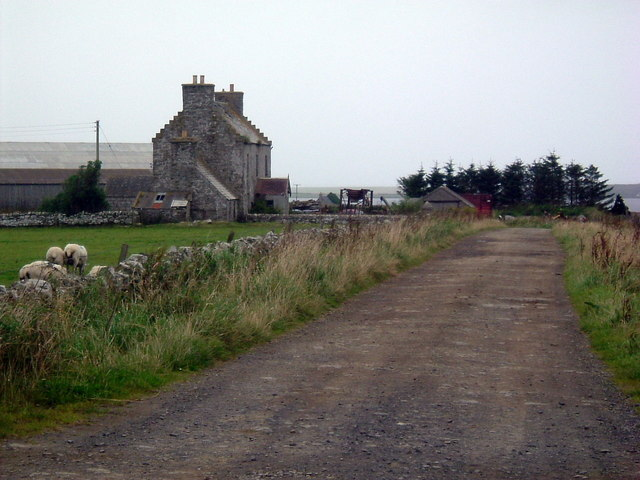
- Tannach House in modern times
Date	1464 or 1438
Location	Tannach Moor, SW of Wick grid reference ND330475
Result	Mackay/Keith victory

Belligerents
Clan Keith; Clan Mackay	Clan Gunn

Commanders and leaders
Angus Roy	Unknown

Strength
Unknown	Unknown

Casualties and losses
Unknown	Unknown

The Battle of Tannach (Blare Tannie or Blar-Tannie, Scottish Gaelic: Tannach Moor) was a Scottish clan battle fought about 3 miles (4.8 km) southwest of Wick, in the far north of Scotland. It was fought between men of the Clan Keith and Clan Mackay from Strathnaver against men of the Clan Gunn and possibly their allies the Clan Oliphant and Clan Sutherland from Caithness. The date is uncertain, it was probably in 1464 but may have been in 1438.

== Background ==
The cause of the battle seems to have been a claim made by one of the Oliphants, then allies of the Sutherlands of Duffus, to some lands held by the Keiths. The lands were later granted to the Oliphants by King James IV. Also, the Keiths requiring the assistance of the Mackays indicates that they were opposed by a powerful force.

== Accounts of the Battle ==
=== Sir Robert Gordon ===
Sir Robert Gordon (1580–1656) wrote an account of the battle in his book the Genealogical History of the Earldom of Sutherland:

About the year 1464, some serious disputes had arisen between Keith of Ackergill and the Guns and other inhabitants of Caithness. The Keiths, mistrusting their own forces, they sent to Angus Mackay (the son of Niel-Wasse) intreating him to come to their aid; whereunto he easily conescended. Then did the inhabitants of Caithness convene in all haste, and met the Strathnaver men and the Keiths, at a place in Caithness called Blare Tannie, i.e The Moor of Tanach. There ensued a cruel fight, with great slaughter on either side. In the end the Keiths had the victory, by the means chiefly of John-More-MacK-Ean-Reawich, who is very famous in these countries for his valour and manhood shewn at this conflict.

=== Conflicts of the Clans ===
Another account of the battle was written in the book Conflicts of the Clans first published by the Foulis Press in 1764, written from a manuscript from the time of King James VI of Scotland (1566 - 1625): In this account battle is dated as taking place in 1438:

About the year of God 1438, there fell some variance betwixt the Keiths and some others of the inhabitants of Caithness. The Keiths, mistrusting their own forces, sent to Angus Mackay of Strathnaver (the son of Neil Wasse), entreating him to come to their aid, whereunto he easily yielded; so Angus Mackay, accompanied with John Mor MacIan-Riabhaich, went into Caithness with a band of men, and invaded that country. Then did the inhabitants of Caithness assemble in all haste, and met the Strathnaver men and the Keiths at a place in Caithness called Blair-tannie. There ensued a cruel fight, with slaughter on either side. In the end the Keiths had the victory, by means chiefly of John Mor MacIan-Riabhaich (an Assynt man), who was very famous in these countries for his manhood shown at this conflict. Two chieftains and leaders of the inhabitants of Caithness were slain, with divers others. This Angus Mackay, here mentioned, was afterward burnt and killed in the Church of Tarbat, by a man of the surname of Ross, whom he had often molested with incursions and invasions.
