= Angus Mackay, 6th of Strathnaver =

Scottish clan chief (d. 1403)

Angus Mackay, 6th of Strathnaver (died 1403) was the sixth chief of the ancient Clan Mackay, a Scottish clan of the Scottish Highlands.

== Early life ==
Angus Mackay, 6th of Strathnaver, was the eldest son of Donald Mackay, 5th of Strathnaver. However, Donald was killed along with his own father, Iye Mackay, 4th of Strathnaver, at Dingwall Castle in 1370 during a feud with William, 5th Earl of Sutherland. So in reality, Angus Mackay succeeded his grandfather Iye. According to early 19th-century historian Robert Mackay, the Earl of Sutherland was also killed in 1370 at the hands of the avenging Mackays.

According to early 20th-century historian Angus Mackay, during the chieftaincy of Angus Mackay, 6th of Strathnaver, men of the Clan Mackay (“Clan Morgan”) supported Duncan Stewart, son of the Earl of Buchan when he invaded the Braes of Angus in 1391.

== Family ==
Angus Mackay, 6th of Strathnaver, married a daughter of Torquil MacLeod, chief of the Clan MacLeod of Lewis and had the following two sons:

1. Angus Du Mackay, 7th of Strathnaver, who succeeded his father as chief of the Clan Mackay.
2. Rorie Gald Mackay, also known as Rorie the Islander having been fostered by his maternal relatives on the Isle of Lewis. He was killed at the Battle of Dingwall in 1411, fighting in support of his brother Angus and against Donald of Islay, Lord of the Isles.

== See also ==
- Chiefs of Clan Mackay
- Clan Mackay
- Scottish clan
