= Iye Du Mackay, 12th of Strathnaver =

Iye Du Mackay (Iye Mackay), 12th of Strathnaver, was the chief of the Clan Mackay, a Highland Scottish clan, from 1550 to 1572.

== Early life ==
Iye Du Mackay was the eldest son of Donald Mackay, 11th of Strathnaver, chief of Clan Mackay, and Helen Sinclair, daughter of Alexander Sinclair of Stempster, who was in turn the second son of William Sinclair, 2nd Earl of Caithness and chief of the Clan Sinclair. Iye Du Mackay succeeded his father Donald, who died towards the end of 1550.

== Military career ==
Iye Du Mackay was taken prisoner by the English for having taken part in the Battle of Solway Moss in 1542. However, King Henry VIII was keen on a union between Scotland and England, by marrying his son Prince Edward to the infant Mary, Queen of Scots. He treated the Scottish prisoners well and allowed them to return to Scotland without the usual ransom, on the condition that they supported his proposal, and if they did not support his proposal, they would return to England on parole.

In 1544 Iye Du Mackay and nineteen of his followers took part in the Battle of Glasgow. The Earl of Arran had been made Governor of Scotland but the earls of Glencairn, Angus and Lennox had formed a strong alliance which attacked Arran in 1544 at Glasgow Muir, but were defeated by Arran with considerable loss. A letter of remission was granted to Mackay and nineteen of his followers. Mackay then returned to England, where he remained in the military service of the English for three years.

It is certain that Mackay took part in the Siege of Haddington in 1548. 17th-century historian Sir Robert Gordon writes of Iye Du Mackay: "served divers tymes in wars upon the borders, against the English: in which service he behaved himself valiantly". However, 19th-century historian Angus Mackay states that records show that Iye Du Mackay actually fought for the English and not against them.

Upon the death of his father Donald, Iye Du Mackay returned to Strathnaver to secure the estates, but for twenty years he had to fight against the combined power of George Gordon, 4th Earl of Huntly and John Gordon, 11th Earl of Sutherland, as he could get no legal title to his father's lands. In 1551 a Parliament took place in which both the Earl of Huntly and the Earl of Sutherland had their first innings against Iye Du Mackay, who had already made himself obnoxious to the party of Mary of Guise. In 1552 Mary of Guise held a court at Inverness and invited Mackay, John MacDonald of Moidart and the Earl of Caithness, but all refused to appear. According to historian Angus Mackay, Iye Du Mackay knew that attending would mean being clapped in irons and so wisely stayed at home. In September 1553 a complaint was made to the Privy Council and Mackay and the Earl of Caithness were again summoned to Inverness to appear before the Earl of Huntly who was “Lieutenant General of these parts". The Earl of Huntly failed to capture John of Moidart, and was put in prison by his opponents.

The Earl of Sutherland was empowered by Mary of Guise to apprehend Mackay and laid siege to him in Borve Castle. The Earl of Sutherland was joined by Hugh Kennedy of Girvanmains who set sail from Leith in a hired ship called the Lion that was armed with cannon from Edinburgh Castle. Iye Du Mackay, finding himself besieged by cannon both from land and sea, slipped away, leaving his cousin, Rory mac-Ean mor Mackay, in charge of the castle. Borve Castle was ultimately broken and Iye Du Mackay was later captured and imprisoned in Dumbarton Castle from 1 February to 20 October 1555. 17th-century historian Sir Robert Gordon states that in Iye Du's absence his cousin, John Mor Mackay, entered into and spoiled Sutherland with the "best and most resolute" men of Strathnaver but were defeated at the Battle of Garbharry by the Clan Sutherland.

On 5 October 1562 Mary, Queen of Scots granted full remission to Iye Du Mackay for having supported the English at Haddington in 1548. On 28 October 1562 the Clan Mackay were amongst those who defeated the Earl of Huntly at the Battle of Corrichie. Huntly was killed in battle and his son, Sir John Gordon, was captured and later executed in Aberdeen. At the parliament held on 28 May 1563, the Earl of Sutherland, who had fled the country, was also condemned to death. This sentence was reduced four years later, when he was allowed to return to Scotland.

== Disputed lands ==
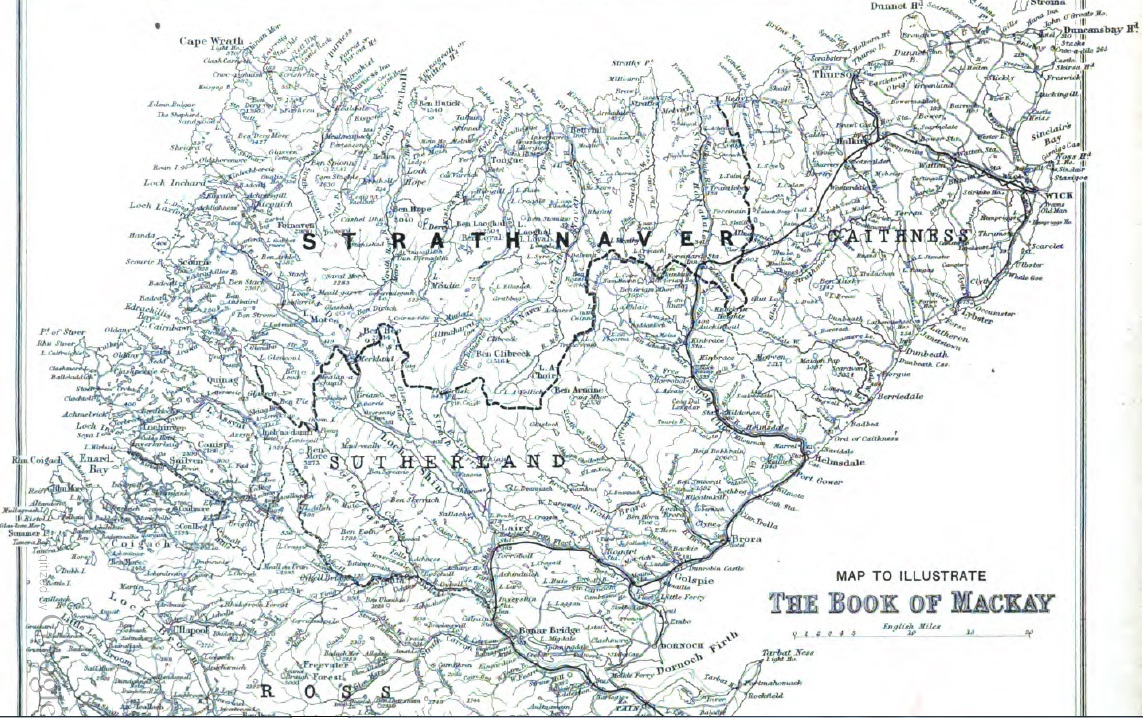
Map showing the territory of the Clan Mackay that was known as Strathnaver in relation to Sutherland and Caithness. The boundary is marked with a dashed line. (click to enlarge)

On 19 April 1567, Parliament ratified the gift from the queen to the newly restored George Gordon, 5th Earl of Huntly, Mackay's lands of Strathnaver. Huntly later passed ownership of the lands to his cousin, the Earl of Sutherland. It was claimed that Mackay's father, Donald, was a bastard, and he was consequently barred by law from inheriting his father's estates. Bastard or not, Donald Mackay had held the lands by a charter under the Great Seal that had been granted to him by James V. Finally on 29 July 1570 an agreement was made between Huntly, Sutherland and Mackay in which Huntly would alienate the Strathnaver lands to Mackay for 3000 merks but would keep the feudal superiority. Huntly later disponed the superiority over to the Earl of Sutherland. However, by 20 April 1571 Mackay had sasine of the lands of Strathnaver by charter.

== Later feuds ==
During the years 1570 – 1571 the Gordon Earl of Huntly with the assistance of his cousin, the Gordon Earl of Sutherland assailed the Clan Forbes in Aberdeen with much success. However, in the meantime Mackay and the Earl of Caithness swept into Sutherland taking and occupying Dunrobin Castle with many of the Earl of Sutherland's followers failing to oppose them: Murray of Aberscross fled to Strathbogie (Huntly), Gordon of Drummuie to Orkney and Gray of Skibo Castle to St Andrews.

== Family ==
Iye Du Mackay died in November 1572. He had married firstly his cousin Helen, daughter of Hugh MacLeod of Assint. However, as he and his wife were first cousins, their children would be barred by canon law from succeeding their father. They had two sons:

1. Donald Balloch Mackay (Progenitor of the Mackay of Scoury branch of the clan). He fought at the Battle of Clynetradwell in 1590 and was the ancestor of the famous General Hugh Mackay of Scoury.
2. John Beg Mackay. (Killed in a skirmish in 1579 at Balnakeil, parish of Durness).

Iye Du Mackay married, secondly, Christian, daughter of John Sinclair of Duns, Caithness. They had two sons and three daughters:

1. Huistean Du Mackay, 13th of Strathnaver, who succeeded his father.
2. William Mackay, 1st of Bighouse. (Progenitor of the Mackay of Bighouse branch of the clan).
3. Eleanor Mackay, who married Donald Bane MacLeod of Assint.
4. Jane Mackay, who married Alexander Sutherland of Berriedale.
5. Barbara Mackay, who married Alexander Macdavid, chieftain of the Clan Gunn.

== See also ==
- Chiefs of Clan Mackay
- Clan Mackay
- Earl of Huntly
- Clan Gordon
- Earl of Sutherland
- Clan Sutherland
- Earl of Caithness
- Clan Sinclair

== Bibliography ==
- Gordon, Robert (1813) [Printed from original manuscript 1580 – 1656]. A Genealogical History of the Earldom of Sutherland. Edinburgh: Printed by George Ramsay and Co. for Archibald Constable and Company Edinburgh; and White, Cochrance and Co. London.
- Mackay, Angus (1906). The Book of Mackay. 25 George IV Bridge, Edinburgh: Norman MacLeod.
