= Donald Mackay, 11th of Strathnaver =

Scottish noble (died 1550)

Donald Mackay, 11th of Strathnaver (died 1550), was the eleventh chief of the ancient Clan Mackay, a Scottish clan of the Scottish Highlands.

== Early life ==
Donald Mackay was the second eldest son of Iye Roy Mackay, 10th of Strathnaver, and his wife who was the daughter of Norman, son of Patrick O'Beolan of Carloway, Lewis. Donald's elder brother, John Mackay, 11th of Strathnaver, died in 1529 without legitimate male issue and therefore Donald was able to succeed him as chief of the Clan Mackay.

== Alliance with the Clan Forbes and Clan Campbell ==
In around 1529 Donald Mackay of Strathnaver assisted the Master of Forbes (of Clan Forbes) and Sir John Campbell of Cawdor during a feud in which Alexander Seaton of Meldrum was killed. Historian Angus Mackay states that it is with interest that at this time the Mackays and Forbeses who claim to have sprung from the same kindred stock in the distant past, are found acting in concert. It was probably for the death of Seaton of Meldrum that Mackay obtained a pardon for himself and his Strathnaver clansmen dated 26 July 1536. In July 1537, the Master of Forbes and his sister-in-law, Janet Douglas, Lady Glamis, sister of Douglas, Earl of Angus, were both executed for conspiring against the king. Associated with Lady Glamis was one Alexander Makay who was sentenced to be banished from all parts of Scotland except for the county of Aberdeen. Sir John Campbell of Cawdor, brother of the Earl of Argyll, who had been associated with the Mackays and Forbeses in the killing of Seaton, also killed Maclean of Duart (chief of Clan Maclean) in bed in about 1529. Maclean had left his wife, Lady Elizabeth Campbell, exposed to certain death on a lonely sea-girt isle. The killing of Maclean resulted in a prolonged feud between the Macleans and the Campbells in which the Mackays of Kintyre suffered severely at the hands of the Macleans and it appears that the Mackays supported the Campbells during the feud.

== Meeting with James V of Scotland ==
In May 1539, King James V, sailing from Leith around the north of Scotland, calling at Orkney and arriving on the Strathnaver coast, Donald Mackay of Strathnaver went on board to accompany the king on the rest of the voyage. The king also took other chiefs on board such as Roderick Macleod of the Lewes, Alexander Macleod of Dunvegan, John of Moidart, Alexander of Glengarry, Mackenzie of Kintail, Maclean of Duart and MacConnal of Isla. Some of these chiefs were received on board as enemies and imprisoned, while others as friends were rewarded. Donald Mackay was treated well by the king for on the 16 December 1539, after they arrived at Stirling, Mackay obtained a charter under the Great Seal of Scotland for his ancestral lands in heritage: Farr, Armadale, Straye, Rynewe, Kynnald, Golspie, Dirlot, Cattack, Broynach, Kilchalumkill in Strabroa, Davach Lochnaver, Davach Eriboll, the two pennylands of Stromay, the mill of Kinald, the island of Sanday extending to the three pennylands, the lands of Melness and Hope, with the mills, mill-lands, manors etc., formerly belonging to Y Mckay and his ancestors, the father of the said Donald, but in the king's hands by reason of nonentry, and now erected into the free barony of Farr, sasine to be taken at the principal messuage of Farr. Donald Mackay took sasine by procurators of the lands at the castle of Farr, which was located between Farr and Swordly, on 16 April 1540.

Donald Mackay appears to have remained at court for at least twelve months as on 26 November 1540 he witnessed a charter of lands in Monteith of Perth to Anthony Balfour of Torre Estir. While at court, Donald Mackay also received a charter from Andrew Stuart, Bishop of Caithness for the church-lands in Durness, Strathnaver to himself and his heirs after him.

== Feud with Sutherland of Duffus ==
Due to the part Donald Mackay had played with Forbes against the Seatons, William Sutherland, 7th of Duffus consequently secured the nonentry of Mackay's lands in 1530 in an evident attempt to get possession of Mackay's lands of Strathnaver, similar to that that had been done by Sutherland of Dirlot at an earlier period. Some differences arose between Donald Mackay and Sutherland of Duffus over the lands of Kerrownashein, near Lochnaver, which Duffus claimed to hold from the church of Moray in virtue of a grant from Reginald Cheyne, and also as to the nonentry dues of Mackay's estate since 1530. In 1542 the matter was submitted to the arbitration of James Stewart, Earl of Moray. The Earl of Moray decided that Sutherland of Duffus should alienate to Donald Mackay and his heirs the lands which he had held from the church of Moray.

== Battle of Solway Moss ==
Towards the end of 1542, the king of Scotland resolved upon a war with England. Donald Mackay of Strathnaver and his son Iye Du Mackay were summoned to muster at Lauder along with their clansmen. The disorderly Scottish army that set out for England under Oliver Sinclair was completely routed at the Battle of Solway Moss. Donald Mackay returned to Edinburgh with the king, but his son Iye Du Mackay was taken prisoner. The king died soon afterwards leaving an only child, Mary, Queen of Scots. At the instigation of the English king, Iye Du Mackay and some of the other Scottish prisoners promoted a scheme in which the infant Mary, Queen of Scots would be married to the king of England's son, the Prince of Wales.

== Battle of Alltan-Beath ==
According to 17th-century historian Sir Robert Gordon, 1st Baronet, who was a son of Alexander Gordon, 12th Earl of Sutherland, in 1542, Donald Mackay of Strathnaver invaded Sutherland with a company of men and burnt the village of Knockartel and took goods from Strathbrory in Sutherland. The book Conflicts of the Clans describes the Battle of Alltan-Beath in which the Mackays were subsequently defeated by the Gordons of Sutherland, although this battle is not specifically mentioned by either the Mackay historians or in the 1813 publication of Sir Robert Gordon's manuscript. According to Sir Robert Gordon, Donald Mackay was ultimately brought to the Gordon Earls of Huntly and Sutherland and upon his submission was, at their command, imprisoned in Foulis Castle. However, this version of events is disputed by historian Angus Mackay. Historian Angus Mackay explains that Robert Stuart, Bishop of Caithness, supporting the scheme of the English king for his son to marry the infant Mary, Queen of Scots as mentioned above, departed for England to join his brother the Earl of Lennox, and that the bishop made some arrangements with his relatives, including Mackay, for the protection of his castles and church-lands. As such Donald Mackay advanced into Sutherland and placed a party of his clansman in the bishop's Skibo Castle under the command of Neil Mackay of the Mackay of Aberach branch of the clan. On 28 April 1549, the bishop brought together at Castle Sinclair Girnigoe, all on equal terms, the Earls of Sutherland, Caithness and Donald Mackay, and they entered into a bond of friendship. Historian Angus Mackay states that this is an honest account of what had happened based on documents found at Dunrobin Castle and that Sir Robert Gordon has described it with his "usual untruthfulness".

== Feud with the Rosses ==
It is evident that the Mackays once more raided the Rosses of Balnagown as a record dated 28 June 1550 shows that Donald Mackay and other relatives were charged with the "cruel slaughter of Alexander MacAne Ross" and other relatives, and that Alexander Ross of Balnagown was "amerciated" for not reporting and delivering to the clerks of justicary the letters which had been purchased by the wives, children, parents, and friends of the deceased duly "executed and endorsed".

== Family ==
Donald Mackay, 11th of Strathnaver, married Helen, daughter of Alexander Sinclair of Stempster, second son of William Sinclair, 2nd Earl of Caithness and chief of Clan Sinclair. Donald Mackay and Helen Sinclair had the following children:

1. Iye Du Mackay, 12th of Strathnaver, heir and successor as chief of the Clan Mackay.
2. A daughter, who married John Mackay, 4th chieftain of the Mackay of Aberach branch of the clan.
3. Florence Mackay, who married Neil MacLeod of Assynt.

Donald Mackay, 11th of Strathnaver died towards the end of 1550.

== See also ==
- Chiefs of Clan Mackay
- Clan Mackay
- Earl of Sutherland
- Earl of Caithness
