= Barbara Mackay =

Scottish poet

- Born: c. 1615; Scourie
- Died: c. 1690 (aged 74–75)
- Occupations: Poet; Historian

Barbara MacKay, Lady Reay (c. 1615 – c. 1690) was a Scottish poet born in Scourie. Her main collection of poems is a manuscript composed of ten mainly religious poems dedicated to the Countess of Caithness. She also wrote on political matters: some of her best known works is a poem called Anagramme on his Ma[jes]ty, intend to encourage Charles II to be a good king, and a eulogy to Lord Lovat. She was the daughter of Ann Corbett of Arkboll, and Hugh MacKay of Scourie and the second wife of John MacKay, 2nd Lord Reay, with whom she had at least six children. Like her father and husband, Barbara MacKay was both a Royalist and a Presbyterian. Reverend James Fraser mentions that she was "admired for sharpness and eloquence [...] a great historian, a smart poet, and, for virtue and housekeeping, few or none her parallel".
