= Battle of Harpsdale =

Scottish clan battle fought in 1426 at Achardale, about 8 miles south of Thurso

Coordinates: 58°29′N 3°31′W

- Part of the Scottish clan wars
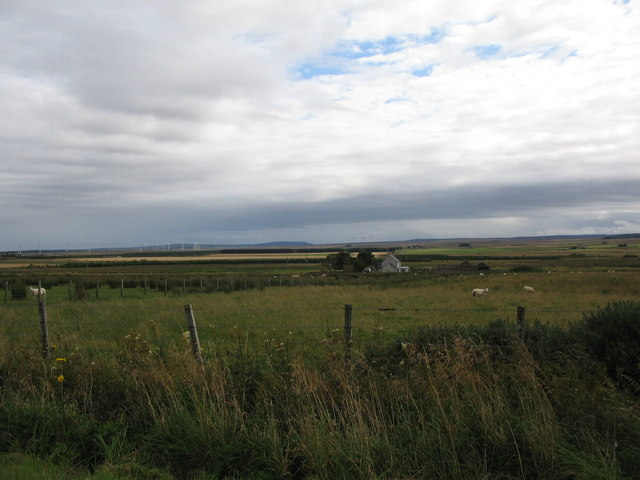
- Harpsdale in modern times
Date	1426
Location	Harpsdale, south of Halkirk, Caithness grid reference ND114561
Result	Inconclusive.

Belligerents
Clan Mackay	Clan Gunn

Commanders and leaders
Angus Mackay	Unknown

Strength
Unknown	Unknown

Casualties and losses
High	High

The Battle of Harpsdale (Battle of Achardale, Battle of Harpasdal) was a Scottish clan battle fought in 1426 at Achardale, about 8 miles (13 km) south of Thurso. The Clan Mackay had invaded Caithness from the west and Harpsdale was where the local Clan Gunn chose to make a stand. Despite great slaughter on both sides, the battle appears to have been inconclusive.

== Battle ==
Sir Robert Gordon (1580–1656) wrote an account of the battle in his book, the Genealogical History of the Earldom of Sutherland:

In the days of Robert, Earl of Sutherland, the year 1426, Angus-Dow Mackay, and his son Niel, assembling all the forces of Strathnaver, they entered into Caithness with all hostility, and spoiled the same. The inhabitants of Caithness convened with all diligence, and fought against Angus-Dow Mackay at Harpsdale, where there was great slaughter on either side. The report hereof came to the ears of King James the First, who thereupon came north to Inverness, of intention to pursue Angus-Dow Mackay. Hearing of the king's being at Inverness, he came and submitted himself to the king's mercy, and gave his son Niel in pledge for his good obedience from thenceforward: which submission the king accepted, and sent Niel Mackay to remain in captivity on the Bass Rock who from thenceforth was always called Niel-Bass Mackay.

== Aftermath ==
In the aftermath of this and several other battles, King James I of Scotland assembled a Parliament at Inverness in spring 1427 to restore order in the Highlands. Many Highland chiefs were arrested and punished including Alexander MacDonald, Lord of the Isles and his mother Mary or Mariota, Countess of Ross.

After the battle, when he heard that the King was at Inverness, Angus Du Mackay came and submitted himself to the King's mercy and gave his 14-year-old son Neil in pledge of his obedience in time coming. The King accepted and sent Neil Mackay to remain in captivity on the Bass Rock in the Firth of Forth. Afterwards he was called Neil Wasse Mackay. Angus Dow Mackay, who was called the "leader of 4000 Mackays" of Strathnavern was arrested as well as Kenneth More, John Ross, William Leslie, Angus Murray and Macmaken, each of them also a chief of 2,000. Two men were tried, condemned, and beheaded. One of them, who had murdered the late Lord of the Isles (though he contended he did so on orders of James I), was also executed in impartial justice. The others were scattered as prisoners in different castles. Some were condemned to death and some were restored to liberty.
