= Battle of Tarbat =

Scottish clan battle fought in the 1480s on the Tarbat peninsula, in Easter Ross

Coordinates: 57°50′N 3°49′W

- Part of the Scottish clan wars
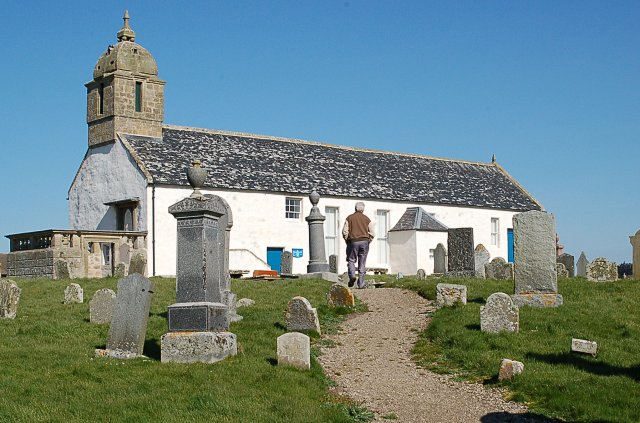
- Tarbat Old Church, Portmahomack, rebuilt in 1756
Date	1480s (1486?)
Location	Tarbat peninsula, Easter Ross grid reference NH914840
Result	Ross victory

Belligerents
Clan Ross	Clan Mackay

Commanders and leaders
Alexander Ross of Balnagown	Angus Roy Mackay, 9th of Strathnaver †

Strength
Unknown	Unknown

Casualties and losses
Unknown	No survivors?

The Battle of Tarbat was a Scottish clan battle fought in the 1480s on the Tarbat peninsula, in Easter Ross. The Clan Ross cornered a raiding party of Clan Mackay near the village of Portmahomack and put many of them to the sword. The survivors sought sanctuary in the nearby church but the Rosses set fire to it, killing all inside. The Mackays took revenge for this outrage in the subsequent Battle of Aldy Charrish.

== Background ==
The second half of the 15th century had seen a series of raids by the Mackays of Strathnaver on the Rosses of Balnagown. According to the Blackcastle MS (which was written by Alexander Mackay of Blackcastle who had access to the Mackay chief's family charters and papers) the Rosses had made "a predatory incursion" into the territory of the Mackays. Sir Robert Gordon, however, says that the Mackays "often molested with incursions and invasions" the lands of the Rosses. According to historian Angus Mackay, the evidence is ample that the Mackays managed to recover some of the lands in Ross-shire that had belonged to their relatives and enemies, Neil Neilson Mackay, his brother Morgan Neilson Mackay, and Neil and Morgan's father-in-law Murray of Cubin, all three of whom had been defeated and killed by the Mackays of Strathnaver at the Battle of Drumnacoub in 1433. The evidence is also ample that the Rosses managed to secure some of these lands lying in the parishes of Edderton and Kincardine in Ross-shire. So it appears that the feud between the Mackays and the Rosses arose out of a scramble for disputed lands. Finally the Rosses gathered their forces to attack the invaders who were led by Angus Roy Mackay of Strathnaver, son of Neil "Bass" Mackay.

The exact date of the battle is uncertain, other than it happened before the Battle of Aldy Charrish, which documentary evidence dates to either July 1487 or June 1486. The date most commonly cited for events at Tarbat is 1486, but all that can be said is that it was probably some time in the 1480s.

== Battle ==
The Rosses appear to have encountered the Mackay raiding party on the Tarbat peninsula, where they were "fiercely attacked". It appears that many Mackays were killed before they sought shelter in the Tarbat church. More were apparently killed before the church was set on fire. Angus Roy MacKay was among those killed. As a poem put it :

The Lady Christian spoke : "How goes the fight?"
And William said:
"Forty Mackays are dead or wounded, what remains
Are cornered safely in the Tarbat Church
And father guards the door with his broad axe."

Archaeology supports this story. Archaeologists have been investigating the Tarbat Old Church at Portmahomack for evidence of a major monastery largely destroyed around 800AD. While the target of this presumed Viking raid has attracted most attention, a new church was built on the site in the 13th century. This "Church 4" apparently suffered a major fire during the Middle Ages. Fire has scorched the sandstone of the internal walling to a bright orange, even in the crypt, and charcoal from possible roof timbers or thatch was found in the nave near the crypt entrance.

Sir Robert Gordon, 1st Baronet's 17th century manuscript, A Genealogical History of the Earldom of Sutherland, which was written in about 1630, states: This Angus Macky, heir mentioned, wes afterward killed and burnt in the church of Tarbet, by the surname of Rosse, whom he had often molested with incursions and invasions.

James Fraser of Wardlaw wrote the Wardlaw Manuscript in about 1674. It states that the conflict at Tarbat took place in 1438 and gives the following details: This Anguis Macky, not content with what outrages he had formerly committed, and the slaughter at Cha blair Tannie, but resolves from thence to invade Rosse er he returned home, and, marching through Sutherland, crost at Port in Culternach, or the Meikle Ferry, with a company of rather desperat than resolut men, and, notwithstanding of the threates and interdictions of the monks of Fern (terrible enugh in these dayes to deterr any, nay the most barbarous, from outrages) he runss over the whole country, purposeing to make a prey of all in a peaceable time; but he was briskly mett with by the Rosses, who, killing all his men, persued himselfe to the church of Tarbit, takeing sanctury in the temple, quher they killed and burnt him. Thus the Rosses requitted him whom he often molested with incursions and invasions.

== Aftermath ==
John (Iain) Riabhach Mackay avenged his father's death by invading the Ross lands in 1487. This raid culminated in the Battle of Aldy Charrish at the head of the Kyle of Sutherland which saw Alexander Ross of Balnagowan and many of his kinsmen slaughtered. The Clan Ross never really recovered from this defeat.
