= Battle of Drumnacoub =

Scottish clan battle (c. 1427 and 1433)

Coordinates: 58°26′N 4°27′W

- Part of Clan Mackay succession dispute
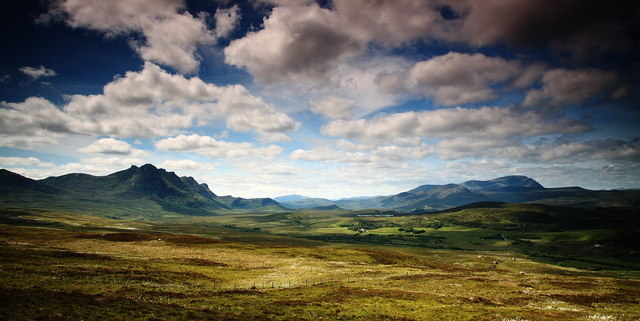
- Looking south across Carn Fada towards Ben Loyal (left) and Ben Hope (right)
| Date | c. 1427 to 1433 |
| Location | Southern end of Kyle of Tongue, Sutherland grid reference NC569519 |
| Result | Mackay victory |

Belligerents
| Clan Mackay | Clan Sutherland; Mackay rebels |

Commanders and leaders
| John Mackay; Angus Mackay † | Morgan Nielson Mackay †; Niel Nielson Mackay †; Angus Murray (of Aberscross) † |

Strength
| 1,200 men | 1,200, or 1,500 men |

Casualties and losses
| Angus Mackay "very few alive" | Morgan & Niel both killed "very few alive" |

The Battle of Drumnacoub (Battle of Druim na coub, Drum-ne-coub) was a Scottish clan battle involving factions of the Clan Mackay fought in the far northwest of Scotland, some time between 1429 and 1433. It took place on a hill called Carn Fada at the southern end of the Kyle of Tongue, between Ben Loyal and the village of Tongue. It was fought between members of the Clan Mackay and men of the Clan Sutherland. The battle was recorded by the 15th century chronicler, Walter Bower, in his work Scotichronicon.

On one side was the old chief, Angus Du (Dow) Mackay and his second son John Aberach Mackay. On the other side were Angus's cousins Morgan Neilson Mackay and Niel Neilson Mackay who were backed by troops from the Clan Sutherland, led by Angus Murray. Niel Nielson Mackay and Morgan Nielson Mackay were attempting to take the Mackay lands from their cousin, chief Angus Du Mackay.

== Background ==
Niel Vasse Mackay, the eldest son of chief Angus Du Mackay had been imprisoned at the Bass Rock by King James I of Scotland in 1428 as a result of the Battle of Harpsdale. (See Mackay 1829, p. 24 for details on Gordon's book).

Thomas Neilson Mackay, brother of Neil Neilson Mackay and Morgan Neilson Mackay had killed the Laird of Freswick by the name of Mowat. He had pursued and killed Mowat with all his company, near the town of Tain in Ross, within the chapel of St Duffus, which he also burnt to the ground. Mowat had retired himself to the chapel to find sanctuary. The King soon after denounced Thomas Neilson Mackay to be a rebel and promised his lands and possessions for a reward to any that would kill or apprehend him. Thomas was captured by Angus Murray of the Clan Sutherland with the help of Thomas's own brothers Morgan Neilson Mackay and Niel Neilson Mackay. After being handed over to the king, Thomas was executed at Inverness.

After these events the Mackays were divided; the elderly chief Angus-Du Mackay and his loyal second son John Mackay were at odds with Angus's cousins Morgan Neilson Mackay and Niel Neilson Mackay, who had betrayed their own brother Thomas, and the Earl of Sutherland and Angus Murray offered Niel and Morgan Mackay rewards for their services, including their daughters in marriage.

In order to complete his "design"; the Earl of Sutherland ordered all his forces to support Niel Nielson Mackay and Morgan Nielson Mackay in obtaining Angus Mackay's lands. Angus Mackay, by that time, was elderly and was at a loss as to how to act, but was advised by his second son John Mackay not to yield to any of their demands and that he would defend their country or die doing so. This affair was terminated by the decisive Battle of Drumnacoub, which has been described by the historians George Buchanan (1506-1582), John Lesley (1527-1596), the 17th century Sir Robert Gordon, and the 18th century John Pinkerton who quoted the 15th century chronicler, Walter Bower.

== 15th century contemporary evidence ==
Walter Bower's (c. 1385-1449) original 15th century contemporary account of the battle in his work Scotichronicon, which was later quoted by Pinkerton, is as follows:

Meanwhile, in spite of all the endeavours by James, the highlands remained in a state of constant rebellion and savage anarchy. In Strathnavern Angus Duff, and Angus Moray, both of them lately delivered from the imprisonment ordered at Inverness, met in conflict with twelve hundred men upon either side; and so fierce was the encounter that hardly nine of the whole were left alive.

== 16th century accounts ==
George Buchanan's (1506-1582) account is as follows:

Although this severity produced a little more quietness in the Ebudae and neighboring regions for the time, yet the restless disposition of the inhabitants would not allow the tranquillity to be of any long duration. The king, at the entreaty of his nobles, had released two Angusians, Duff and Moray, their principal leaders, on which, they immediately turned their rage upon each other. Having gathered together almost an equal number, for each supported about twelve hundred ruffians by public rapine, they engaged with such fury, that scarcely a messenger was left to carry the tidings of the their[sic] mutual destruction. Some say eleven, and others nine, were all that remained. It is certain however, that the king, who was much incensed against both parties, could hardly find any to punish.

John Lesley's or Leslie's (1527-1596) account is as follows:

The king efter this, rigorouslie punist al quha in his absence ony crime had committed. na nocht sa mekle he spairet as thame quhome the gouernour had proponet to correct and neglected: sa seueir in sik he was funde, that in the first eiris of his coronation, Historiographeris have writne of thrie thousands Justifiet. Bot for al his severitie, he culd noct stay Angus Duff of Stanaver, from spoyleing and waisting Moray land and Cathnes: quhair meitis him, passing throuch the cuntrie, the vther Angus of Morayland in plane battel: Thay met thair, sa scharpile sett onn: sa cruellie faucht, that skairse war left on the baith partes to tell tydengs to the king, or the maner how that met.

== The battle ==
The forces of Angus Du Mackay, led by his loyal second son John Aberach Mackay won the battle, although Angus Du Mackay was killed. Niel Nielson Mackay and Morgan Nielson Mackay whose forces were defeated were both also killed, as was their father-in-law Angus Murray. Sir Robert Gordon (1580–1656) wrote an account of this battle in his book A Genealogical History of the Earldom of Sutherland:

Angus Murray, for the performance of his engaged promise made to Niel and Morgan, gave them his two daughters in marriage; then gathering a company of Sutherland-men, with Earl Robert his attollerance, he went on with these two brethren into Strathnver, to invade the same. Angus-Dow MacKay hearing of their approach, convened his countrymen, and because he was unable himself in person to resist his enemies, he made his son John Aberach Mackay, commander of his host. When they were ready to encounter, some two miles from Tongue, at a place called Drum-ne-coub, Angus-Dow MacKay sent message unto his cousin-germans [sic], Niel and Morgan, offering them all his lands and possessions, except what is called Kintail in Strathnaver; which offer they did refuse, whereupon there ensued a cruel and sharp conflict, valiantly fought a long time with great slaughter on either side; Niel and Morgan trusting to their forces, John Aberach reposing his confidence in the equity of his cause, encouraged his men to assault their enemies afresh, who, with the like manhood, made stout resistance; by reason whereof there ensued such a cruel fight between them, that there remained, in the end very few alive on either side. John Aberach seemed to have victory, because he escaped with his life, yet very sore wounded, and mutilate by the loss of one of his arms. His father, Angus Dow MacKay, being carried thither to view the place of the conflict, and searching for the corpse of his unkind cousins, was there slain with an arrow, after the conflict by a Sutherland-man that was lurking in a bush hard by. Niel and Morgan, with their father-in-law Angus Murray, were slain; and as they had undertaken this enterprise upon an evil ground, so they perished therein accordingly.

== Aftermath ==
Upon the return of Niel Vasse Mackay, who had been imprisoned on the Bass Rock and who took over his deceased father's lands, he gave his younger brother John some lands of his own. Sir Robert Gordon also writes of the events after the Battle of Drumnacoub:

The Earl of Sutherland being advertised how all passed at Drum-na-coub, and being informed of Angus Murray his death, he pursued John Abeerach so hotly, that he constrained him, for safety of his life, to fly into the isles. But John returning from thence the night ensuing Christmas, he came to Strathully (Helmsdale), and there killed three of the Sutherlands at Dinaboll, having invaded them at unawares; whereupon Earl Robert pursued John Aberach the second time, so eagerly that he was constrained to submit himself, and crave him pardon for his offence, which he obtained upon his submission. Then again John Aberach settled himself into the country of Strathnaver, where he continued until the death of King James the First, that his brother, Neil-Vasse MacKay was relieved out of the Bass (in 1437), by the means of the lady of that place, who was his near kinswoman. And at Niel his return into Strathnaver John Aberach willingly surrendered unto him all his lands within the country. Yet Niel gave unto his brother John the lands about Lochnaver, as a possession to dwell in during his days; which lands his posterity, the Sleaght-ean Aberach (descendants of John) 'do possess and inhabit at this day'.

The 19th-century historian, Robert Mackay, disputes the account given by Sir Robert Gordon of the aftermath of the battle above, noting that Gordon was of the Earl of Sutherland's family (kindred). Robert Mackay says that it is absurd to think that John Mackay would have immediately fled to the isles in fear of the Earl of Sutherland, whose power he had just broken, and that if John Mackay did go to the isles then it would have been to visit his cousin, Alexander. Robert Mackay says it is more probable that John Mackay pursued the Sutherlanders, rather than having fled returning to kill three Sutherlanders as stated by Gordon.

The son of Niel Nielson Mackay who had rebelled against Angus Dow Mackay was John Bain Mackay who dropped the surname of Mackay and was progenitor of the Bain of Tulloch family.

The second half of the 15th century had seen a series of raids by the Mackays of Strathnaver on the Rosses of Balnagown, which according to some sources was as a result of a scramble for lands after the Battle of Drumnacoub: According to historian Angus Mackay, the evidence is ample that the Mackays managed to recover some of the lands in Ross-shire that had belonged to their relatives and enemies, Neil Neilson Mackay, his brother Morgan Neilson Mackay and Neil and Morgan's father-in-law Murray of Culbin, all three of whom had been defeated and killed by the Mackays of Strathnaver at the Battle of Drumnacoub in 1433. The evidence is also ample that the Rosses managed to secure some of these lands lying in the parishes of Edderton and Kincardine in Ross-shire. So it appears that the feud between the Mackays and the Rosses arose out of a scramble for disputed lands. Finally, the Rosses gathered their forces to attack the invaders who were led by Angus Roy Mackay of Strathnaver, son of Neil "Vasse" Mackay, at the Battle of Tarbat, some time in the 1480s.

== Bibliography ==
- Mackay, Robert (1829). History of the House and Clan of Mackay. 233 High Street, Edinburgh: Printed by Andrew Jack & Co.
