= Angus Du Mackay, 7th of Strathnaver =

Scottish clan chief (d. 1433)

Angus Du Mackay (Angus Mackay), 7th of Strathnaver (died 1433) was the seventh chief of the Clan Mackay, a Highland Scottish clan. He is recorded in the 15th-century Scottish chronicle, Scotichronicon, as Enneas-en-Imprissi meaning Angus the Absolute due to his power of commanding 4000 men.

== Early life ==
Angus Du Mackay, 7th of Strathnaver, was the eldest son of Angus Mackay, 6th of Strathnaver, and his wife who was a daughter of Torquil MacLeod, chief of the Clan MacLeod of Lewis.

== Battle of Tuiteam Tarbhach ==
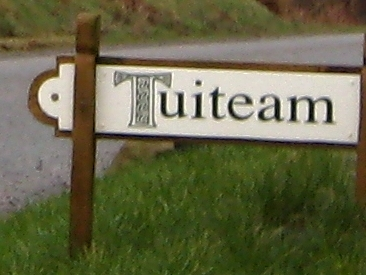
"Tuiteam"

The chief of the MacLeods of Lewis had heard that his sister, wife of Angus Mackay, 6th of Strathnaver, had been mistreated and according to historian Angus Mackay the MacLeods raided the Mackay's lands of Strathnaver. The Mackays pursued the MacLeods and the Battle of Tuiteam Tarbhach took place where the MacLeods were defeated. The Mackay historian discredits the account written by 17th-century historian Sir Robert Gordon who states that only one man of the MacLeods survived the battle.

== Battles of Dingwall and Harlaw ==
In 1411, a feud broke out over who was the rightful Earl of Ross, between Donald of Islay, Lord of the Isles (chief of Clan Donald) and the Stewart royal family. Donald of the Isles claimed the earldom through his marriage to Mariota, Countess of Ross.

Robert Stewart, Duke of Albany, third son of Robert II of Scotland naturally supported the claim to the earldom of Ross by his son John Stewart, Earl of Buchan and was supported by Alexander Stewart, Earl of Mar who was a son of Alexander Stewart, Earl of Buchan known as the Wolf of Badenoch. Angus Du Mackay, chief of Clan Mackay joined the Stewart confederacy and historian Angus Mackay states that Angus Du is believed to have been a cousin of the Earl of Mar.

Angus Du Mackay attacked Donald of Islay, Lord of the Isles at Dingwall in 1411. Known as the Battle of Dingwall, Mackay at the head of 4000 men was overpowered. The Lord of the Isles force is said to have numbered 10,000 men. Angus Du Mackay’s brother Rorie Gald was killed at the Battle of Dingwall and Angus Du himself was made a prisoner in a castle on the west coast. The Lord of the Isles then advanced towards Aberdeen where he was met by the Earl of Mar’s army and the Battle of Harlaw took place.

After the Battle of Harlaw the Lord of the Isles made an alliance with Angus Du Mackay. Mackay married the Lord of the Isles' sister Elizabeth. Historian Angus Mackay points out that 17th-century historian Sir Robert Gordon incorrectly states that Angus Du married a daughter of the Lord of the Isles and that she was in fact his sister. The alliance between Angus Du Mackay and Donald, Lord of the Isles was further strengthened by a charter granted to Angus Du’s son Neil from the Lord of the Isles for the lands of Creich.

== Battle of Harpsdale ==
In 1426, Angus Du Mackay led a raid into Caithness which resulted in the Battle of Harpsdale. Historian Angus Mackay states that Angus Du's purpose for this raid was that the lands belonged to the descendants of Nicholas Sutherland, 1st of Duffus who had murdered chief Donald Mackay, 5th of Strathnaver at Dingwall Castle in 1370.

== Parliament at Inverness ==
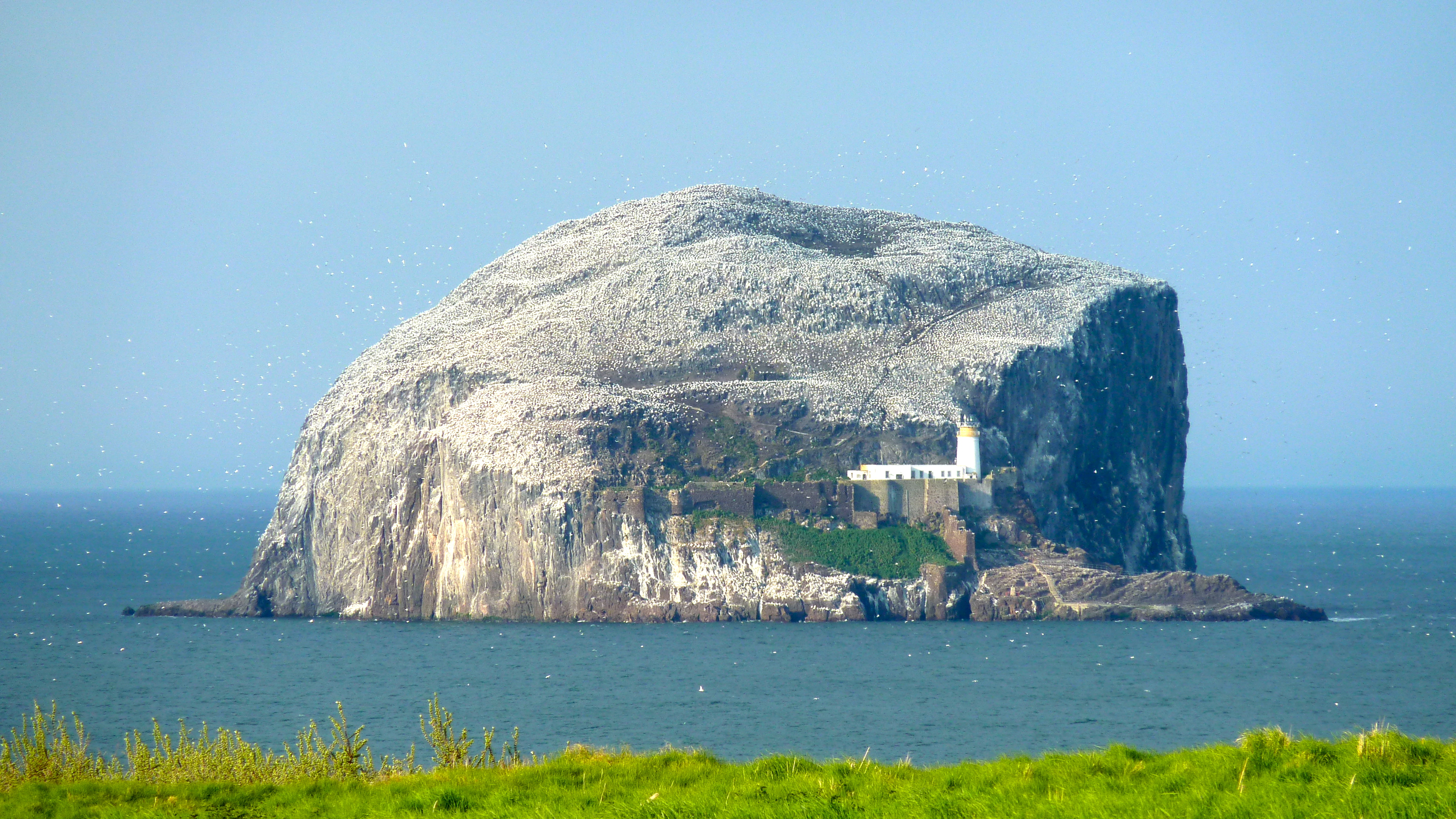
The Bass Rock, where Neil, son of Angus Du Mackay was imprisoned after the Parliament of Inverness in 1427

King James I of Scotland had been captured at the age of 14 by the English and kept as a prisoner until 1424. On his return to Scotland he found the country in a very distracted state. In 1427, the king came north and held a Parliament at Inverness, to which he summoned the Highland chieftains. The chieftains including Alexander of Islay, Earl of Ross the Lord of the Isles, Angus Du Mackay of Strathnaver, Kenneth Mor, his son in law Angus Moray and MacMathen were all clapped in irons. Angus Du Mackay was soon released but his eldest son Neil was kept as a hostage and was sent for a time to the Bass Rock.

== Battle of Drumnacoub ==
Not long after the Parliament at Inverness, Thomas Neilson Mackay, cousin of Angus Du Mackay killed Mowat, the Laird of Freswick in Tain. Thomas Neilson Mackay was then outlawed. He was betrayed by his own two brothers Neil Neilson Mackay and Morgan Neilson Mackay, instigated by Angus Moray of Pulrossie whose two daughters the two brothers had married. Angus Moray supported by his two sons-in-law, Neil Neilson Mackay and Morgan Neilson Mackay, then invaded Strathnaver the lands of their cousin, chief Angus Du Mackay. Angus Du Mackay was in a weak position with his eldest son still in prison on the Bass Rock after the Parliament of Inverness, as mentioned above. Angus Du himself was now elderly and so the duty of warding off the attack fell to his second son John Ian Mackay of Aberach who was still a teenager.

The Battle of Drumnacoub took place in 1433. Angus Moray with the men of Sutherland and supported by his sons-in-law, Neil Neilson Mackay and Morgan Neilson Mackay, advanced with a force of 1500 men. At the head of a pass north of the mountain Ben Loyal, within two miles of Castle Varrich they were met by the force of John Ian Mackay of Aberach, while the helpless Angus Du Mackay was carried in a litter. The Mackays under John Ian Mackay defeated Angus Moray’s men of Sutherland. Historian Angus Mackay again discredits 17th-century historian Sir Robert Gordon, who states that the two sides practically exterminated each other. The Mackay historian gives an account that gives John Ian Mackay a clear victory. Gordon's account also gives the Mackays the victory but says that they suffered heavy losses. Angus Du Mackay is said to have been killed after the battle by an arrow fired from one of the Sutherland men. Angus Moray, leader of the Sutherland force was killed in the battle along with his sons-in-law, Neil Neilson Mackay and Morgan Neilson Mackay. This battle is also mentioned by the historians George Buchanan (1506-1582) and the 18th century John Pinkerton who quoted the 15th century chronicler, Walter Bower.

== Family ==
Angus Du Mackay married firstly Elizabeth, sister of Donald of Islay, Lord of the Isles and daughter of John of Islay, Lord of the Isles and his wife Margaret Stewart, who was in turn a daughter of Robert II of Scotland. (Donald of Islay and John of Islay were the successive chiefs of Clan Donald). Angus Du Mackay and Elizabeth had one son:

1. Neil Mackay, 8th of Strathnaver, successor as chief of the Clan Mackay, known as Neil “Vasse” Mackay, (named so because he was imprisoned on the Bass Rock).

Angus Du Mackay married secondly, a daughter of Alexander Carrach MacDonald, chief of the Clan MacDonald of Keppoch, who in turn was a son of John of Islay, Lord of the Isles (chief of Clan Donald) and his wife Margaret Stewart who was a daughter of Robert II of Scotland. From this marriage Angus Du Mackay had the following sons:

1. John Ian Mackay, 1st of Aberach. Progenitor of the Mackay of Aberach family (also known as the Clan Aberach).
2. Roderick Mackay.
3. William Mackay.
4. Angus Mackay.

== Bibliography ==
- Bower, Walter (1447). Scotichronicon.
- Buchanan, George (1827) [Printed from original latin manuscript of 1579]. History of Scotland. Vol. 2. Glasgow and Edinburgh: Archibald Fullarton and Blackie and Son. "Republished in 1827 in English by James Aikman"
- Gordon, Sir Robert (1813) [Printed from original manuscript 1580 - 1656]. A Genealogical History of the Earldom of Sutherland. Edinburgh: A. Constable.
- Mackay, Angus (1906). The Book of Mackay. 25 George IV Bridge, Edinburgh: Norman Macleod.
- Mackay, Robert (1829). History of the House and Clan of Mackay. 233 High Street, Edinburgh: Andrew Jack & Co.
- Mackenzie, Alexander (1881). History of the Macdonalds and Lords of the Isles; with genealogies of the principal families of the name. Inverness: A. & W. Mackenzie.
- Pinkerton, John (1797). The History of Scotland. Vol. 1. The Poultry, London: Charles Dilly.

== See also ==
- Chiefs of Clan Mackay
- Clan Mackay
