= Elizabeth Sutherland, 10th Countess of Sutherland =

- Countess of Sutherland Coat of Arms
- Born: Unknown
- Died: 1535; Aboyne, Scotland
- Relatives: John Sutherland, 8th Earl of Sutherland (father); John Sutherland, 9th Earl of Sutherland (brother); Adam Gordon (husband)
- Military career
- Allegiance: Scotland

Elizabeth Sutherland, (died 1535) was the 10th Countess of Sutherland having succeeded to the Earldom of Sutherland after her brother John Sutherland, 9th Earl of Sutherland died in 1514.

== Early life ==
She was the daughter of John Sutherland, 8th Earl of Sutherland who died in 1508. He was initially succeeded by his son, John Sutherland, 9th Earl of Sutherland. However, having inherited his father's mental illness, the 9th Earl declared that his sister Elizabeth and her husband Adam Gordon, and their children were his nearest heirs. The 9th Earl died a month later in 1514 and was therefore succeeded by his sister Elizabeth and her husband Adam Gordon. Adam Gordon was a younger son of George Gordon, 2nd Earl of Huntly, chief of the Clan Gordon.

According to 17th-century historian Sir Robert Gordon, 1st Baronet, who himself was a younger son of Alexander Gordon, 12th Earl of Sutherland, Elizabeth Sutherland and Adam Gordon married in 1500. According to 19th-century historian William Fraser, Adam Gordon's mother was Annabella, the youngest daughter of James I of Scotland. According to Fraser, it was not until 1509 that Adam Gordon appears to have begun interfering with the affairs of the Sutherland estate, which according to Gordon was due to the mental weakness of the 9th Earl and that intervention was probably not necessary during the time of the 8th Earl.

== Dispute to the earldom of Sutherland ==
The 9th Earl died in July 1514 and it was not until 3 October 1514 that his sister Elizabeth was served as heir to him. The service of inquest was sat in Inverness and was opposed by her younger brother, Alexander Sutherland who had sent his "brother" Mr Robert Munro as his procurator to object to the proceedings. Sir Robert Gordon assumed Alexander Sutherland to be the rightful heir. Among the claims made by Alexander Sutherland's procurator was that Alexander Sutherland himself could not safely come to Inverness to oppose the service on account of the tyranny of the Earl of Huntly. Both Adam Gordon and the Earl of Huntly then gave assurance that Alexander Sutherland should have safe conduct to Inverness. However, he still does not appear to have attended. The only claim Mr Robert Munro made was that of the alleged existence of an entail by royal charter of the lands and earldom of Sutherland, but he was not able to produce this charter and so the jury accordingly proceeded with the service upon which a crown precept followed and Elizabeth Sutherland was given the lands on 30 June 1515, after which she and her husband were immediately known as the Earl and Countess of Sutherland. Adam Gordon styled himself as Earl of Sutherland in a letter in favour of Sir Robert McRaith as the chaplain of the church lands of St Andrew in Golspie.

According to Sir Robert Gordon, Adam Gordon, Earl of Sutherland having great troubles in his country became friendly with John Sinclair, 3rd Earl of Caithness. He goes on to say that while Adam was in Strathbogie (former name of his family's home of Huntly), Alexander Sutherland, claimant of the earldom of Sutherland, seized Dunrobin Castle which was the seat of the Earl and Countess of Sutherland. However, according to Fraser, according to a bond of friendship with the Earl of Caithness dated September 1516, Alexander Sutherland at that time was actually in possession of Dunrobin Castle. In the agreement, one of the clauses from the Earl and Countess of Sutherland was that the Earl of Caithness should recover Dunrobin Castle from the hands of Alexander Sutherland as quickly as possible. The Earl of Caithness was also to support and defend the Earl and Countess of Sutherland in their possession of the earldom. They also bound themselves to maintain and defend Caithness in his earldom. If Dunrobin Castle could not be speedily won then the Earl and Countess of Sutherland were to take refuge in any stronghold Caithness could provide for them in his territory.

How far the agreement was carried out is not clear, but from March 1517 until February 1518, Alexander Sutherland was in Edinburgh, either confined in Edinburgh Castle or under private custody, but this appears to have been brought about not by the Earl of Caithness but by the Earl of Huntly who was sheriff of Inverness-shire. Alexander Sutherland had seized and appropriated Crown dues for his own use and it was for this offence that he was imprisoned in Edinburgh Castle.

According to Sir Robert Gordon, in 1517, Alexander Sutherland had been persuaded by his sister Elizabeth to resist their enemy John Mackay, 11th of Strathnaver and that he had defeated him at the Battle of Torran Dubh in Sutherland. However, William Fraser disputes this version of events as it can be proved that Alexander Sutherland was in prison in the year of 1517 when the battle is supposed to have taken place and he was not released until 1518. According to early 20th-century historian Angus Mackay, the Battle of Torran Du was actually fought in 1517 between the Clan Mackay, with the support of the Clan Matheson and the Polsons, against the Murrays of Aberscross, the Clan Ross and the Clan Gunn, and he cited a historic manuscript of the Gunns to back up this theory.

According to Gordon, in 1518, Alexander Sutherland had gained great favour with both the Earl of Caithness and John Mackay, whose sister he had married. While Adam Gordon was absent in Strathbogie, Alexander Sutherland seized Dunrobin Castle, but it was later retaken, although he had already escaped. Alexander Sutherland was killed by forces of the Gordons at the subsequent Battle of Alltachuilain in 1519.

== Countess of Sutherland ==
In 1524, Earl Adam and the Countess of Sutherland were residing in Elgin where they granted a charter for the lands of Proncy, Proncy-nain, Evelix and others to William Sutherland, 5th of Duffus. Another writ was granted by them to John Kinnaird for the lands of Skelbo and others.

Elizabeth, Countess of Sutherland died in September 1535 at Aboyne and was buried there. According to Sir Robert Gordon, she had been "a lady of good judgement, and great modestie". Her husband Adam Gordon died on 17 March 1537-8 also in Aboyne and was buried beside his wife.

== Family ==
Elizabeth, Countess of Sutherland and her husband Adam Gordon had the following children:

1. Alexander Gordon, Master of Sutherland, who predeceased his parents. His son was John Gordon, 11th Earl of Sutherland.
2. John Gordon, who left a daughter who married George Gordon of Cochlarachie.
3. Mr Adam Gordon, who lived in Aboyne and who was killed at the Battle of Pinkie in 1547. He left an illegitimate son, Adam Gordon of Golspie-Kirkton, who died in 1626.
4. Gilbert Gordon of Garty, who is mentioned in a charter of John, Earl of Sutherland in 1563. He married Isabel Sinclair, daughter of the Laird of Dunbeath, leaving two sons, John and Patrick, and several daughters. His wife was accused of poisoning John, Earl of Sutherland, in 1568. He also had an illegitimate son, George Gordon of Marle in Strath Ullie.
5. Beatrix, named as a daughter by Gordon, married the Laird of Gormack.
6. Eleanor, named as a daughter by Gordon, married firstly, Gordon of Tillwhowdie, and secondly, George Gordon of Craig.
7. Elizabeth, named as a daughter by Gordon, married the Laird of Lethinite.
8. A daughter (name unknown) mentioned by Gordon, married the Laird of Leys and Birkenbog.
9. An illegitimate daughter who married John Robson, chieftain of the Clan Gunn.

Peerage of Scotland
Preceded by John Sutherland	Earl of Sutherland; 1514 – 1535	Succeeded by John Gordon
