= Battle of Torran Dubh =

Scottish clan battle in 1517 in Sutherland, in the Scottish Highlands

Coordinates: 58.003°N 4.179°W

The Battle of Torran Dubh also known as the Battle of Torran-dow or the Battle of Torran Du was a Scottish clan battle that was fought in 1517 in Sutherland, in the Scottish Highlands.

There are two very different accounts of this battle. The first was written by 17th-century historian Sir Robert Gordon, 1st Baronet, who himself was a younger son of Alexander Gordon, 12th Earl of Sutherland, and it describes a battle fought between the Earl of Sutherland's forces who defeated the Clan Mackay of Strathnaver. The Earldom of Sutherland having recently passed to the Gordon family through marriage. However, this version of events is disputed. Firstly, late 19th-century historian Sir William Fraser states that Alexander Sutherland, who according to Gordon led the Earl of Sutherland's force at the battle, was in prison for the whole year of 1517 when the battle is supposed to have taken place. Secondly, early 20th-century historian Angus Mackay states that the battle was actually fought between the Clan Mackay, who were defeated, but who had fought against the Murrays of Aberscross, the Clan Ross and the Clan Gunn, and cited a historic manuscript as his source. Angus Mackay also agreed with Fraser's observations about Alexander Sutherland being in prison when the battle is supposed to have taken place.

== Sir Robert Gordon's account ==
Battle of Torran Dubh
- Part of the Scottish clan wars
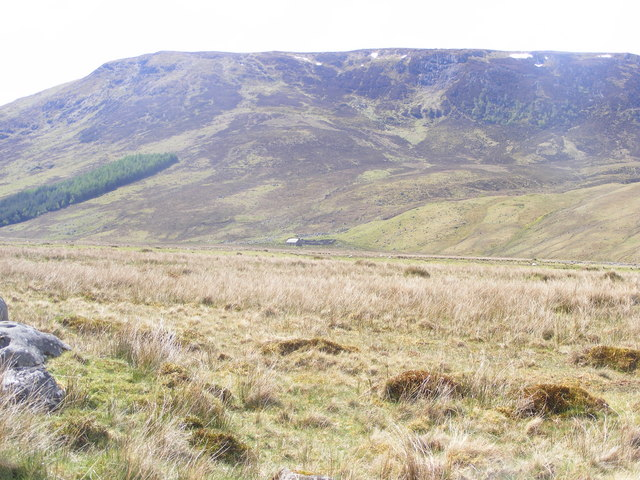
- Torran Dubh
Date	1517
Location	Torran Dubh, near Rogart and Strathfleet, county of Sutherland, Scotland
Result	Clan Sutherland victory

Belligerents
Clan Sutherland supported by men from the Clan Gordon	Clan Mackay

Commanders and leaders
Alexander Sutherland, 1st of Killipheder; John Murray of Aberscross; William Mackames of Clan Gunn	John Mackay, 11th of Strathnaver; Donald Mackay

Strength
Unknown	Unknown

Casualties and losses
38	216

=== Background ===
John Sutherland, 9th Earl of Sutherland, chief of the Clan Sutherland died in 1514. He was succeeded by his sister, Elizabeth Sutherland, 10th Countess of Sutherland. Elizabeth would go on to marry Adam Gordon, the second son of George Gordon, 2nd Earl of Huntly, chief of the powerful Clan Gordon in 1517. Adam and Elizabeth's son Alexander Gordon would become the heir to the Earldom of Sutherland and chiefship of the Clan Sutherland.

The Battle of Torran Dubh took place because John Mackay, 11th of Strathnaver, chief of Clan Mackay, and later the brother in law of Alexander Sutherland (Elizabeth's younger half-brother) was against the Gordon family taking over as Earls of Sutherland. According to historian Sir Robert Gordon (1580–1656), Elizabeth persuaded her younger half-brother, Alexander Sutherland, to resist Mackay, as this battle took place before Alexander Sutherland had married Mackay's sister.

=== The battle ===
According to Sir Robert Gordon, many on the Mackay side were killed, but few on the Sutherland side. An account of the battle was written in the book Conflicts of the Clans published by the Foulis Press in 1764, written from a manuscript from the time of King James VI of Scotland (Sir Robert Gordon's A Genealogical History of the Earldom of Sutherland).

Adam Gordon, first of that surname, Earl of Sutherland having married Elizabeth Sutherland, heiress of that country, took journey to Edinburgh, the year of God 1517, to dispatch some affairs there, which did concern the settling of his estate, leaving the commandment of the country, in his absence, to Alexander Sutherland (base brother to his wife Elizabeth) and to John Murray of Abirscors; which John Mackay of Strathnaver, understanding (having now appeased his civil discords at home, by the death of his uncle Neil) this occasion, in the very change of surnames in Sutherland, to try if he could gain anything by spoiling that country; and thereupon assembling together all the forces of Strathnaver, Assynt and Eddrachillis, with all such as he could purchase out of the west and north-west isles of Scotland, invades the country of Sutherland with all hostility, burning and spoiling all before him.

The inhabitants of Sutherland do speedily convene together with all the parts of the country; and so, under the conduct of Alexander Sutherland, John Murray, and William Mackames, they rencounter with John Mackay and his company at a place called Torran Dubh, beside Rogart, in Strathfleet, where there ensued a fierce and cruel conflict.

The Sutherland men chased John Mackay's vanguard, and made them retire to himself where he stood in battle array, then did he select and chose a number of the ablest men in all his host, and, with these, he himself returned again to the conflict, leaving his brother Donald to conduct the rest, and to support him as necessity should require; whereupon they do begin a more cruel fight than before, well fought on either side.

In the end, after long resistance, the Sutherland men obtained the victory; few of these that came to renew the fight escaped, but only John Mackay himself, and that very hardly. Neil MacIan MacAngus of Assynt was there slain, with divers of his men. There were 216 of the Strathnaver men left dead in the field, besides those that died in the chase. There were slain of Sutherland men 38. Not long thereafter John Mackay sent William and Donald, two brethren, with a company of men, to invade John Murray, with whom they met at a place called Loch-Sallachie, in Sutherland. After a sharp skirmish, both the chieftains of the Strathnaver men were slain, with divers of their men, and the rest put to flight; neither was the victory pleasing to John Murray, for he lost there his brother, called John Roy-Murray.

=== Aftermath ===
In the aftermath of the Battle of Torran Dubh other people rose up against the Gordon family holding the Earldom of Sutherland. Elizabeth, Countess of Sutherland's younger half-brother, Alexander Sutherland, married a sister of John Mackay. Alexander Sutherland then claimed the Earldom of Sutherland for himself and seized Dunrobin Castle, seat of the Earl of Sutherland. Adam Gordon with his family were then forced to flee to Strathbogie (home of the Gordons of Huntly) until he was reinforced by his father's and elder brother's forces from the Clan Gordon. In 1518 or 1519 the Battle of Alltachuilain took place where Alexander Sutherland was killed by forces loyal to his sister Elizabeth and her husband Adam Gordon.

According to Sir Robert Gordon, in 1522 Alexander Gordon, the Master of Sutherland overthrew John Mackay of Strathnaver at Lairg, and forced him to submit himself to the Earl of Sutherland; unto whom John Mackay gave a bond of manrent and service.

After Alexander Sutherland's death William Sutherland, 6th of Duffus who descended from Kenneth de Moravia, 4th Earl of Sutherland would claim the Earldom of Sutherland. However, William Sutherland, 6th of Duffus was killed by Andrew Stewart, Bishop of Caithness in 1530.

Adam Gordon and Elizabeth, Countess of Sutherland's eldest son, Alexander Gordon the Master of Sutherland, died in 1530, five years before his mother. His son John Gordon succeeded as the 11th Earl of Sutherland.

== Historical accuracy ==
Nineteenth-century historian Sir William Fraser casts doubt on the events concerning the Battle of Torran Dubh or Torrandow, stating that Alexander Sutherland, who is alleged by Sir Robert Gordon to have been persuaded by his sister Elizabeth, Countess of Sutherland to resist Mackay, was in prison for the whole year of 1517, when the battle is said to have taken place.

== Angus Mackay's account ==
Battle of Torran Du
- Part of the Scottish clan wars
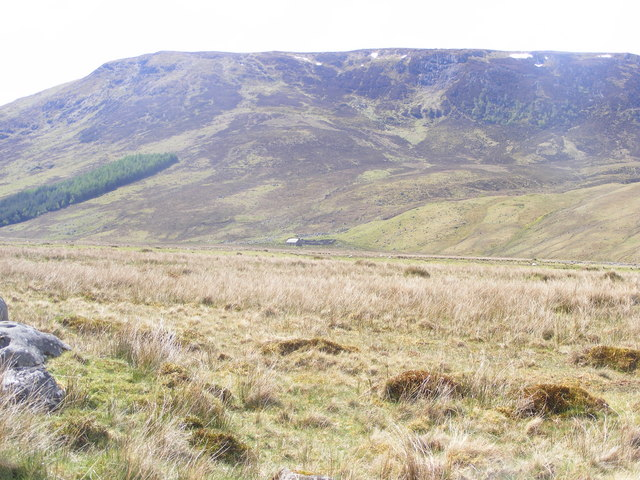
- Torran Du
Date	1517
Location	Torran Du, near Rogart and Strathfleet, county of Sutherland, Scotland
Result	Victory for Murrays, Rosses and Gunns

Belligerents
Murrays of Aberscross; Clan Ross; Clan Gunn	Clan Mackay; Clan Matheson; Polsons

Commanders and leaders
Unknown	John Mackay, 11th of Strathnaver

Strength
Unknown	Unknown

Casualties and losses
Unknown	Unknown

=== The battle ===
According to early 20th-century historian Angus Mackay, the Battle of Torran Du was fought in 1517 between the Clan Mackay, with the support of the Clan Matheson and the Polsons, against the Murrays of Aberscross, the Clan Ross and the Clan Gunn. Angus Mackay agrees with historian Sir William Fraser that the battle did not take place how Sir Robert Gordon describes it, as it is confirmed that Alexander Sutherland was in prison when it was supposed to have taken place in 1517. According to Angus Mackay there was no fighting in the policy of Adam Gordon, Earl of Sutherland, but does say that Alexander Sutherland was "assassinated" by Gordon emissaries in 1519. Historian Angus Mackay quoted the MS Account of the Gunns, a historic manuscript as his source for the Battle of Torran Du. According to this account the battle was initially going in favour of the Mackays, until the Gunns appeared over the brow of the hill and charged. The Mackays and Mathesons prudently left the battle, but many of the Polsons were slain.

Angus Mackay quotes a Scottish Gaelic poem from the MS that reads:

Thainig na Gunich 's gu'n tainig iad, 'S ann an deagh am a thainig iad, Thair iad as Macaoidh 's sial Mhothan, Mharbhadh leo siol Phail gun acain.

This translates in English as:

The Gunns came and came they did, T'was in an hour of need they came. The Mackays and the Mathiesons fled, But the Polsons were mercilessly slain.

=== Aftermath ===
According to historian Angus Mackay a few months after the battle another skirmish took place upon the borders of Ross in the parish of Rogart in which on one side William Mackay, chieftain of the Mackay of Aberach branch of clan was killed as was his brother Donald, and on the other side was killed John Murray of Aberscross. Shortly after this the Mackays burned the town of Pitfure in Strathfleet, Rogart. However, this was immediately followed by a bond of friendship between the Mackays and Adam Gordon, Earl of Sutherland dated 16 August 1518. Angus Mackay states that historian Sir Robert Gordon incorrectly refers to these skirmishes as "defeats" for the Mackays, and that Gordon also fails to mention that the Mackays rounded the year off by securing a title to the lands in the said parish of Rogart as confirmed by the Reay Papers. Angus Mackay also disputes Sir Robert Gordon's account given above that in 1522 Sir Alexander Gordon, Master of Sutherland overthrew John Mackay of Strathnaver at Lairg and that Mackay then submitted himself to Gordon, the Earl of Sutherland. Angus Mackay explains that the Earl, resigning the earldom into his son Alexander's hands was simply renewing the bond of friendship that he had made with Mackay in 1518 this time with his son Alexander.
