= Alexander Gordon, Master of Sutherland =

Scottish magnate

Alexander Gordon, Master of Sutherland (c.1505-1530), Scottish magnate, made Earl of Sutherland in 1527.

== Early life ==
Alexander Gordon was the son of Adam Gordon of Aboyne (d.1538) and Elizabeth Sutherland, 10th Countess of Sutherland (d.1535), the daughter of John Sutherland, 8th Earl of Sutherland.

== Sutherland estate ==
19th-20th century historian Angus Mackay rejects the history written by 17th-century historian Sir Robert Gordon, 1st Baronet who himself was a son of Alexander Gordon, 12th, Earl of Sutherland. Sir Robert Gordon stated that between 1517 and 1522, John Mackay, 11th of Strathnaver led six warlike expeditions of his clansmen into Sutherland in which the Mackays were defeated in every one of them. According to Sir Robert Gordon, one of these battles was the Battle of Torran Dubh, in which Elizabeth, Countess of Sutherland had persuaded her half brother, Alexander Sutherland, to resist John Mackay, whose sister Alexander Sutherland later married. However, both historians Angus Mackay and Sir William Fraser show that it can be proved that Alexander Sutherland was in prison in 1517 when the Battle of Torran Dubh is supposed to have taken place. Angus Mackay says that the Battle of Torran Dubh was actually fought by the Clan Mackay against the Murrays, Clan Ross and Clan Gunn, and not against the family of Sutherland. According to historian Angus Mackay a few months after the battle another skirmish took place upon the borders of Ross in the parish of Rogart in which on one side William Mackay, chieftain of the Mackay of Aberach branch of clan was killed as was his brother Donald, and on the other side was killed John Murray of Aberscross. Shortly after this the Mackays burned the town of Pitfure in Strathfleet, Rogart. However, this was immediately followed by a bond of friendship between the Mackays and Adam Gordon, Earl of Sutherland dated 16 August 1518, in which Mackay renewed the bond that his father had made with the Gordon Earl of Sutherland before him. Angus Mackay states that historian Sir Robert Gordon incorrectly refers to these skirmishes as "defeats" for the Mackays, and that Gordon also fails to mention that the Mackays rounded the year off by securing a title to the lands in the said parish of Rogart as confirmed by the Reay Papers. Angus Mackay also disputes Sir Robert Gordon's account that in 1522, Sir Alexander Gordon, Master of Sutherland overthrew John Mackay of Strathnaver at Lairg and that Mackay then submitted himself to Gordon, the Earl of Sutherland. Angus Mackay explains that Earl Adam, resigning the earldom into his son Alexander's hands was simply renewing the bond of friendship that he had made with Mackay in 1518 this time with his son Alexander.

William Sutherland, 6th of Duffus, as the new Laird of Skelbo and having entered into a fresh acquisition of territory gave a bond of manrent to Alexander Gordon, Master of Sutherland on September 4, 1529, which acknowledged that the Master of Sutherland had received him as a tenant and vassal in the lands. A breach of the bond of service and manrent would incur a fine of £1500 Scots, £500 of which would have to be paid to Dornoch Cathedral, £500 to the Master of Sutherland and £500 to the King.

Perhaps in connection with Alexander's marriage to Janet Stewart, daughter of John Stewart, 2nd Earl of Atholl, his parents resigned the Earldom of Sutherland to Alexander in November 1527, and a crown charter to this effect was issued in December. Alexander, now Earl of Sutherland lived at Dunrobin Castle, and died there on 13 January 1530.

== Master's charter ==
Alexander's royal charter of the earldom, dated 1 December 1527 describes his parents as the Earl of Countess of Sutherland. They resigned to him the earldom of Sutherland and its lands, Dunrobin with all its tenants and outliers, mills, sea and freshwater fishing, patronage of the church and chapel there, with some reservations to Adam and Elizabeth in their lifetimes. As Alexander pre-deceased his parents, he did not profit from the earldom in full.

== Family ==
With Janet Stewart, Alexander had children:

- John Gordon, 11th Earl of Sutherland
- Alexander Gordon (of Kintessock), (d.1552)
- William Gordon
- Janet Gordon, married Patrick Dunbar of Westfield and Cumnock
- Beatrice Gordon, married William Sinclair of Dunbeath.

Preceded by John de Moravia, 9th Earl of Sutherland	Earl of Sutherland; 1527–1530	Succeeded by John Gordon, 11th Earl of Sutherland
