= Sutherland of Killipheder =

Minor noble Scottish family

The Sutherlands of Kilphedder (Killipheder) were a minor noble Scottish family and a branch of the ancient Clan Sutherland, a Highland Scottish clan. They were seated at Killipheder, in the county of Sutherland, Scotland.

== History ==
Alexander Sutherland, 1st of Killipheder was a younger son of John Sutherland, 8th Earl of Sutherland, (chief of Clan Sutherland). Alexander Sutherland's legitimacy has been questioned and 17th-century historian, Sir Robert Gordon, 1st Baronet, stated that Alexander was definitely illegitimate.

=== Dispute to the Earldom of Sutherland (16th-century) ===
John Sutherland, 8th Earl of Sutherland was succeeded firstly by his eldest son, John Sutherland, 9th Earl of Sutherland who died without an heir in 1514. Before his death, the 9th Earl of Sutherland had already declared that his sister Elizabeth Sutherland and her husband Adam Gordon (younger son of George Gordon, 2nd Earl of Huntly, chief of Clan Gordon), as well as their children, were his nearest heirs.

In 1517 the Battle of Torran Dubh took place in which it is claimed, by Sir Robert Gordon, that Elizabeth persuaded her younger brother Alexander Sutherland (1st of Killipheder) to lead the Clan Sutherland against the Clan Mackay whom they defeated. However, the historical accuracy of this story has been questioned by historian William Fraser who stated that Alexander Sutherland was in prison for the whole year of 1517 when the battle is said to have taken place. Some time after this Alexander Sutherland, 1st of Killipheder married a sister of John Mackay, the chief of the clan he had allegedly fought against at Torran Dubh. Mackay then apparently tampered with Alexander Sutherland to claim the Earldom of Sutherland for himself, which he did, rebelling against his sister Elizabeth and her husband Adam Gordon. Alexander Sutherland, 1st of Killipheder was killed in the resulting Battle of Alltachuilain in 1518 and the Earldom of Sutherland remained with the descendants of his sister Elizabeth and her husband Adam Gordon.

In 1550 or 1551, Alexander Sutherland's son, John Sutherland, made an attempt on Dunrobin Castle, seat of the Earls and Countesses of Sutherland. However, he was killed in the garden of the castle. This had come about because the people of Sutherland disliking the restraints put on them by the Gordons, placed John Sutherland at their head and proceeded to attack Alexander Gordon, brother of John Gordon, 11th Earl of Sutherland, while he was attending church. Alexander Gordon gathered his men and the attackers were dispersed. William Murray of the family of Pulrossie subsequently murdered John Sutherland on the Nether Green in the west corner of the garden at Dunrobin. However, William Murray was later killed in revenge for this by Sutherland, the laird of Clyne.

=== Later conflicts ===
In 1586, William Sutherland of Killipheder, grandson of Alexander "the heir", fought in support of the Gordon Earls of Sutherland at the Battle of Leckmelm against the Clan Gunn.

In 1623, Alexander Sutherland of Killipheder held joint command of the left wing of Sir Robert Gordon, 1st Baronet's army that marched into Caithness and took the surrender of George Sinclair, 5th Earl of Caithness who had been declared a rebel.

=== 19th century ===
The chief of the Clan Sutherland was the Earl of Sutherland. However, upon succeeding to the Earldom in 1766, Elizabeth, Countess of Sutherland, infant daughter of the 18th Earl and later the Duchess of Sutherland, could not succeed as chief of the clan which could then not descend to a female. William Sutherland of Killipheder (d.1832) enjoyed a small annuity from the Countess and was regarded as the eldest male descendant of the original earls. However, John Campbell Sutherland of Forse was then considered the real chief of the clan.

== Killipheder ==
The descendants of Alexander Sutherland, 1st of Killipheder occupied the lands for generations on payment of a nominal rent to the Earls of Sutherland. The ruins at Kilphedder are now more immediately connected with one of his descendants: William Sutherland of Kilphedder who was a man of gigantic strength and stature who repaired and extended the residence of his ancestors.

== List of Lairds of Killipheder (incomplete) ==
- Alexander Sutherland, 1st of Killipheder.
- William Sutherland, 2nd of Killipheder (his two younger sons were Hugh and Angus Sutherland).
- William Sutherland, 3rd of Killipheder.
- Hugh Sutherland, 4th of Killipheder
- William Sutherland, 5th of Killipheder

== Descendants ==
According to volume VIII of The Scots Peerage which was published in 1911, the descendants of Alexander Sutherland, 1st of Killipheder continued until 1829, "and may still exist".

== See also ==
- Earl of Sutherland
- Clan Sutherland
- Sutherland of Forse
- Lord Duffus
