= John Sutherland, 8th Earl of Sutherland =

Scottish aristocrat

- Earl of Sutherland Coat of Arms
- Born: Unknown
- Died: 1508; Dunrobin Castle, Sutherland, Scotland
- Relatives: John Sutherland, 7th Earl of Sutherland (father); Fingole or Catherine, Countess of Sutherland (wife); John Sutherland, 9th Earl of Sutherland (son); Elizabeth Sutherland, 10th Countess of Sutherland (daughter)
- Military career
- Allegiance: Scotland

John Sutherland, (died 1508) was the 8th Earl of Sutherland and chief of the Clan Sutherland, a Scottish clan of the Scottish Highlands.

== Early life ==
He was the son of John Sutherland, 7th Earl of Sutherland and Margaret, daughter or sister of Sir William Ballie of Lamington. His elder brother, Alexander, Master of Sutherland, had predeceased their father between 1444 and 1456, and John, therefore, succeeded as the 8th earl.

== Earl of Sutherland ==
John Sutherland, 8th Earl of Sutherland is referred to in 1464 as being represented by a prosecutor when James III of Scotland unusually made the formal revocation of the alienation of Crown property. John, Earl of Sutherland received in 1467, a charter of the lands of "Spanziedale", now called Spinningdale, and also Pulrossie. According to 19th-century historian William Fraser, the 17th-century historian Sir Robert Gordon, 1st Baronet knew of the original writ but did not give the full details and that it was no longer extant. However, as these lands had been granted to Celestine MacDonald (son of Alexander of Islay, Earl of Ross), in 1464, it is probable that they were bestowed by him.

John Sutherland, 8th Earl of Sutherland held the earldom for more than forty years. He granted, in 1471, as superior a precept for John Sutherland of Forse as heir to his father, Richard Sutherland of Forse, in the lands of Backies, Torrish, and Drummoy. In the same year, the earl granted to Nicolas Sutherland, son and heir of Angus Sutherland of Torboll, a charter for the lands of Torboll, Pronsy, and others which had been resigned into the earl's hands at Dornoch. Twenty years later, Nicholas Sutherland of Torboll, and his brother, Donald, were both dead and so the lands went to the third son of Angus, Hugh.

In 1476, the Earl of Sutherland was in dispute with Sir Robert Crichton of Sanquhar over the property of the lands of "Cragton", which according to Fraser was perhaps Culmaily in Golspie. The case was tried before the Lords auditors who decided against the earl. Two other cases of litigation were recorded concerning the earl in 1494. The first was at the instance of Sir Gilbert Keith of Inverugie, for the reduction of a letter of reversion granted to him by the earl of £40 worth of lands in Strath Ullie in Sutherland; and secondly, a charter made by Sir Gilbert in favour of the earl for £40 worth of lands in Subister and others, in Caithness. The Lords of Council continued the case for the earl to produce his titles, but no decision is recorded.

Also in 1494, the Lords of Council declared that the Earl of Sutherland and his accomplices had done wrong in taking Skelbo Castle and also in taking two children of John Murray. They also ordered the earl to deliver the castle to Thomas Kinnaird, to be held by him in the terms of a charter, to set the children free and to pay 100 merks to Kinnaird. No further proceedings against the earl are recorded but the Murrays and Kinnairds continued to debate possession of the castle.

The earl is mentioned in connection with the Battle of Aldy Charrish in the 1480s, where according to Gordon, the earl's uncle, Robert Sutherland, led a company of Sutherland men on the side of the Clan Mackay against the Clan Ross. However, 19th-20th century historian Angus Mackay disputes Sutherland's presence at the battle stating that it would be unlikely that the Earl of Sutherland at the time would have assisted against the Rosses as he was married to a daughter of the Ross chief of Balnagowan, and also that the feudal superiority of the Sutherlands over the Mackays "nowhere existed save in his own fertile imagination". Fraser also adds that if Robert Sutherland was present at this battle then he must have been a very old man. Gordon also stated that this Robert Sutherland led the forces that defeated the forces of John of Islay, Earl of Ross at the Battle of Skibo and Strathfleet in 1455, having been sent to do so by his elder brother, John Sutherland, 7th Earl of Sutherland.

According to historian D. M Rose, the 7th and 8th Earls of Sutherland did little to advance their family's reputation, leaving their kinsman the Murays of Culbin, Pulrossie and Aberscross to fight their battles.

Gordon also records that two sons of the 8th Earl's "bastard" brother, Thomas, had incensed the earl by their conduct and so he ordered them killed. One of them was slain within Dunrobin Castle, while the other escaped some distance, but being wounded was soon overtaken and dispatched. Gordon also stated that the earl was charged with unkindness to his mother, whose building at Helmsdale is said to have been pulled down as well as forcing her into a second marriage. However, Fraser states that the latter accusation has shown to be unfounded. According to Fraser, the earl's shortcomings were due to his mental weakness, which Gordon says nothing of. A "breive of idiotry" was issued by James IV of Scotland in 1494, and Sir Duncan Forster of Skipnish, John Cumming of Earnside, and Alexander Cumming of Altyre were sworn in as sheriffs of Inverness, specially appointed to carry out the legal services of the brief. The barons and freeholders of the shires of Inverness, Elgin, Forres, Banff and Aberdeen, were summoned to attend the inquest. Fraser stated that there is no record of the proceedings, but a proclamation of the brief was duly made, and the earl, having been declared incapable of managing his own affairs, was placed under the care of a tutor. According to Fraser, this had an important bearing on the circumstances in which his daughter, Elizabeth, later succeeded to the earldom. The earl survived for some years after this, but under continuous guardianship. The last record was an order issued in February 1499 by the Lords of Council requiring Sir James Dunbar of Cumnock to bring the earl and his minor son to the king, their expenses being paid for.

According to Gordon, John Sutherland, 8th Earl of Sutherland died in 1508, but Fraser stated that the documents which would have confirmed this were no longer in the family charter chest.

== Family ==
Fraser stated that there was considerable difficulty in identifying the marriages of John, 8th Earl of Sutherland, even though Gordon stated that he married firstly, a daughter of John of Islay, Earl of Ross and Lord of the Isles. Fraser stated that as the earl received a grant for the lands of Spinningdale in 1467 which in 1464 had been granted to Celestine MacDonald, that it is not improbable that the earl had actually married a daughter of Celestine MacDonald. When the earl was summoned to Edinburgh in 1499, the record refers to a divorce between him and his wife who was named as "Fingole". Fraser stated that this Fingole has not been identified but that the wife of Celestine MacDonald had a similar name and therefore suggested a descent from that family. However, Fraser also states that later in 1509 to 1512 when the rents of the earldom of Sutherland were being administered by the Crown, a Catherine, Countess of Sutherland, is found drawing terce from the lands and that this is clear proof that she was the widow of John, Earl of Sutherland, but it has not been ascertained who she was or if she was identical with Fingole. According to 19th-20th century historian Angus Mackay, the earl was, if not married to, at least hand-fasted with a daughter of the chief of the Clan Ross of Balnagown Castle.

John Sutherland, 8th Earl of Sutherland had the following children:

1. John Sutherland, 9th Earl of Sutherland, heir and successor, died 1514.
2. Elizabeth Sutherland, 10th Countess of Sutherland, successor of her elder brother John, 9th Earl. She married Adam Gordon, a younger son of George Gordon, 2nd Earl of Huntly, the chief of the Clan Gordon.
3. Alexander Sutherland, 1st of Killipheder, recorded as an illegitimate son by Gordon. He married a sister of John Mackay, 11th of Strathnaver, chief of Clan Mackay, and disputed the right to the Earldom of Sutherland with his elder sister Elizabeth and her Gordon husband, apparently at the instigation of Mackay. According to Gordon, Alexander Sutherland was later killed by the Gordons who succeeded as Earls of Sutherland at the Battle of Alltachuilain in 1519 or 1520.
4. George Sutherland, who according to Gordon was another illegitimate son and who died young.

Peerage of Scotland
Preceded by John Sutherland	Earl of Sutherland c. 1460 – 1508	Succeeded by John Sutherland
