= John Mackay, 11th of Strathnaver =

John Mackay, 11th of Strathnaver (died 1529), was the eleventh chief of the ancient Clan Mackay, a Scottish clan of the Scottish Highlands.

== Early life ==
John Mackay, 11th of Strathnaver, was the eldest son of Iye Roy Mackay, 10th of Strathnaver, and his wife who was the daughter of Norman, son of Patrick O’Beolan of Carloway, Lewis. His parents' marriage did not conform with canon law, but his father, Iye Roy Mackay, managed to secure a precept of legitimation from James IV of Scotland for his two sons, John and Donald Mackay.

== The Earldom of Sutherland ==
On 3 October 1514 at Inverness, Elizabeth Sutherland, 10th Countess of Sutherland, spouse of Adam Gordon who was in turn the brother of the Gordon Earl of Huntly, was served heir to her brother, John Sutherland, 9th Earl of Sutherland. Historian Angus Mackay states that the rightful heir was in fact Elizabeth's half-brother, Alexander Sutherland. Alexander Sutherland claimed the Earldom of Sutherland for himself, but was ”assassinated” by Gordon emissaries in 1519 and this is how the earldom of Sutherland passed from the line of Sutherland to that of the Gordons. One of John Mackay, 11th of Strathnaver's sisters was married to Alexander Sutherland. According to 17th-century historian Sir Robert Gordon, 1st Baronet who himself was a son of Alexander Gordon, 12th Earl of Sutherland, both John Mackay of Strathnaver and Alexander Sutherland were bastards, but this is rejected by historian Angus Mackay.

Historian Angus Mackay again rejects the history written by Sir Robert Gordon, son of the Earl of Sutherland, who says that between 1517 and 1522 John Mackay of Strathnaver led six warlike expeditions of his clansmen into Sutherland in which the Mackays were defeated in every one of them. According to Sir Robert Gordon, one of these battles was the Battle of Torran Dubh, in which Elizabeth, Countess of Sutherland had persuaded her half brother, Alexander Sutherland, to resist John Mackay, whose sister Alexander Sutherland later married. However, both historians Angus Mackay and Sir William Fraser show that it can be proved that Alexander Sutherland was in prison in 1517 when the Battle of Torran Dubh is supposed to have taken place. Angus Mackay says that the Battle of Torran Dubh was actually fought by the Clan Mackay against the Murrays, Clan Ross and Clan Gunn, and not against the family of Sutherland. According to historian Angus Mackay a few months after the battle another skirmish took place upon the borders of Ross in the parish of Rogart in which on one side William Mackay, chieftain of the Mackay of Aberach branch of clan was killed as was his brother Donald, and on the other side was killed John Murray of Aberscross. Shortly after this the Mackays burned the town of Pitfure in Strathfleet, Rogart. However, this was immediately followed by a bond of friendship between the Mackays and Adam Gordon, Earl of Sutherland dated 16 August 1518, in which Mackay renewed the bond that his father had made with the Gordon Earl of Sutherland before him. Angus Mackay states that historian Sir Robert Gordon incorrectly refers to these skirmishes as "defeats" for the Mackays, and that Gordon also fails to mention that the Mackays rounded the year off by securing a title to the lands in the said parish of Rogart as confirmed by the Reay Papers. Angus Mackay also disputes Sir Robert Gordon's account that in 1522, Alexander Gordon, Master of Sutherland overthrew John Mackay of Strathnaver at Lairg and that Mackay then submitted himself to Gordon, the Earl of Sutherland. Angus Mackay explains that Earl Adam, resigning the earldom into his son Alexander's hands was simply renewing the bond of friendship that he had made with Mackay in 1518 this time with his son Alexander.

== The Bishop of Caithness ==
In 1529, while visiting Inverness, William Sutherland, 6th of Duffus was murdered by a servant of Andrew Stuart, Bishop of Caithness at the instigation of the bishop. The Gordon Earls of Huntly and Sutherland took the side of the bishop, saving him from the gallows, while John Mackay of Strathnaver took the side of Sutherland of Duffus. Mackay marched with a body of men towards the bishop's Skibo Castle, but he became sick during the expedition and was carried home to die almost immediately.

== Family ==
John Mackay, 11th of Strathnaver, married Margaret, daughter of Thomas Fraser, 2nd Lord Lovat, who succeeded as chief of the Clan Fraser of Lovat in 1501. John Mackay and Margaret Fraser had the following children:

1. A daughter, who married Hugh Murray of Aberscross, and to whom she had a son called Hugh who was heir to his father Hugh Moray (Murray), and also grandson and one of the heirs of John Mackay of Strathnaver, as confirmed in a charter recorded by William Sutherland, 9th of Duffus dated 21 February 1581.
2. A daughter, who married the Laird of Pulrossie.

John Mackay, 11th of Strathnaver, was succeeded by his brother, Donald Mackay, 11th of Strathnaver.

== See also ==
- Clan Mackay
- Chiefs of Clan Mackay
- Earl of Sutherland
- Bishop of Caithness
