= Battle of Allt Camhna =

1586 Scottish clan battle

- Part of the Scottish clan wars
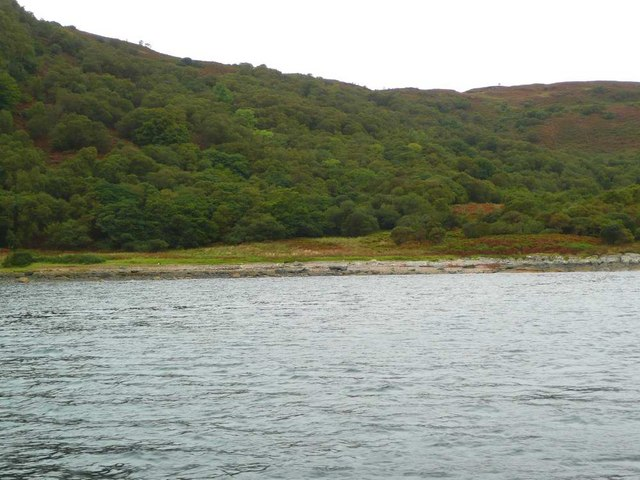
- Allt Camhna
Date	1586
Location	Allt Camhna, Scottish Highlands, Scotland
Result	Mackay/Gunn victory

Belligerents
Clan Mackay; Clan Gunn	Clan Sinclair

Commanders and leaders
William Mackay	Henry Sinclair (KIA)

Strength
Unknown	Unknown

Casualties and losses
Unknown	140 (seven score)

The Battle of Allt Camhna was a Scottish clan battle fought in 1586 between the Clan Gunn and Clan Mackay against the Clan Sinclair.

== Background ==
According to historian Robert Mackay, in 1585 a meeting took place at Elgin, Scotland between George Gordon, 1st Marquess of Huntly, Alexander Gordon, 12th Earl of Sutherland, George Sinclair, 5th Earl of Caithness and Huistean Du Mackay, 13th of Strathnaver. The purpose of the meeting, according to Robert Mackay, was to repair relations which had become damaged between the Earl of Sutherland, Earl of Caithness and Huistean Du Mackay (Hugh Mackay), due to actions by the Clan Gunn and Hugh Mackay in Assynt, both having gone there on the orders of the Earl of Caithness. However, historian Angus Mackay does not state that Hugh Mackay attended this meeting and that the purpose of the meeting was to break up the confederacy between Hugh Mackay and the Earl of Caithness. According to historian Robert Mackay, it was decided at the meeting that the Clan Gunn should be "made away", because they were judged to be the principal authors of these "troubles and commotions", but that both Hugh Mackay and George Sinclair, Earl of Caithness were unwilling to attack their old allies the Clan Gunn and therefore departed from the meeting at Elgin.

In consequence, in 1586, George Gordon, Marquess of Huntly came north to Sutherland, the lands of his cousin, Alexander Gordon, 12th Earl of Sutherland. He sent a message to both Hugh Mackay and George Sinclair, Earl of Caithness to meet him at Sutherland's seat of Dunrobin Castle. According to historian Robert Mackay the Earl of Caithness met with the Gordons of Huntly and Sutherland but Mackay did not and was therefore denounced as a rebel. However, according to historian Angus Mackay, Hugh Mackay did attend this second meeting but refused the proposals of the Gordons of Huntly and Sutherland that the Gunns should be destroyed. However, the Earl of Caithness did indeed agree with the Gordons that the Gunns should be destroyed. Robert Mackay also states that the Earl of Caithness agreed with the Gordon's proposals at this second meeting to attack the Gunns.

== The battle ==
According to historian Robert Mackay, Sinclair, Earl of Caithness sent his men under the command of Henry Sinclair to attack the Gunns. Henry Sinclair being the uncle of the brothers Hugh Mackay (of Strathnaver) and William Mackay (of Bighouse). The Gunns who were informed of these proceedings, gathered their men and were joined by a strong body of men from Mackay's country under William Mackay. On arrival William Mackay proposed that together they should attack the men of Sutherland, but he was overruled by the Gunns who opted to attack the Sinclairs of Caithness instead. Historian Angus Mackay however, gives a different account of how the Mackays under William Mackay came together with the Gunns. Angus Mackay states that the forces of the Earl of Caithness and the Earl of Sutherland pursued the Gunns from Caithness and into the hills of Strathnaver, and at this time a strange coincidence took place: William Mackay (younger brother of Hugh) had raided the MacLeods taking much cattle. As William Mackay was returning home he came across the Earl of Sutherland's men who were searching for the Gunns and a fight took place over the cattle. William Mackay's men fought a rear guard action and the following morning they stumbled across the Gunns who were retiring from the Sinclairs of Caithness. Together the Mackays and Gunns attacked the Sinclairs, defeating them and killing their leader Henry Sinclair, who was a cousin of the Earl of Caithness.

Historian Robert Mackay agrees on the outcome of the battle in that the Mackays and Gunns together defeated the Sinclairs of Caithness, killing their leader Henry Sinclair, but also points out that the historical account of the battle (given below) by Sir Robert Gordon, 1st Baronet, who was himself a younger son of Alexander Gordon, Earl of Sutherland, "says nothing as to his countrymen being at this conflict, perhaps because he is unwilling to admit that they were beaten, - a fact which he never admits; but he, at the same time, leaves room to imply that they were guilty of treachery, which is much worse than a defeat. The day and place were fixed for their meeting the Caithness men, and they did not appear, but allowed those to be cut down by a host which had laid their accounts to have the combined forces of Caithness and Sutherland to contend with".

=== Historical accounts of the battle ===
==== Robert Mackay, quoting Sir Robert Gordon ====
17th-century historian Sir Robert Gordon (1580–1656), who was living at the time of the battle and who was a younger son of Alexander Gordon, 12th Earl of Sutherland, wrote an account of the battle in his book A Genealogical History of the Earldom of Sutherland. However, the first account given below is that of early 19th-century historian Robert Mackay in his book History of the House and Clan of Mackay published in 1829 and quoting from Gordon.

So having the advantage of the hill, they set upon the enemy with a resolute courage. The Caithness-men came short with their first flight of arrows; by contrary, the Guns spared their shot until they came hard to the enemy, which then they bestowed among them to great advantage. In the end the clan Gun overthrew the Caithness-men at Auldgown, upon the borders of Caithness, the year 1586, and killed seven score of their most resolute men, with their captain Henry Sinclair, cousin to the Earl of Caithness, and uncle to Hugh and William Mackay. William Mackay was sore for the slaughter of his uncle, Henry Sinclair, whom he knew not to be there till he was slain; but afterwards in the chase William Mackay spared no man. The Caithness host had been all destroyed, had not the darkness of the night favoured their flight. Hugh Mackay was then in Caithness, with Earl George; but the inhabitants of Caithness understanding that his brother, William Mackay was with the clan Gun at the conflict of Auldgown, they sought for Hugh Mackay to slay him; whereupon he was forced in all haste to flee secretly into Strathnaver, thereby to eschew their present fury.

==== Sir Robert Gordon's original account ====
The following account is that given by Sir Robert Gordon (1580–1656), younger son of Alexander Gordon, 12th Earl of Sutherland, which was actually first published in 1813 in the book A Genealogical History of the Earldom of Sutherland, which itself is based on Gordon's original 17th-century manuscript:

The Earle of Southerland his host converyning spedelie, went on forward to pursue Clangun, according to promise. Bot meitting first, by chance, with Wm. Macky (the brother of Houcheon Macky), accompanied with divers of his cuntriemen of Strathnaver, who had even then taken and careid away James Mack-Rory his cattel out of Corrikean Loch in the Diri-Meanigh (James Mack-Rory being then the Earle of Southerland's depender), they rescued and brought back the booty and cattell. They chased William Macky and the Strathnaver men all that day, and killed one of the principalls of the Clangun in Strathnaver, called Angus-Roy, with sundrie others of William Macky his company. This wes called Claw-tom-Richi, (that is, the day of the hather bush). About the evening, they followed them, in hote chace, even to the merches and bounds of Catteynes, wherethe Clangun had assembled, heiring that the inhabitants of Catteynes wer gathered together, and wer up in armes, and had taken up ther cattell.

In this meantyme, William Macky, with the Strathnaver men, joyned with the Clangun, (whom they met in the hilles by chance); they promised to die and live together, and to participat of eithers fortunes, good or bad. Heirvpon, they perceave the Earle of Catteynes his host in sight of them, which wes conducted by Henrie Sinclair, the Laird of Dun his brother. Then they goe to consultation among themselves whether they suld feight against the Catteynes men, fresh and in breath, attending them, or turn aganest the Southerland men, who were wearied with ther labor the day preceiding. William Macky his opinion wes to invade the Southerland men, alreadie tyred with feighting. Bot the Clangun did choyse rather to hazard against the Catteynes men, which they did, without fear or delay, being far inferior in number. Yit they had in mynd, that nothing wes befor them bot enemies, the deip and bottomles ocean behind them; no place of retrait; no suretie bot valor and victory; so haveing the advantage of the hill, the set upon the enemy with a resolute courage. The Catteynes men came short with ther first flight of arrowes; by the contrarie, the Clangun spared ther shot until they came hard to the enemy, which then they bestowed among them with great advantage. In end, by the speciall help and assistance of the Almightie God, (in whose hands are the hearts of men, and the events of things) the Clangun overthrew the Catteynes men at Aldgown, upon the borders of Catteynes, the yeir of God 1586, and killed seaven score of ther most resolute men, with ther captane, Henrie Sincler, cousin to the Earle of Catteynes, and uncle to Houcheon and William Mckay. The Catteynes host had been all destroyed, had not the darknes of the night favored their flight, withholding the victors from the following chase. William Macky wes sore for the slaughter of his uncle Henry Sinclair, whom he knew not to be their till he was slain; bot afterward in the chase William Macky spared no man. The Southerland men knowing nothing of Clangun, had lost the sight of the Strathnaver men whilst they had them in chase amongst those hills, immediatlie befor this skirmish at Ald-gowne, and so had retired into ther owne countrey to repose themselves with the booty they had recovered; wherby they understood nothing of this skirmish until it wes finished.

This disaster justlie befell the Earle of Catteynes, becaus, that since this overthrow, he hath oppinlie confessed to divers men, that it wes never his intention to pursue the Clangun at that tyme; bot his purpose and policie wes, that they might be hotely and eagerlie pursued, and then he wold releive them from that imminent danger, therby to mak them the more beholding to him and his posteritie in all tyme cumming. Bot the Almightie God did measure him rightlie, and turned his fraud and subtile policie to his own shame, and the destruction of divers of his cuntriemen. Presntlie after the skirmish at Ald-Gowne, the Earle of Catteynes (being careid with a spriite of revenge and furie against the Clangun), hanged John Mack-ean-Mack-rob, chiftane of the Clangun, in Catteynes, whom he had keiped and deteyned in captivity a good whyle, haveing, befor this tyme, trained him into Girngo to speak with him.

Houcheon Macky wes then in Catteynes with Earle George, whose father sister he had mareid. But the inhabitants of Catteynes understanding that his brother, William Macky, wes with the Clangun at the conflict of Ald-Gown, they sought for Houcheon to slay him; wherupon he wes forced, in all hast, to flie secreitlie into Strathnaver, therby to eschew their present furie. Thus thie fell out some variance betuen the inhabitants of Catteynes and Strathnaver for assisting the Clangun; so that, in a maner, as soon as the Southerland men had neir ended ther troubles with Catteynes, and drew to some setleing for a short space, the Strathnaver men, assisted by the Clangun, (as iff ordained to revenge the Southerland men's wrongs one upon another), began to assault the Sinclairs, and the inhabitants of Catteynes, with the lyk afflictions, which I doe ommit to relate particularlie, as apperteyning litle to my subject.

== Aftermath ==
Shortly after the Battle of Allt Camhna the Clan Gunn was defeated at the Battle of Leckmelm in Ross-shire by the Clan MacLeod of Assynt, the Clan Sutherland and the Mackay of Aberach branch of the Clan Mackay.
