= Battle of Alltachuilain =

16th-century Scottish clan war

- Part of the Scottish clan wars
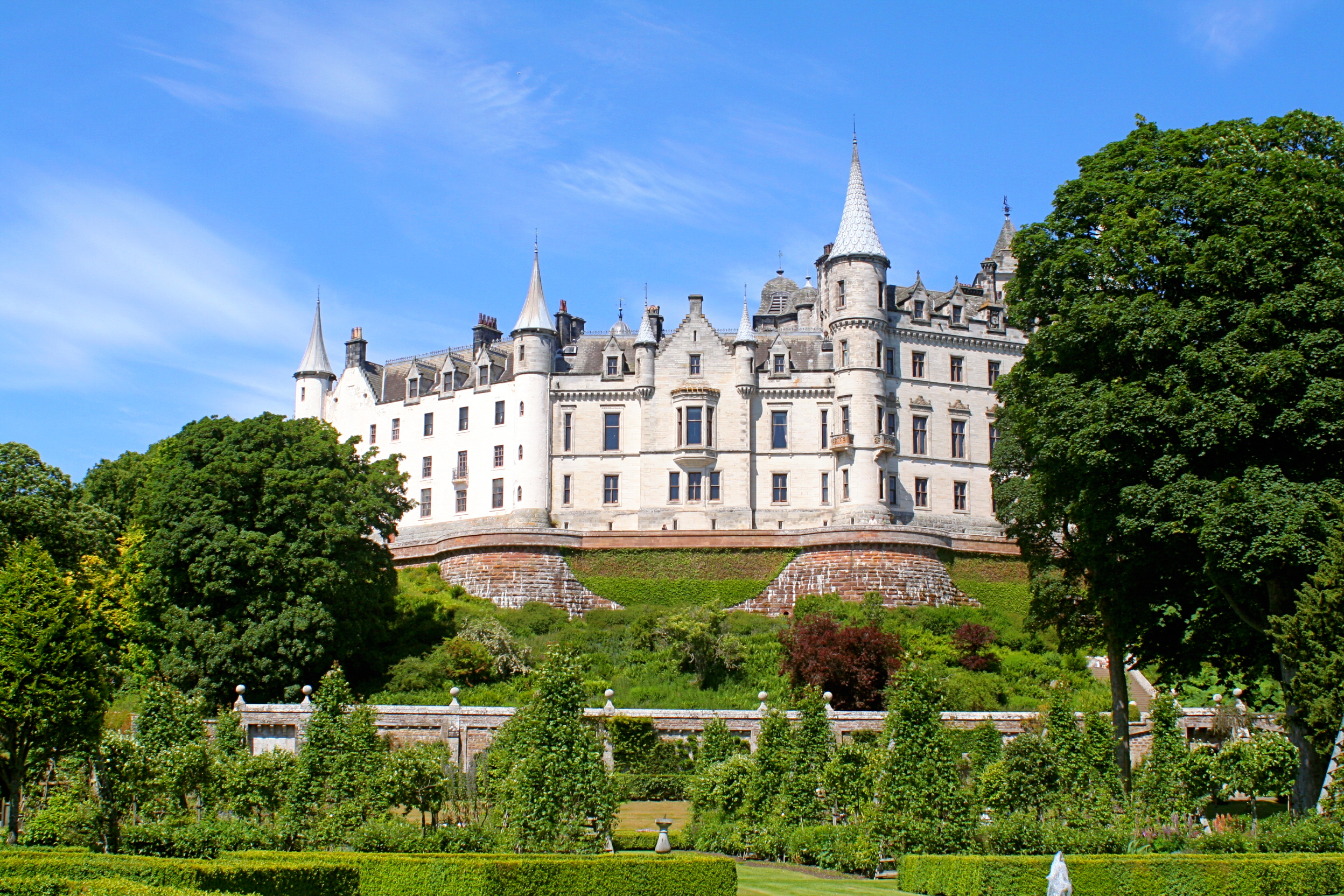
- Dunrobin Castle was besieged by both sides prior to the battle
Date	1518 or 1519
Location	Alltachuilain, parish of Loth, county of Sutherland, Scotland
Result	Victory for forces of Elizabeth Sutherland and Adam Gordon

Belligerents
Clan Sutherland; Clan Gordon (loyal to Elizabeth Sutherland and Adam Gordon)	Clan Sutherland (loyal to Alexander Sutherland)

Commanders and leaders
Alexander Leslie; John Murray	Alexander Sutherland

Strength
Unknown	Unknown

Casualties and losses
Unknown	All either slain or chased

The Battle of Alltachuilain (or Ald-Quhillin was a Scottish clan battle that took place in 1518 or 1519 in the parish of Loth, county of Sutherland, Scotland. It was fought between factions of the Clan Sutherland in a dispute over the Earldom of Sutherland.

== Background ==
John Sutherland, 9th Earl of Sutherland, chief of Clan Sutherland died in 1514 leaving no heir. He was succeeded by his younger sister Elizabeth Sutherland, 10th Countess of Sutherland. Elizabeth married Adam Gordon who was a younger son of George Gordon, 2nd Earl of Huntly, chief of the powerful Clan Gordon. Elizabeth and Adam Gordon’s son, Alexander Gordon, Master of Sutherland, would become the legal heir to the Earldom of Sutherland, however this was disputed by others. Firstly, John Mackay, 11th of Strathnaver, chief of the Clan Mackay rose up in opposition to the Gordons who had taken power in Sutherland. Mackay fought against the forces of Elizabeth Sutherland and Adam Gordon at the Battle of Torran Dubh in 1517 where Mackay was defeated. The Sutherland force had been led by Elizabeth’s younger half-brother Alexander Sutherland, who she had persuaded to resist Mackay. However, shortly afterwards Alexander Sutherland married a sister of John Mackay, and according to one account Mackay tampered with Alexander Sutherland to renew his claim to the Earldom. Alexander Sutherland then claimed the Earldom of Sutherland for himself as the rightful heir.

=== Sieges of Dunrobin Castle ===
According to the Gordon account, Adam Gordon offered Alexander Sutherland reasonable terms and conditions which he refused. The clans and tribes of Sutherland then broke into factions and Alexander Sutherland had won great favour amongst them, having both the support of the Earl of Caithness and John Mackay, whose sister he had recently married. While Adam Gordon was in Strathbogie (now known as Huntly, home of his family the Gordons of Huntly) Alexander Sutherland, with a great company of men, laid siege to Dunrobin Castle the principal seat of the Earls and Countesses of Sutherland, which he eventually succeeded in taking before Adam Gordon had returned.

Adam Gordon then sent a force of his own under Alexander Leslie of Kinninuvy and John Moray of Aberscors to besiege Alexander Sutherland in Dunrobin Castle. The castle surrendered, however by this time Alexander Sutherland had retired into Strathnaver, the land of his brother-in-law John Mackay.

== Battle ==
According to the Gordon account Alexander Sutherland, with a new supply of men invaded Sutherland and killed some of his own Sutherland kinsmen because they supported Adam Gordon. Alexander Sutherland then traveled further into the parishes of Clyne and Loth where, according to the Gordon account he molested the country. Adam Gordon then sent Alexander Leslie and John Moray to "hold the bastard skirmishing" until he came with a larger force. They met with Alexander Sutherland at a place called Alltachuilain or Ald-Quhillin, where there ensued a "hote skirmish". Alexander Sutherland was taken prisoner and all of his men were either slain or chased. He was then executed by Alexander Leslie at the very place where they fought, and his head placed on a spear on the top of Dunrobin Castle.

== Aftermath ==
In the aftermath of the Battle of Alltachuilain, William Sutherland, 6th of Duffus would also claim the Earldom of Sutherland, however he was killed by the Bishop of Caithness in 1530.

Adam Gordon and Elizabeth Sutherland's son, Alexander Gordon became known as the Master of Sutherland, and his son succeeded as John Gordon, 11th Earl of Sutherland.

Of Alexander Sutherland who was executed, his place of residence was known as "Kilphedder." His descendants occupied the lands for generations on payment of a nominal rent to the Earls of Sutherland. The ruins at Kilphedder now are more immediately connected with one of his descendants: William Sutherland of Kilphedder was a man of gigantic strength and stature who repaired and extended the residence of his ancestors.

== See also ==
- Earl of Sutherland
