= Elizabeth Sutherland =

Elizabeth Sutherland may refer to:

- Elizabeth Leveson-Gower, Duchess of Sutherland, née Elizabeth Sutherland, (1765–1839), British peeress
- Elizabeth Sutherland, 24th Countess of Sutherland (1921–2019), British peeress
- Elizabeth Sutherland, 10th Countess of Sutherland (died 1535)
