= Sutherland of Forse =

Scottish noble family

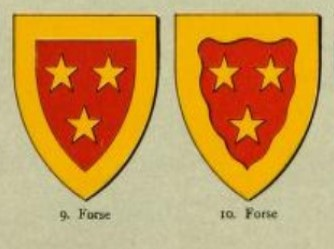
Coats of arms of the noble Scottish family of Sutherland of Forse

The Sutherlands of Forse were a minor Scottish noble family. Kenneth Sutherland, 1st of Forse was the second son of William de Moravia, 5th Earl of Sutherland. They were a cadet branch of the Clan Sutherland.

The Sutherland Lairds of Forse were seated at Forse Castle on the east coast of the county of Caithness. They lived there until about the year 1660. They later built a mansion house about a mile inland. This was demolished and replaced with a greater mansion house called "Forse House" which the Lairds of Forse occupied until 1905 and has since been used as a hotel and nursing home.

In the early 16th century the Earldom of Sutherland passed through a female heiress to the Gordon family. Later, during the late 16th century the Sutherland Lairds of Forse supported the Earl of Caithness in a feud against the Gordon family who had taken over as Earls of Sutherland, and Nicolas Sutherland, brother of the Laird of Forse was killed at the Battle of Clynetradwell in 1590.

John Sutherland of Forse was a captain in Loudon's Highlanders regiment during the Jacobite rising of 1745.

Upon the death of William Gordon, 18th Earl of Sutherland in 1766, George Sutherland of Forse made a claim for the Earldom, based on his descent from William, 5th Earl of Sutherland who died in 1370. However, the House of Lords found the case in favour of Elizabeth, only surviving daughter of the 18th Earl. The last Sutherland Laird of Forse in the direct line died in 1909, leaving two daughters but no son.

== Lairds of Forse ==
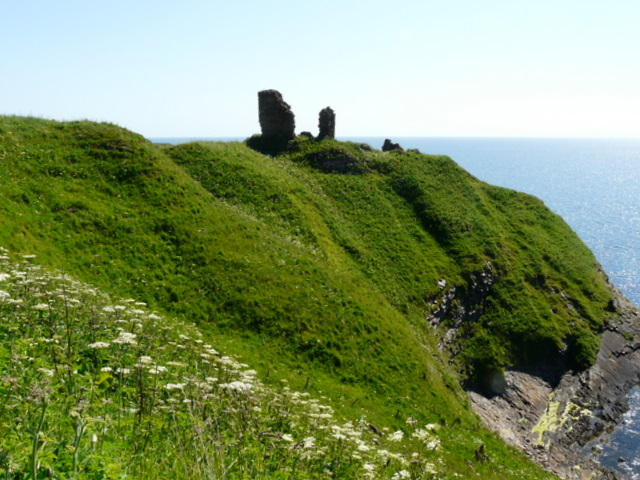
The ruins of Forse Castle, seat of the Sutherlands of Forse until 1660.

- Kenneth Sutherland, 1st Laird of Forse (third son of William, 5th Earl of Sutherland d. 1370).
- John Sutherland, 2nd of Forse.
- Richard Sutherland, 3rd of Forse.
- John Sutherland, 4th of Forse.
- Robert Sutherland (died before his father but left three sons).
- Richard Sutherland, 5th of Forse.
- William Sutherland, 6th of Forse. (d. 1564) (younger brother of 5th Laird)
- Alexander Sutherland 7th of Forse. (younger brother of 6th Laird)
- Donald Sutherland, 8th of Forse.
- Alexander Sutherland, 9th of Forse. (d. c. 1645)
- James Sutherland, 10th of Forse. (d. c. 1655)
- George Sutherland, 11th of Forse.
- George Sutherland, 12th of Forse.
- John Sutherland, 13th of Forse. (Second son the 12th Laird).
- George Sutherland, 14th of Forse. (d. 1773)
- John Campbell Sutherland, 15th of Forse. (d. 1828) (Younger brother of the 14th Laird).
- John Sutherland, 16th of Forse. (d. 1846)
- George Sutherland, 17th of Forse. (Younger brother of the 16th Laird).
- John William Sutherland, 18th of Forse. (d. 1909)

== See also ==
- Sutherland of Killipheder
- Lord Duffus
