= Forse Castle =

- Near Caithness, Highland, Scotland
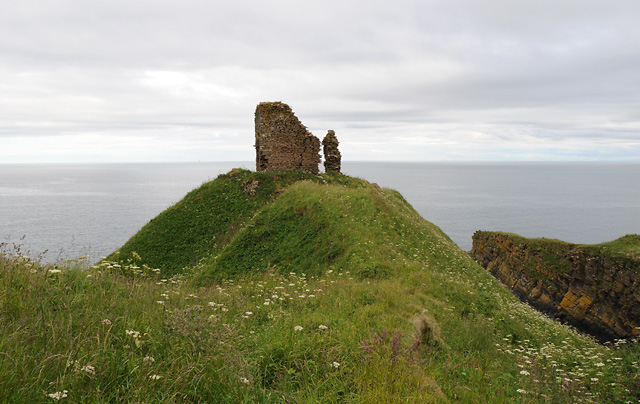
- The remains of Forse Castle, dating from around 1200

Site information
- Open to the public: Yes
- Condition: Ruined

Location
- Coordinates: 58.285°N 3.325°W

Scheduled monument
- Official name: Forse Castle
- Type: Secular: castle
- Designated: 13 May 1939
- Reference no.: SM621

Forse Castle is a ruined building dating from 1200 in the hamlet of Forse in the Caithness region in the Scottish council area of Highland. It is protected as a scheduled monument.

The castle stands on a peninsula about 50 metres above sea level. It is surrounded on all sides by steep rocks and is cut off from the mainland by a natural ditch at the neck of the peninsula.

Forse Castle was the stronghold of the Sutherland of Forse family, a cadet branch of the Clan Sutherland. They lived in it until around 1600.

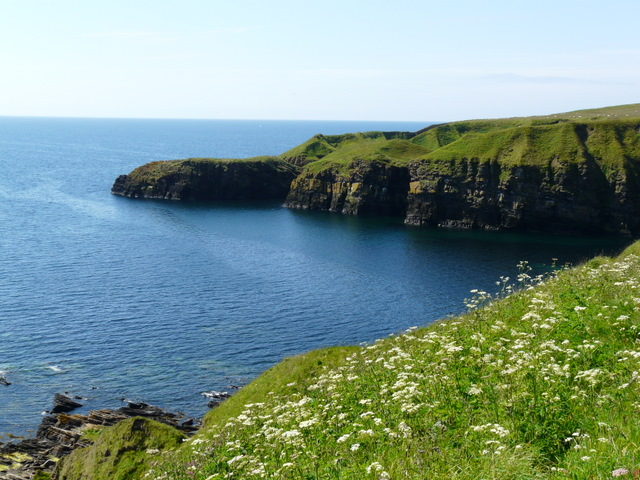
Shoreline near Forse Castle
