= Battle of Leckmelm =

Scottish clan battle that took place in 1586, in the Scottish Highlands

- Part of the Scottish clan wars
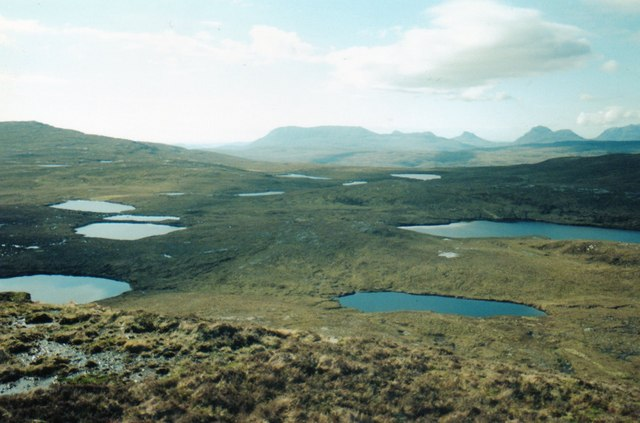
- Leckmelm
Date	1586
Location	Leckmelm, Scottish Highlands, Scotland 57.869°N 5.0939°W
Result	Mackay, Sutherland & MacLeod victory

Belligerents
Clan Gunn	Clan Aberach; Clan Sutherland; Clan MacLeod of Lewis

Commanders and leaders
George Gunn	Niel Mackay; William Sutherland; James MacLeod

Strength
Unknown	Unknown

Casualties and losses
32 killed	Unknown

The Battle of Leckmelm was a Scottish clan battle that took place in 1586, in the Scottish Highlands. It was fought between the Clan Gunn against the Clan Sutherland, Mackays of Aberach and the MacLeods of Assynt.

== Background ==
The Battle of Leckmelm was fought shortly after the Battle of Allt Camhna had taken place where the Clan Gunn, supported by men of the Clan Mackay had defeated the Clan Sinclair from Caithness. Another branch of the Clan Mackay, the Mackays of Aberach were enemies of the Gunns at this time and fought against them at Leckmelm.

== Battle ==
An account of the Battle of Leckmelm is written in the 1829 book History of the House and Clan of the Mackay by Robert Mackay, quoting from 17th-century historian Sir Robert Gordon, 1st Baronet:

In consequence of this defeat at Allt Camhna, Lord Caithness was exasperated against the Guns, and Hugh MacKay withdrew from them his support. Caithness and Sutherland, with their forces, met at Bengrime in Sutherland, along with Sir Patrick Gordon of Achindown, who was sent north by Huntly, with a determinate resolution to exterminate them. This service was now laid upon Sutherland, as his men had not come forward at the late conflict. The Sutherland-men, under command of William Sutherland, grandson of Alexander the heir, were joined by Niel MacKay and his clan, together with James Macleod, chieften of the Slight-ean-Voir and the MacLeods of his tribe. The Guns took the alarm, and fled towards the Western Isles; "but as they were on their journey thither, James Mack-Rory (Macleod) and Niel Mack-ean-Mack-William (Mackay of Aberach), rencountered with them at Lochbroom, at place called Leckmelm, where after a sharp skirmish, the clan Gun were overthrown, and most part of their company slain."

== Aftermath ==
George Gunn who was the Captain of the Gunns escaped by swimming a nearby loch, but was wounded and later captured. He was handed over to the Earl of Caithness but later released, and the scattered remains of his clan found their way back to their ancestral lands. Mackay restored the Gunns to their holdings in Strathnaver, but eight years later James Sinclair of Murkle invaded the Strathy Gunns and killed some of them in revenge for his brother's death.
