= John Gordon, 11th Earl of Sutherland =

Scottish magnate

John Gordon, 11th Earl of Sutherland (1525–1567) was a Scottish magnate. John Gordon supported the chief of his family, his cousin the Earl of Huntly against the Earl of Moray. After Huntly's defeat at Corrichie, he went into exile, and shortly after his return to Scotland he was murdered by a kinswoman.

== Minority ==
John Gordon was the son of Alexander Gordon, Master of Sutherland and Lady Janet Stewart. His father Alexander was the son of Lady Elizabeth Sutherland, 10th Countess of Sutherland (sister of John Sutherland, 9th Earl of Sutherland) and Adam Gordon, younger son of George Gordon, 2nd Earl of Huntly. His mother Janet was the daughter of John Stewart, 2nd Earl of Atholl and Janet Campbell. Elizabeth Sutherland and her husband Adam quashed a rival claimant to the earldom of Sutherland in 1518, at the Battle of Alltachuilain.

Alexander Gordon was made Earl of Sutherland in December 1527, when his mother, the Countess Elizabeth Sutherland, resigned her rights. Alexander died in 1530, and Lady Janet Stewart married Hugh Kennedy of Girvanmains, and subsequently, Henry Stewart, 1st Lord Methven.

John, although still a minor, attended the Parliament of Scotland, in December 1543, which rejected the Treaty of Greenwich. Some time after May 1544, John married Lady Elizabeth Campbell, daughter of Colin Campbell, 3rd Earl of Argyll. She was the Countess of Moray, being the widow of James Stewart, Earl of Moray, who was the son of King James IV of Scotland by his mistress, Janet Kennedy.

On 4 May 1546, John was formally made Earl of Sutherland. In the following year, he commanded part of the rear guard at the Battle of Pinkie Cleugh.

His wife Elizabeth died in 1547, and in 1548, John married, as his second wife, Lady Helen Stewart, who had previously been married to William Hay, 6th Earl of Erroll. She was the daughter of John Stewart, 3rd Earl of Lennox. Her sister, Lady Elizabeth Stewart, had an illegitimate son with King James V of Scotland known as Adam Stewart, Prior of Perth Charterhouse.

In December 1554, Alexander Sutherland, 8th of Duffus, while still a minor, was invested under dispensation from John Gordon, 11th Earl of Sutherland as overlord of the lands of Skelbo and Invershin. The lands of Skelbo, Invershin, Proncy, Torboll and all of the other lands that belonged to Sutherland of Duffus in Sutherland, were erected into a barony by the Earl of Sutherland on 7 November 1562, that was called the barony of Skelbo, to be held by Sutherland of Duffus and his heirs.

== Regency of Mary of Guise ==
In the Autumn of 1554 Mary of Guise paid for a ship, troops and a cannon to be used by John, 11th Earl of Sutherland and his step-brother Hugh Kennedy of Girvanmains to arrest Iye du Mackay, chief of the Clan Mackay, who had caused mischief in Sutherland. They sailed in the Lion and captured Borve Castle, Sutherland. Kennedy subsequently captured Iye Mackay and brought him to Edinburgh.

== Exile, return, and death ==
In September 1561 Sutherland was able to advance negotiations for the marriage of Mary, Queen of Scots with wife's nephew, Lord Darnley. He introduced Darnley's tutor Arthur Lallart or Lilliard to Mary at Stirling Castle.

In September 1562, Mary, Queen of Scots and her half-brother James Stewart newly made Earl of Moray came north to Inverness and Aberdeen. Their discussions with John's cousin the Earl of Huntly led to armed conflict. After the battle of Corrichie, secret letters between John Gordon and the Earl of Huntly were discovered. John Gordon fled to Louvain in Flanders. At the Parliament of Scotland on 28 May 1563, in the presence of Queen Mary, Huntly and Sutherland were forfeited. In 1565 Queen Mary of Scotland restored the Earls of Huntly, Sutherland and others of the name Gordon who had been forfeited.

The Earl of Sutherland was invited to return to Scotland. The Earl of Bedford, Governor of Berwick on Tweed sent a privateer called Wilson who carried Swedish letters of marque to intercept his ship, and the Earl was imprisoned at Berwick. Sutherland was considered a danger to English policy in Scotland. Mary, Queen of Scots, demanded the release of the Earl, who was now sick with an ague. Bedford wrote to Elizabeth on his behalf. The Earl was released after the assurance that he was reconciled with the Earl of Moray.

On his return to Scotland, Sutherland married Marie Seton, daughter of Lord Seton. Both were poisoned at Helmsdale Castle by Isobel Sinclair, and died at Dunrobin Castle on 23 June 1567. Isobel Sinclair, the Earl's aunt, poisoned them in an attempt to make her own son Earl. She also tried to poison Alexander, the Earl's heir, but the cup of poison was drunk by her own son, who died two days later, so Alexander survived. Isobel Sinclair died before her execution, possibly by poisoning herself. George Sinclair, 4th Earl of Caithness may have been behind the plot because he envied the Sutherland earldom.

Peerage of Scotland
| Preceded by Elizabeth Sutherland | Earl of Sutherland; 1535–1567 | Succeeded by Alexander Gordon |
