= Leckmelm =

Coordinates: 57.8673°N 5.0946°W

Leckmelm: Scottish Gaelic: Leac Mailm
- Location within the Ross and Cromarty area
- OS grid reference: NH1690
- Council area: Highland
- Country: Scotland
- Sovereign state: United Kingdom
- Postcode district: IV23 2
- Police: Scotland
- Fire: Scottish
- Ambulance: Scottish

Leckmelm (Scottish Gaelic: Leac Mailm) is a small settlement on the eastern shore of Loch Broom, in Wester Ross in the Highland council area of Scotland. It is about 5 km (3 miles) southeast of Ullapool, along the A835 road.

The Battle of Leckmelm took place in the area in 1586. In the 1870s Leckmelm was extensively cleared during the Highland Clearances (Scottish Gaelic: Fuadaichean nan Gàidheal [ˈfuət̪ɪçən nəŋ ˈɡɛː.əl̪ˠ], the "eviction of the Gaels") consequently the eviction of tenants at Leckmelm was examined in the proceedings of the Napier Commission

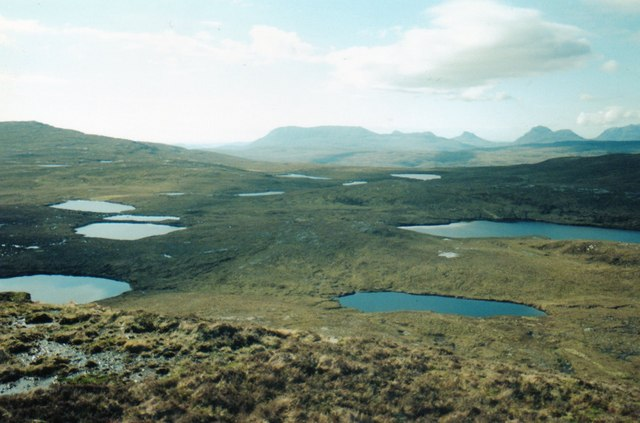
A view of lochs outside Leckmelm
