= Clan Gunn =

Highland Scottish clan

- Na Guinnich
- Motto: Aut pax aut bellum (Either peace or war)

Profile
- Region: Highlands
- District: Sutherland and Caithness
- Plant badge: Juniper
- Pipe music: Failte na’n Guinnach (The Gunns' Salute)

Chief
- John Gunn of that Ilk
- The Gunn of Gunn
- Historic seat: Gunn's Castle (Clyth Castle)
Septs of Clan Gunn
Gallie, Gaunson, Georgeson, Henderson, Jameson, Jamieson, Johnson, Kean, Keane, Keen, Keene, MacComas, MacCorkill, MacIan, MacKames, Mackeamish, MacKean, MacKeane, MacKeen, MacKeene, MacRob, MacWilliam, Mann, Manson, Nelson, Robson, Sandison, Swann, Swanson, Williamson, Wilson (Note: Most of the Clan Gunn sept names are derived from the names of chief's sons: Johnson, MacIan, Mackean, Kean and Keene all derive from 'son of John'. Further to this James, John, Henry, Rob and Will were all sons of the same chief George Gunn of the 15th century.) (Note: The Clan Gunn Society Membership list gives no less than 77 names "recognised as being associated with Clan Gunn" but the list given in Frank Adam's "The Clans, Septs and Regiments of the Scottish Highlands". Revised by Sir Thomas lnnes of Learney is much shorter. This is the list the Chief and Council recognise)
Clan branches
MacHamish Gunns (chiefs)
Robson Gunns or Gunns of Braemore
Bregaul Gunns
Hendersons of Caithness
Allied clans
Clan Sutherland
Clan Mackay (18th century)
Rival clans
Clan Mackay (15th & 16th century)
Clan Keith (from 1478 to 1978)

A flag outside the Clan Gunn Heritage Centre, bearing the crest badge suitable for clan members

Clan Gunn (Scottish Gaelic: Na Guinnich) is a Scottish clan of the Highlands. It is associated with lands in northeastern Scotland, including Caithness, Sutherland and, arguably, the Orkney Isles. Clan Gunn is one of the oldest Scottish clans, being descended from the Norse Jarls of Orkney and the Pictish Mormaers of Caithness.

== History ==
=== Origins ===
==== Traditional origins ====
The traditional origin of the Clan Gunn is that the progenitor of the clan was one Gunni who came to Caithness at the end of the 12th century when his wife, Ragnhild, inherited the estates from her brother, Harald Maddadsson who was the Earl of Orkney. His wife descended from St Ragnvald, who was the founder of the St Magnus Cathedral in Kirkwall, Orkney. Gunni, whose name meant war, was allegedly descended from Viking adventurers and his grandfather was Sweyn who was killed in a raid on Dublin in 1171. Smibert, however, states that the Gunns were of Gaelic origin. Further information on the Norse origins of Clan Gunn can be found in an article written by Michael James Gunn, quoting Sir Robert Gordon's A Genealogical History of The Earldom of Sutherland from the 17th century: "Sir Robert Gordon, in researching genealogies for his work interviewed many of the heads of families in Sutherland, among them Alexander Gun of Kilearnan and Navidale, 4th Mackeamish, who died in 1655. From him he learned that Mackeamish's family are called Clan-Gun from one called Gun, whom they allege to have been the king of Denmarke his sone, and came many dayes agoe from Denmark, and settled himself in Catteynes. The significance of this statement is made clear when it is remembered that, in Sir Robert Gordon's time, the kingdoms of Denmark and Norway were united under the Danish crown. However, the ancient Gaelic sennachies described the Gunns as Lochlannaich, or Norwegians, not Danes, because at the time of their forebear's arrival in Orkney and Caithness, Norway was a separate kingdom and not united with Denmark until the Union of Kalmar in 1391.

==== Recorded origins ====
The first 'chief' of the Clan Gunn to appear in historical records definitively was George Gunn, who was the crouner or coroner of Caithness during the 15th century. The later Celtic patronymic of the Gunn chiefs may have been MacSheumais Chataich, however 'George' Gunn was widely known as Am Braisdeach Mor which means the great brooch-wearer. This was due to the insignia that was worn by him as coroner. George is said to have held court at his Clyth Castle in such splendor that it would rival any Highland chief.

=== 15th century and clan conflicts ===
The Battle of Harpsdale was fought in 1426 where the Clan Gunn fought an inconclusive battle with the Clan Mackay.

The Gunn's traditional enemies were the Clan Keith, who from their Ackergill Castle, challenged the Gunn chiefs for both political needs and for land. In one such feud it was claimed that Dugald Keith coveted Helen, daughter of Gunn of Braemor. The girl resisted Keith's advances but on learning that she was to be married to another man, he surrounded her father's house, slew many of the inhabitants and carried the girl to Ackergill Castle where she threw herself from the tower, rather than submitting to her kidnapper. The Gunns retaliated and repeatedly raided the Keith's territory; however, they suffered defeat in 1438 or 1464 at the Battle of Tannach. Both sides having suffered considerable losses agreed to meet and settle their differences in what is known as the Battle of Champions, where each side was to bring twelve horses. However, the Keiths arrived with two warriors on each horse and slaughtered the outnumbered Gunns. This was in turn avenged by the chief's remaining son James who killed Keith of Ackergill and his son at Drummoy.

=== 16th century and clan conflicts ===
In 1517 the Clan Gunn supported the Clan Sutherland in defeating the Clan Mackay at the Battle of Torran Dubh.

Alistair Gunn, son of John Robson Gunn, had become a man of much note and power in the North. He had married the daughter of John Gordon, 11th Earl of Sutherland and for this reason "he felt entitled to hold his head high amongst the best in Scotland". His pride, or perhaps his loyalty to the Earl of Sutherland, led to his undoing when in 1562, he led Gordon's retinue and encountered James Stewart, 1st Earl of Moray, and his followers on the High Street of Aberdeen. The Earl of Moray was the bastard half-brother of Mary, Queen of Scots, as well as the son-in-law of William Keith, 4th Earl Marischal, chief of Clan Keith. It was the custom at the time to yield thoroughfares to the personage of greater rank, and in refusing to yield the middle of the street to Stewart and his train, Alistair publicly insulted the Earl. Stewart soon afterward had him pursued to a place called Delvines, near Nairn. There he was captured by Andrew Munro of Milntown and taken to Inverness, and following a mock trial, he was executed.

In the late 16th century the Gunns were involved in a number of feuds against the Earl of Sutherland and Earl of Caithness. In 1586 at the Battle of Allt Camhna the Clan Gunn was victorious but they were defeated shortly afterward by a massive force at the Battle of Leckmelm.

=== 17th century and Civil War ===
During the 17th century the Clan Gunn strengthened their links with the Clan Mackay when Gunn of Kilearnan married Mary Mackay, sister of Lord Reay, chief of Clan Mackay. The next Gunn chief married Lord Reay's daughter.

Another branch of the clan, the Gunns of Bramore, who descend from Robert, a younger son of Am Braisdeach Mor, were generally known as the Robson Gunns. Sir William Gunn, brother of the Robson chief, despite being Catholic, served in the army of the Protestant king of Sweden, and rose to command a battalion. He later fought for Charles I and received a knighthood in 1639. He later returned to the Continent where he served the Holy Roman Empire and married a German baroness. He became an imperial general and was created baron of the Holy Roman Empire in 1649.

=== 18th century and Jacobite uprisings ===
The Gunns as a Clan did not support the Stuarts and fought for the British Government during the Jacobite rising of 1745. Alexander Gunn, chief of the Clan Gunn, was a Captain of an Independent Highland Company that fought for the British Government.

Gunns did independently fight for the Bonnie Prince and a list can be found in the publication No Quarter Given, the muster roll of Prince Charles Edward Stuart's Army 1745–46.

Gunns were heavily drawn upon for the 79th Queen's Own Cameron Highlanders regiment during the French revolutionary and Napoleonic wars.

== Chieftainship ==
The current Chief of Clan Gunn is Chief John Gunn of Gunn, who succeeded his father Chief Iain Gunn of Gunn who passed in October 2024.

Previously, on 25 September 2015, the Lord Lyon King of Arms for Scotland issued an interlocutor recognizing Iain Alexander Gunn of Banniskirk as Chief of Clan Gunn, so that he became Iain Gunn of that Ilk, Chief of Clan Gunn. At a Family Convention, held in Orkney on 18 July 2015, a petition to the Lyon Court requesting this recognition had been approved and sent to the Lyon for action. For the first time in 230 years the Clan had a recognized Chief. Iain had previously served as Commander of Clan Gunn for over forty-three years. Iain Gunn of Gunn died on 9 October 2024. As mention he was succeeded by his son John Gunn of Gunn.

=== Commanders ===
Iain Alexander Gunn of Banniskirk was appointed the second Commander of Clan Gunn, by commission of Lord Lyon on 9 June 1972. He was Secretary of the Clan Gunn UK Society on its establishment in 1961. The first Commander was his paternal uncle, William Gunn of Banniskirk, who held the title from 1967 to 1968.

In 1978, the previous Chief of Clan Keith and the then Commander of Clan Gunn signed a peace treaty at the site of the Chapel of St. Tayrs, ending the feud between the two clans which began in 1478.

== Castles ==
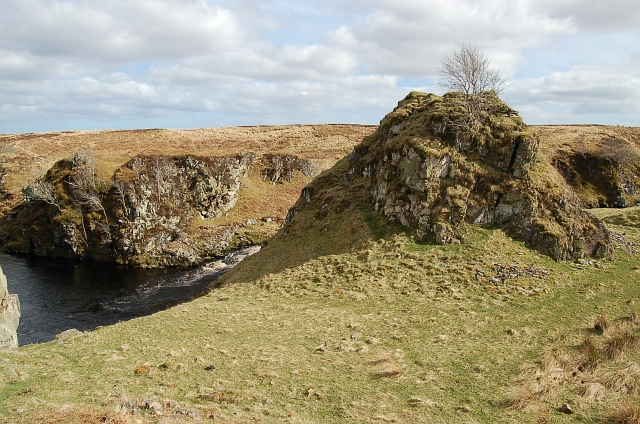
The remains of Dirlot Castle

- Gunn's Castle also known as Clyth Castle was situated on a rock above the sea, eight miles south-west of Wick, Caithness. It was once a splendid and strong castle but virtually nothing remains. The fortress was held by the Gunns during their feud with the Clan Keith.
- Dirlot Castle near Watten, Caithness was originally held by the Cheynes but passed to the Gunns in the 15th century. However, later it went to the Clan Sutherland and then the Clan Mackay.
- Halberry Castle near Wick, Caithness was held by the Gunns but there are now only some remains by the sea.
- Latheron Castle near Dunbeath, Caithness, was held by the Gunns but passed to the Clan Sinclair in the 17th century and there are only slight remains left of the castle. Latheron House dates from the 18th century.
- Kinbrace, site of castle once held by the Gunns, although the location is not certain.

== Tartan ==
Clan Gunn Tartan
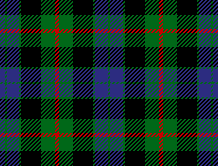
- The Clan Gunn tartan in Modern colors.

Sett

Tartan registries
- STA: #708
- STWR: #708
- SRT entry: Clan Gunn

The Gunn tartan is found in 'weathered', 'ancient', 'muted', and 'modern' colourings. An example of the tartan can be seen here.

The Gunn tartan as shown in the Scottish Register of Tartans

Clanngvn tartan, as published in 1842 in Vestiarium Scoticum
