= George Gordon, 2nd Earl of Huntly =

Scottish nobleman and Chancellor of Scotland

- Born: before 1441
- Died: 8 June 1501; Stirling Castle
- Noble family: Clan Gordon; Clan Seton
- Spouses: Elizabeth Dunbar; Annabella of Scotland; Elizabeth Hay
- Issue: Alexander Gordon, 3rd Earl of Huntly; Isabella Gordon; Lady Catherine Gordon
- Father: Alexander Gordon, 1st Earl of Huntly
- Mother: Elizabeth Crichton

George Gordon, 2nd Earl of Huntly (died 8 June 1501) was a Scottish nobleman and Chancellor of Scotland from 1498 to 1501.

== Life ==
George was the son of Alexander (Seton) Gordon, 1st Earl of Huntly and his second wife Elizabeth Crichton, daughter of William Crichton, 1st Lord Crichton. George is first mentioned by name in 1441 when the lands which later became part of the Earldom were settled on him and his heirs. George was almost certainly born shortly before this time, c. 1441 as his parents married before 18 March 1439–40.

In his contract with Elizabeth Dunbar, Countess of Moray, dated 20 May 1455 he is styled the Master of Huntley. He is addressed as "Sir George Seton, knight", in a royal precept dated 7 March 1456–7, and in a crown charter dated a year later he uses the name of Gordon for the first time, indicating he had assumed that surname. As George, Lord Gordon, he was keeper of the castles of Kildrummy, Kindrochat and Inverness. He succeeded his father as Earl of Huntly c. 15 July 1470.

Shortly after becoming Earl of Huntly he was involved with the Earl of Ross in a private war in which the king, James III of Scotland, interceded. Ross was charged with treason, but after refusing a summons from the king, was outlawed. One of the expeditions sent against the errant Earl of Ross was led by Alexander. After he captured Dingwall Castle and pressed his army into Lochaber, Ross relented and sought pardon for his actions from the king. In 1479 he was justiciary north of the River Forth, one of his primary duties was the suppression of feuds between Highland clans. In 1497 George Gordon was appointed High Chancellor of Scotland, the honour probably bestowed at the same time as his daughter Catherine married Perkin Warbeck, an adventurer in favour with King James IV of Scotland. George was Chancellor until 1500. George, the second earl, died at Stirling Castle on 8 June 1501.

== Family ==
On 20 May 1455, George Gordon was married by contract to Lady Elizabeth Dunbar, daughter of James Dunbar, 7th Earl of Moray. The marriage was annulled due to affinity, before March 1459–60; the couple had no children.

George secondly married, before March 1459–60, Princess Annabella of Scotland, youngest daughter of King James I of Scotland and Joan Beaufort (the granddaughter of John of Gaunt). After several years of marriage, the Earl of Gordon instituted proceedings to have this marriage annulled as well, on the grounds that Princess Annabella was related in the third and fourth degrees of consanguinity to his first wife, Elizabeth Dunbar, and the marriage was dissolved on 24 July 1471.

George Gordon had a number of children, but with few exceptions, there remains no clear consensus as to which child was of the second marriage and which was of the third:

- Lady Isabella Gordon (d. 1485), wife of William Hay, 3rd Earl of Erroll (d. 1507).
- Alexander Gordon, 3rd Earl of Huntly (died 21 January 1523/24) (Note: There has been some uncertainty regarding Alexander's mother, whether she was Annabella Stewart or Elizabeth Hay. But the fact that his father married Elizabeth Hay after 18 August 1471 [CP, vi, 677 & n. b.] and that Alexander himself was a member of parliament, as well as being one of the Lords of the Articles in 1485, makes it chronologically implausible he could have been Elizabeth Hay's son; meaning most probably his mother was Annabella Stewart. See: SP, IV, 529, 532; CP, VI, 677 n. f.)
- Adam Gordon, who married Lady Elizabeth Sutherland, daughter and heir of John Sutherland, 8th Earl of Sutherland, and in her right became Countess of Sutherland after her brother's death. Their son was Alexander Gordon, Master of Sutherland.
- William Gordon, who married Janet Ogilvy and was the ancestor of the Gordons of Gight, from whom Lord Byron was a descendant.
- James Gordon, mentioned in an entail in 1498.
- Lady Janet Gordon, who married firstly, Alexander Lindsay, Master of Crawford (d. 16 Sep 1489); secondly, Patrick, Master of Gray (annulled) (d.1541); thirdly, Patrick Buttar of Gormark; and fourthly, James Halkerston of Southwood. She died before February 1559.
- Lady Elizabeth Gordon, mother was Annabella, who was contracted to marry William Keith, 3rd Earl Marischal, in 1481.

George obtained an annulment from his second marriage on 24 July 1471. He then married, thirdly, his mistress, Lady Elizabeth Hay, daughter of William Hay, 1st Earl of Erroll, and swore a solemn oath to have no 'actual delen' with the lady until after they were married. He married Elizabeth Hay on 12 May 1476, and they had the following children:

- Lady Catherine Gordon (died October 1537), probably a daughter of Elizabeth Hay, she married firstly, Perkin Warbeck (d. 1499), notorious for claiming to be Richard of Shrewsbury, 1st Duke of York, one of the young princes who disappeared from history in the Tower of London; she married secondly, James Strangeways of Fyfield (d. 1515); she married thirdly, Matthew Cradock of Swansea (d. 1531); and she married fourthly, Christopher Assheton of Fyfield. She was well received at the court of King Henry VII of England, who styled her "the White Rose." She had no issue by any of her four husbands.
- Lady Eleanor Gordon
- Lady Agnes Gordon

== See also ==
- "Gordon, George (d.1502?)" . Dictionary of National Biography. London: Smith, Elder & Co. 1885–1900.

Peerage of Scotland
Preceded by Alexander Gordon	Earl of Huntly; 1470–1501	Succeeded by Alexander Gordon
Political offices
Preceded by 5th Earl of Angus	Lord Chancellor of Scotland; 1498–1501	Succeeded by Duke of Ross
