= Earl of Sutherland =

Scottish peerage title

Earldom of Sutherland
- Gules, three mullets or, on a bordure of the second a double tressure flory counterflory of the first
- Creation date: 1230
- Created by: Alexander II of Scotland
- Peerage: Peerage of Scotland
- First holder: William de Moravia
- Present holder: Alistair Charles St Clair Sutherland, 25th Earl of Sutherland
- Heir presumptive: Lady Rachel Elizabeth Sutherland, Mistress of Sutherland
- Remainder to: Heirs general of the body of the grantee
- Subsidiary titles: Lord Strathnaver
- Seat: House of Tongue; Dunrobin Castle
- Motto: Sans peur ("Fearless")

Earl of Sutherland is a title in the Peerage of Scotland. It was created circa 1230 for William de Moravia and is the premier earldom in the Peerage of Scotland. The earl or countess of Sutherland is also the chief of Clan Sutherland.

== History ==
The original line of earls of Sutherland had the surname "de Moravia" although they sometimes used the surname "Sutherland", taken from their hereditary title. The name de Moravia meant "of Moray" or "of Murray". The de Moravias who were earls of Sutherland and chiefs of Clan Sutherland, arguably shared their early paternal ancestry with the chiefs of Clan Murray through their shared progenitor Freskin de Moravia. Various branches of the Murray Clan claim descent from Freskin, including those who were earls and later dukes of Atholl. Current research is underway via male-line Y-DNA studies in collaboration with both branches of these clans to determine if any modern branches share an early medieval ancestor. From Robert, 6th Earl (d. 1444) onward the surname Sutherland was used.

Elizabeth Sutherland, 10th Countess of Sutherland (1470–1535) married Adam Gordon, a younger son of George Gordon, 2nd Earl of Huntly, chief of Clan Gordon. Their first son is Alexander Gordon, Master of Sutherland, whose descendants were several of the next earls of Sutherland, who all used the surname Gordon. The title was again held by a long string of men, until the death of William Gordon, 18th earl, without sons, when the title passed to his daughter Elizabeth, 19th Countess of Sutherland (1765–1839).

The 19th Countess of Sutherland then married George Granville Leveson-Gower in 1785; he inherited the title of Marquess of Stafford from his father in 1803. The marquess held vast lands and wealth, having inherited from his father, the first marquess of Stafford, from his maternal uncle, Francis Egerton, 3rd Duke of Bridgewater, and also holding much property associated with the earldom of Sutherland, which belonged to his wife. He was made Duke of Sutherland in 1833.

The duke's son, also named George, inherited the earldom of Sutherland from his mother and the dukedom of Sutherland from his father. The two titles continued united in the Leveson-Gower family until the death of the fifth duke in 1963. The earldom passed to his niece Elizabeth, 24th Countess of Sutherland (1921–2019), while the dukedom had to pass to a male heir and was inherited by John Egerton, 5th Earl of Ellesmere (1915–2000).

The subsidiary title associated with the earldom is Lord Strathnaver (created 1230), which is used as a courtesy title by the earl's or countess's eldest son and heir. (There is no evidence of Sutherland use of this title from 1230 although later on the Gordons adopted it, but it was never formally approved by king or government. The title is disputed by Clan Mackay whose early chiefs are all titled "of Strathnaver" from Iye MacAiodh 1st of Strathnaver (b. about 1210) to at least Sir Donald Mackay who was created as the first Lord Reay in 1628. There is independent evidence of the recognition of this title in reference to "the noble Angus Aodh of Strathnaver" in a charter to Angus by the Lord of the Isles in 1415, in a 1504 'Gift of Non-entry' by James IV: "our lovit Y Mcky in Strathnaver". The title is also implicit in the 1517 bond of friendship between Adam Gordon and Aodh Mackay and then his son John's 1518 renewed bond that refers to John Mackay as "of Strathnaver". Other confirmations are from 1540 in a charter from the Bishop of Caithness : "Donald Mackay of Strathnaver", a 1623 Privy Council commission: "Sir Donald Mackay of Strathnaver".)

The family seat is Dunrobin Castle, near Golspie, Sutherland in Scotland.

== Ancestors of the earls of Sutherland ==
Lozenge-shaped arms of the Countess of Sutherland

Different sources give different accounts of the ancestors of the earls of Sutherland. The generally accepted ancestry is that William de Moravia (William Sutherland), 1st Earl of Sutherland in the peerage of Scotland (died 1248) was the son of Hugh de Moravia, who in turn was a grandson of Freskin, a Flemish knight. William Fraser, writing in the 19th century gives a similar account but states that Hugh was actually the son of Freskin, rather than his grandson. Sir Robert Gordon (1580–1656), the 17th century historian of the House of Sutherland, and a younger son of Alexander Gordon, 12th Earl of Sutherland, stated that William de Moravia (William Sutherland), 1st Earl of Sutherland (died 1248) was the son of Hugh, Earl of Sutherland who was nicknamed Hugh Freskin, who was in turn son of Robert Sutherland (Earl of Sutherland and founder of Dunrobin Castle), who was son of Walter Southerland (Earl of Sutherland), who was son of Alane Southerland, Thane of Sutherland.

== Earls of Sutherland ==
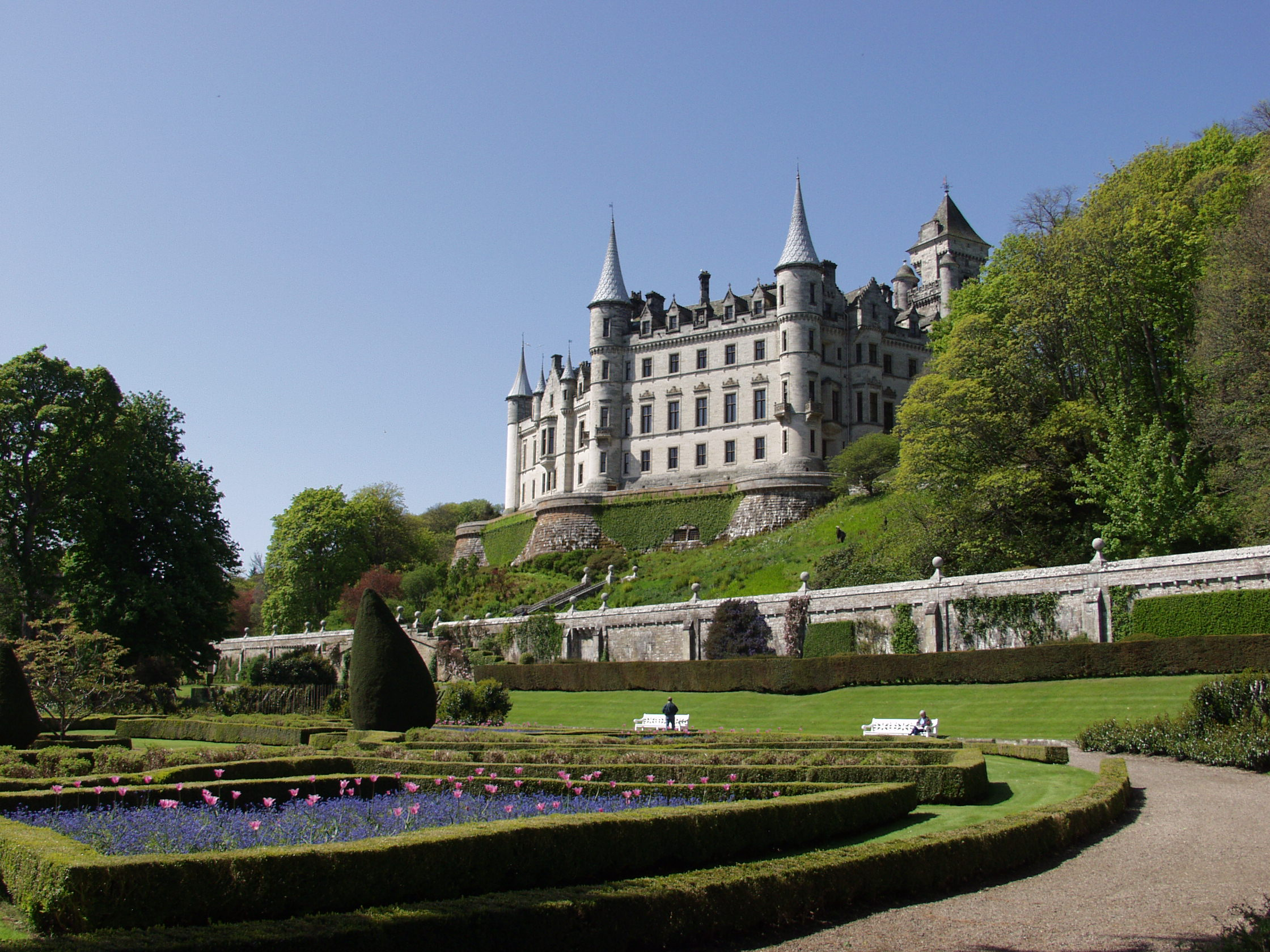
Dunrobin Castle has similar architecture and partly exposed semi-green foundations as some medieval French castles such as Josselin Castle but is of the pan-19th century Scottish Baronial architecture with a formal French garden and is the seat of the Earls or Countesses of Sutherland – a title that passes to eldest female heirs on lack of male heirs.

Although the original line of earls had the surname "de Moravia" in the direct male line, historian Sir Robert Gordon, 1st Baronet, who was a younger son of Alexander Gordon, 12th Earl of Sutherland, states in his book A Genealogical History of the Earldom of Sutherland that the original line in fact used the surname "Sutherland". According to modern historians of the Cambridge University Press, from Robert, 6th Earl onwards they used the surname Sutherland.

- William de Moravia, 1st Earl of Sutherland (William Sutherland) (c. 1210–1248)
- William de Moravia, 2nd Earl of Sutherland (William Sutherland) (c. 1235–1307)
- William de Moravia, 3rd Earl of Sutherland (William Sutherland) (died 1330)
- Kenneth de Moravia, 4th Earl of Sutherland (Kenneth Sutherland) (c. 1270–1333)
- William de Moravia, 5th Earl of Sutherland (William Sutherland) (c. 1312–1370)
- Robert Sutherland, 6th Earl of Sutherland (c. 1350–1444)
- John Sutherland, 7th Earl of Sutherland (c. 1390–1460)
- John Sutherland, 8th Earl of Sutherland (1435–1508)
- John Sutherland, 9th Earl of Sutherland (died 1514)
- Elizabeth Sutherland, 10th Countess of Sutherland (1470–1535) (younger sister of the 9th Earl, she married Adam Gordon, younger son of George Gordon, 2nd Earl of Huntly)
  - Alexander Gordon, Master of Sutherland (son of Elizabeth) (c.1505–1530)
- John Gordon, 11th Earl of Sutherland (c. 1526–1567)
- Alexander Gordon, 12th Earl of Sutherland (c. 1552–1594)
- John Gordon, 13th Earl of Sutherland (1576–1615)
- John Gordon, 14th Earl of Sutherland (1609–1679)
- George Gordon, 15th Earl of Sutherland (1633–1703)
- John Gordon, 16th Earl of Sutherland (1661–1733) (changed his surname from Gordon to Sutherland)
- William Sutherland, 17th Earl of Sutherland (1708–1750)
- William Sutherland, 18th Earl of Sutherland (1735–1766)
- Elizabeth Sutherland, 19th Countess of Sutherland (1765–1839), wife of George Leveson-Gower, 1st Duke of Sutherland
- George Granville Sutherland-Leveson-Gower, 2nd Duke of Sutherland, 20th Earl of Sutherland (1786–1861)
- George Granville William Sutherland-Leveson-Gower, 3rd Duke of Sutherland, 21st Earl of Sutherland (1828–1892)
- Cromartie Sutherland-Leveson-Gower, 4th Duke of Sutherland, 22nd Earl of Sutherland (1851–1913)
- George Granville Sutherland-Leveson-Gower, 5th Duke of Sutherland, 23rd Earl of Sutherland (1888–1963)
- Elizabeth Sutherland, 24th Countess of Sutherland (1921–2019)
- Alistair Sutherland, 25th Earl of Sutherland (born 1947)

== Present peer ==
Alistair Charles St Clair Sutherland, 25th Earl of Sutherland (born 7 January 1947) is the son of Charles Noel Janson and Elizabeth, Countess of Sutherland. At birth, he was given the names Alistair Charles St. Clair Janson; in 1963 he became Lord Strathnaver, when he also changed his surname to Sutherland. He was educated at Eton College and Christ Church, Oxford, graduating BA.

He worked for the Metropolitan Police between 1969 and 1974 and for IBM between 1976 and 1979.

On 9 December 2019, he succeeded as Earl of Sutherland in the peerage of Scotland (created 1235).

On 29 November 1968, as Strathnaver, he married firstly Eileen Elizabeth Baker, daughter of Richard Wheeler Baker; they were divorced in 1980, having had two daughters:

- Lady Rachel Elizabeth Sutherland, Mistress of Sutherland (born 1970)
- Lady Rosemary Millicent Sutherland (born 1972)

On 21 March 1980, Sutherland married secondly Gillian Murray, daughter of Robert Murray, and they had a son and a daughter:

- Alexander Charles Robert Sutherland, Lord Strathnaver (1981–2022)
- Lady Elizabeth Sutherland (born 1984)

Sutherland's heir apparent, Alexander, Lord Strathnaver, died in a fall at cliffs near Thurso Castle on 3 September 2022. The present heir presumptive is Sutherland's eldest daughter, Lady Rachel Sutherland, Mistress of Sutherland.

=== Line of succession ===
- Elizabeth Sutherland, 24th Countess of Sutherland (1921–2019)
  - Alistair Charles St. Clair Sutherland, 25th Earl of Sutherland (born 1947)
    - (1). Rachel Elizabeth Sutherland, Mistress of Sutherland (born 1970)
    - (2). Rosemary Millicent Sutherland (born 1972)
    - (3). Elizabeth Sutherland Costin (born 1984)
      - (4). Isaac Sutherland Costin (born 2015)
  - (5). The Hon. Martin Dearman Sutherland Janson (born 1947)
    - (6). Nicholas George Sutherland Janson (born 1977)
    - (7). Benjamin Edward Sutherland Janson (born 1979)
      - (8). Wilfred Bertie Sutherland Janson (born 2011)
      - (9). Poppy Islay Sutherland Janson (born 2008)
      - (10). Isabella Rose Sutherland Janson (born 2013)
    - (11). Alexander Martin Sutherland Janson (born 1981)
    - (12). Christopher David Sutherland Janson (born 1984)
  - (13). Lady Annabell Elizabeth Hélène Bainton (born 1952)
    - (14). Alice Elizabeth Vernon Prescott (born 1985)

Gordon, Leveson-Gower, and Egerton family trees: Earls Gower, Marquesses of Stafford, Earls and Dukes of Sutherland and subsidiary titles

Earl of Sutherland and Lord Strathnaver, 1228 or 1231
William de Moravia a.k.a. Sutherland c. 1210–1248; 1st Earl of Sutherland, etc.
William de Moravia a.k.a. Sutherland c. 1235–1307; 2nd Earl of Sutherland, etc.
William de Moravia a.k.a. Sutherland fl. Early 14th century 3rd Earl of Sutherland, etc.	Kenneth de Moravia a.k.a. Sutherland d. 1333; 4th Earl of Sutherland, etc.
William de Moravia a.k.a. Sutherland d. 1370; 5th Earl of Sutherland, etc.
Robert Sutherland d. 1444; 6th Earl of Sutherland, etc.
John Sutherland d. 1460; 7th Earl of Sutherland, etc.
Alex Sutherland d. 1456; Master of Sutherland	John Sutherland d. 1508; 8th Earl of Sutherland, etc.
John Sutherland d. 1514; 9th Earl of Sutherland, etc.	Elizabeth Sutherland d. 1535; 10th Countess of Sutherland and Lady Strathnaver
Earldom of Sutherland resigned, 1527
Alexander Gordon c. 1505-1530; Earl of Sutherland, etc., 1527
John Gordon; 1525–1567; 11th Earl of Sutherland, etc.
Alexander Gordon d. 1594; 12th Earl of Sutherland, etc.
John Gordon; 1576–1615; 13th Earl of Sutherland, etc.
John Gordon; 1609–1679; 14th Earl of Sutherland, etc.
George Gordon; 1633–1703; 15th Earl of Sutherland, etc.
John Gordon; 1661–1733; 16th Earl of Sutherland, etc.
Baron Gower of Sittenham in the County of York, 1703
William Gordon; 1683–1720 styled Lord Strathnaver	John Leveson-Gower; 1675–1709; 1st Baron Gower, 5th Baronet
Earl Gower and Viscount Trentham of Trentham in the County of Stafford, 1746
William Sutherland; 1708–1750; 17th Earl of Sutherland, etc.	John Leveson-Gower; 1694–1754; 1st Earl Gower, etc., 2nd Baron Gower
Marquess of Stafford, 1786
William Sutherland; 1735–1766; 18th Earl of Sutherland, etc.	Granville Leveson-Gower; 1721–1803; 1st Marquess of Stafford, 2nd Earl Gower, etc., 3rd Baron Gower
Duke of Sutherland, 1833	Viscount Granville, of Stone Park in the County of Stafford, 1815; Earl Granville (2nd creation) and Baron Leveson of Stone Park in the County of Stafford, 1833
Lady Elizabeth Sutherland; 1765–1839; 19th Countess of Sutherland, etc. suo jure	George Granville Leveson-Gower; 1758–1833; 1st Duke of Sutherland, 2nd Marquess of Stafford, 3rd Earl Gower, etc., 4th Baron Gower	Granville Leveson-Gower; 1773–1846; 1st Earl Granville, etc.
Earl of Ellesmere and Viscount Brackley of Brackley in the County of Northampton, 1846
George Granville Sutherland-Leveson-Gower; 1786–1861; 2nd Duke of Sutherland, 3rd Marquess of Stafford, 20th Earl of Sutherland, etc., 4th Earl Gower, etc., 5th Baron Gower	Francis Egerton; 1800–1857; 1st Earl of Ellesmere, etc.
George Granville Sutherland-Leveson-Gower; 1828–1892; 3rd Duke of Sutherland, 4th Marquess of Stafford, 21st Earl of Sutherland, etc., 5th Earl Gower, etc., 6th Baron Gower	George Granville Francis Egerton; 1823–1862; 2nd Earl of Ellesmere, etc.	Granville George Leveson-Gower; 1815–1891; 2nd Earl Granville, etc.
George Granville Sutherland-Leveson-Gower; 1850–1858; Earl Gower	Cromartie Sutherland-Leveson-Gower; 1851–1913; 4th Duke of Sutherland, 5th Marquess of Stafford, 22nd Earl of Sutherland, etc., 6th Earl Gower, etc., 7th Baron Gower	Francis Charles Granville Egerton; 1847–1914; 3rd Earl of Ellesmere, etc.
George Granville Sutherland-Leveson-Gower; 1888–1963; 5th Duke of Sutherland, 6th Marquess of Stafford, 23rd Earl of Sutherland, etc., 7th Earl Gower, etc., 8th Baron Gower	Lord Alastair St Clair; 1890–1921; Sutherland-Leveson-Gower	John Francis Granville Scrope Egerton; 1872–1944; 4th Earl of Ellesmere, etc.	Thomas Henry Frederick Egerton; 1876–1953	Granville George Leveson-Gower; 1872–1939; 3rd Earl Granville, etc.	William Spencer Leveson-Gower; 1880–1953; 4th Earl Granville, etc.
Elizabeth Millicent Sutherland; 1921–2019; 24th Countess of Sutherland, etc. suo jure	John Sutherland Egerton; 1915–2000; 6th Duke of Sutherland, 7th Marquess of Stafford, 5th Earl of Ellesmere, etc., 8th Earl Gower, etc., 9th Baron Gower	Reginald Cyril Egerton; 1905–1992	Granville James Leveson-Gower; 1918–1996; 5th Earl Granville, etc.
Alastair Charles St Clair Sutherland b. 1947; 25th Earl of Sutherland, etc.	Francis Ronald Egerton b. 1940; 7th Duke of Sutherland, 8th Marquess of Stafford, 6th Earl of Ellesmere, etc., 9th Earl Gower, etc., 10th Baron Gower	(Granville George) Fergus Leveson-Gower b. 1959; 6th Earl Granville, etc.
Rachel Elizabeth Sutherland b. 1970 styled Mistress of Sutherland	Alexander Charles Robert Sutherland; 1981–2022 styled Lord Strathnaver	James Granville Egerton b. 1975 styled Marquess of Stafford	George James Leveson-Gower b. 1999
Heir presumptive to the Earldom of Sutherland	Heir apparent to the Dukedom of Sutherland and Earldom of Ellesmere	Heir apparent to the Earldom of Granville

== See also ==
- Clan Sutherland
- Lord Duffus
- Duke of Sutherland
- Leveson-Gower family
