= Dunrobin Castle =

Castle in the north of Scotland

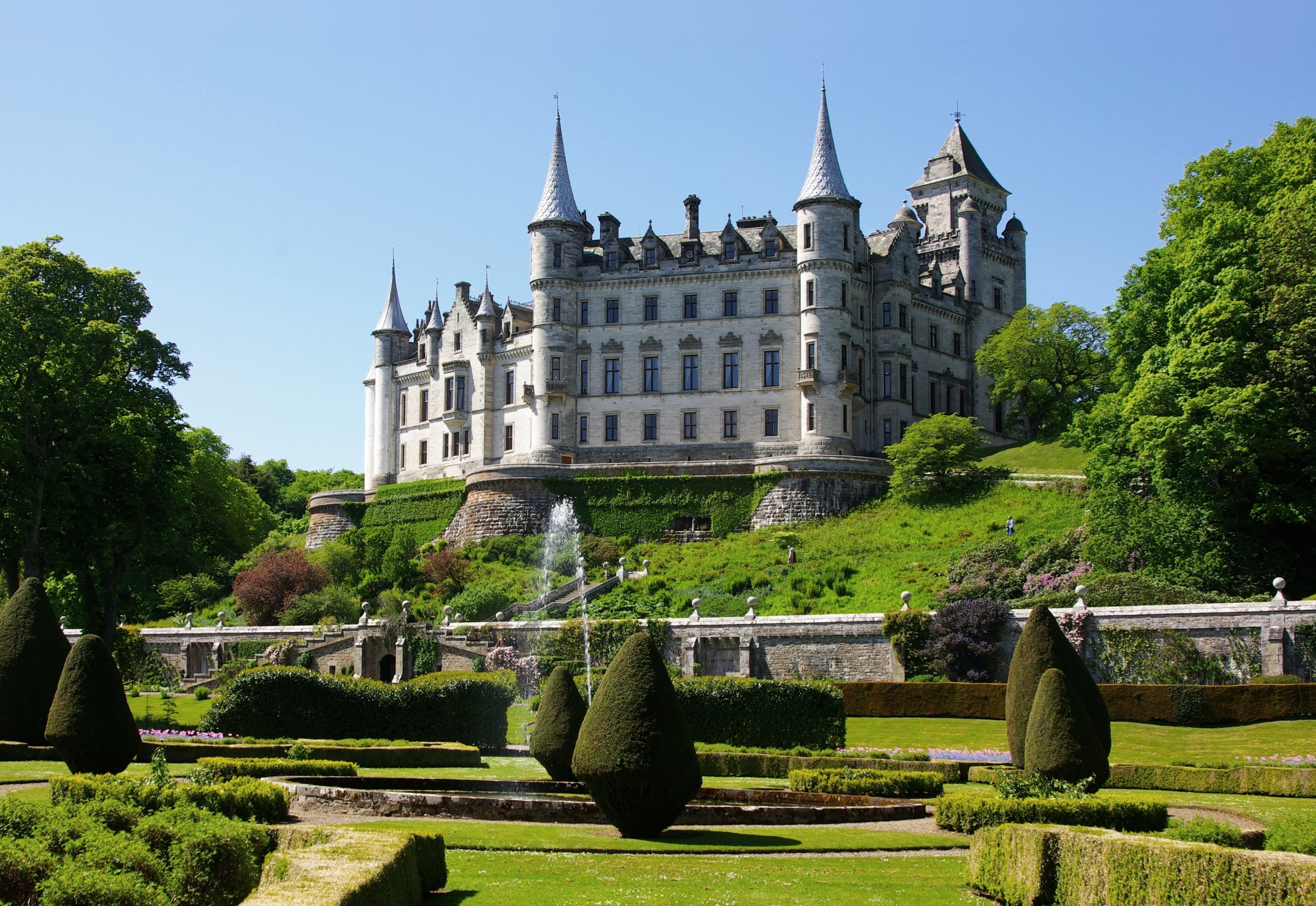
- East front of Dunrobin Castle and gardens

- Location within Sutherland

General information
- Type: Country house
- Architectural style: Scottish baronial/French Renaissance
- Location: Golspie, Highland, Scotland, United Kingdom
- Coordinates: 57°58′55″N 3°56′43″W
- Completed: 1845
- Client: George Sutherland-Leveson-Gower, 2nd Duke of Sutherland
- Owner: Alistair Charles St Clair Sutherland, 25th Earl of Sutherland

Design and construction
- Architect: Sir Charles Barry

Website
- dunrobincastle.co.uk

Inventory of Gardens and Designed Landscapes in Scotland
- Official name: Dunrobin Castle
- Designated: 30 June 1987
- Reference no.: GDL00160

Dunrobin Castle is a stately home in Sutherland, in the Highland area of Scotland, that serves as the family seat of the Earl of Sutherland, Chief of Clan Sutherland. It is located one mile (1.5 kilometres) north of Golspie and approximately five miles (eight kilometres) south of Brora, overlooking the Dornoch Firth.

Dunrobin's origins lie in the Middle Ages, but most of the present building and the gardens were added by Sir Charles Barry between 1835 and 1850. Some of the original building is visible in the interior courtyard, despite a number of expansions and alterations that made it the largest house in the north of Scotland. After being used as a boarding school from 1965 to 1972, Dunrobin has been open to the public since 1973.

== History ==
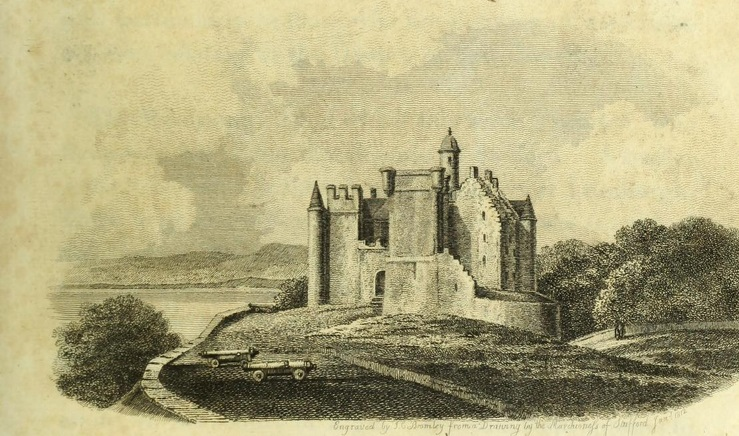
Dunrobin Castle as it appeared in about 1813, before later improvements

The lands of Sutherland were acquired before 1211 by Hugh, Lord of Duffus, grandson of the Flemish nobleman Freskin. The Earldom of Sutherland was created around 1235 for Hugh's son, William, surmised to have descended from the House of Moray by the female line.

The castle may have been built on the site of an early medieval fort, but the oldest surviving portion, with an iron yett, is first mentioned in 1401. The earliest castle was a square keep with walls over six feet (1.8 metres) thick. Unusually, the ceilings of each floor were formed by stone vaults rather than being timber. The castle is thought to be named after Robert Sutherland, 6th Earl of Sutherland (died 1444).

Dunrobin Castle was built in the midst of a tribal society, with Norse and Gaelic in use at the time. Robert the Bruce planted the Gordons, who supported his claim to the crown, at Huntly in Aberdeenshire, and they were created Earls of Huntly in 1445. The Earldom passed to the Gordon family in the 16th century when the 8th Earl of Sutherland gave his daughter Elizabeth in marriage to Adam Gordon. After the 8th Earl died in 1508, Elizabeth's elder brother was declared heir to the title, but a brieve (writ) of idiocy brought against him and his younger brother by the Gordons meant that the possession of the estate went to Adam Gordon in 1512.

In 1518, in the absence of Adam Gordon, the castle was captured by Alexander Sutherland, the legitimate heir to the Earldom of Sutherland. The Gordons quickly retook the castle, captured Alexander and placed his head on a spear on top of the castle tower. Alexander's son John made an attempt on the castle in 1550, but was killed in the castle garden. During the more peaceful 17th century, the keep was extended with the addition of a large house, built around a courtyard to the south-west.

During the Jacobite rising of 1745, the Jacobites under Charles Edward Stuart stormed Dunrobin Castle without warning, because the Clan Sutherland supported the British government. The 17th Earl of Sutherland, who had changed his surname from Gordon to Sutherland, narrowly escaped them, exiting through a back door. He sailed for Aberdeen where he joined the Duke of Cumberland's army. On the death of the 18th Earl in 1766, the house passed to his daughter, Elizabeth, who married the politician George Leveson-Gower, later created 1st Duke of Sutherland. In 1785, the house was altered and extended again.

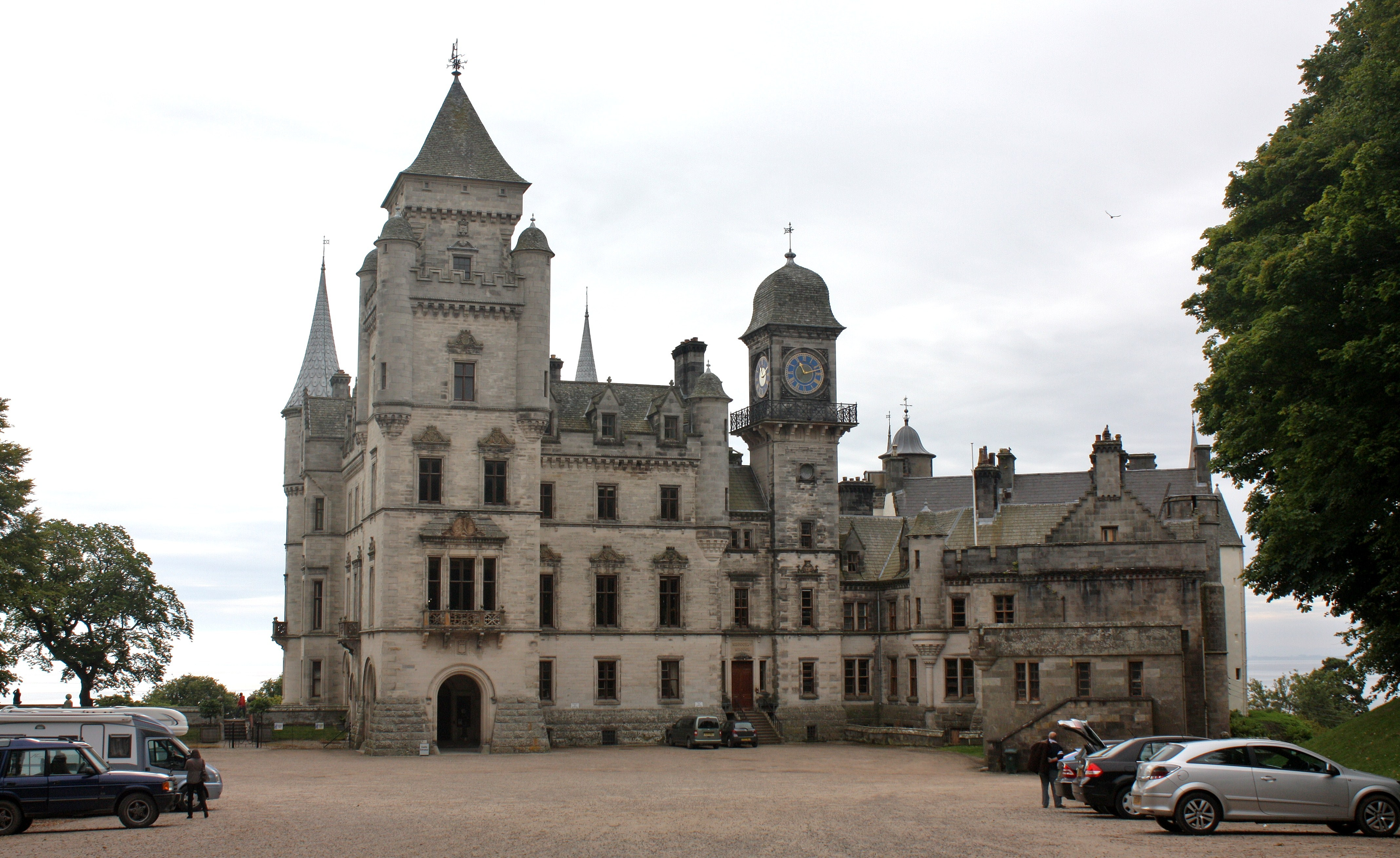
The west entrance of Dunrobin Castle, with the portion added by Charles Barry in the foreground

Between 1835 and 1850, Sir Charles Barry remodelled the castle in the Scottish Baronial style for the 2nd Duke of Sutherland. Barry had been the architect for the Palace of Westminster, home to the British Parliament, and was much in demand. He was influenced by his recently completed Italianate Garden at Trentham, the Duke's English seat. The 14th-century tower, as well as the 17th-century and 18th-century extensions, were retained and survive within Barry's 19th-century work.

Dunrobin Castle railway station, on the Far North Line, was opened in 1870 as a private station for the castle. The present waiting room was constructed in 1902, and it is a category B listed building.

During the First World War, the building was in use as a naval hospital when fire in 1915 damaged the roof and much of the interior, but this was confined to the newer additions by Barry. Scottish architect Sir Robert Lorimer was engaged to renovate the house following the war. From the 1920s, the increasing cost of employment led to jobs such as the pollarding of trees being neglected. When the 5th Duke of Sutherland died in 1963, the earldom and the house went to his niece, the 24th Countess of Sutherland, while the dukedom had to pass to a male heir and went to John Egerton, Earl of Ellesmere.

Between 1965 and 1972, the house became a boarding school for boys, taking on forty boys and five teachers in its first year. Since 1973, the house and grounds have been open to the public, with private accommodation retained for the use of the Sutherland family.

== Architecture ==
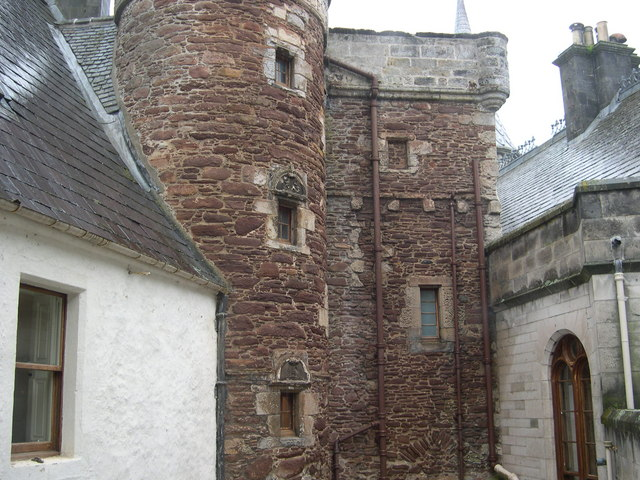
An older part integrated into newer additions

There are 189 rooms within the castle, making it the largest in the northern Highlands. Much of Barry's interior was destroyed by the fire of 1915, leading to the restoration by Sir Robert Lorimer, although he incorporated surviving 17th-century and 18th-century work, including wood carvings attributed to Grinling Gibbons. Externally, the castle has elements inspired by the work of the French architect Viollet-le-Duc, such as the pyramidal roof over the main entrance.

The portion built by Barry uses freestone in broadly the same style as the turreted parts from the 16th and 17th centuries, but borrows significant elements from the château style. A large quadrangular pile of four stories, with towers at each corner, connects to the older castle by a building of three stories and containing the stately apartments. The tallest tower, containing the entrance, is 135 ft (41 m) high, the round towers being 115 ft (35 m) high and the clock tower 125 ft (38 m).

St. John's Well, in the courtyard of the oldest portion of the castle, is one of the deepest draw wells in Scotland, at 92 feet (28 m). There is no indication as to the origin of the name.

=== Interior ===
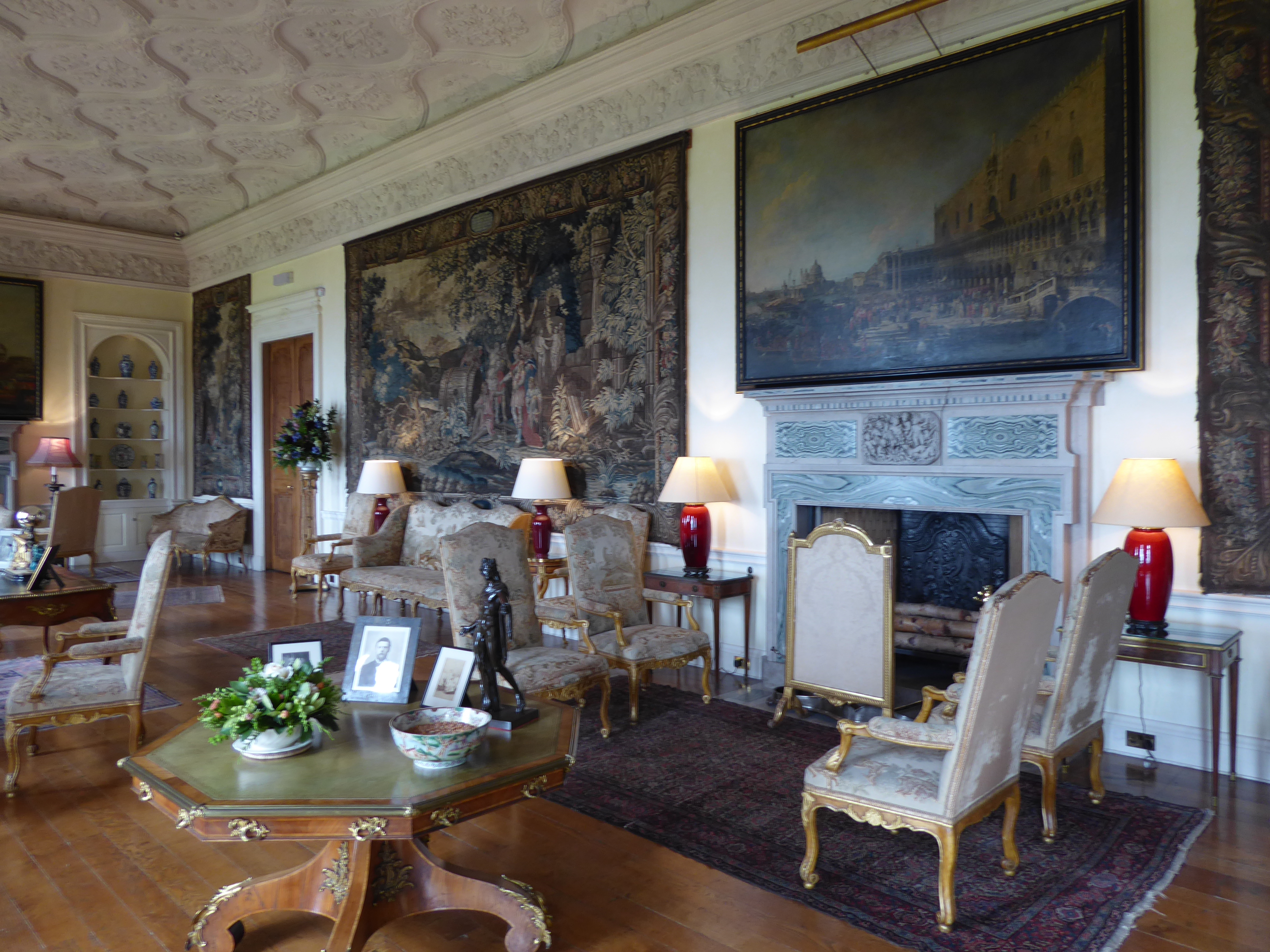
Dunrobin Castle – drawing room

In the entrance hall is a frieze of the armorials used by past earls of Sutherland. The main stairway, decorated with portraits of the Leveson-Gower family, is around 30 ft (9 m) wide and 50 ft (15 m) high. The panelled dining room, 40 ft (12 m) long and 22 ft (6.7 m) wide, has a wall-top Italian Grisaille frieze and a Khorassan carpet, as well as chairs containing the needlework of the 5th Duke's wife. The drawing room, made from two previous rooms by Lorimer during his restoration of the castle, looks out over the gardens and sea, and contains large Canalettos and 18th-century tapestries, as well as portraits by Hoppner and Reynolds. Housing over 10,000 books, the library features a painting by Philip de László of Duchess Eileen, as well as a mahogany Chippendale table.

There is an aeolian orchestrelle, a pressure-operated harmonium reed organ, located in one of the hallways.

== Gardens ==
The gardens as viewed from the castle

The French influence extends into the gardens, completed in 1850, with Barry taking inspiration from the French formal style of the Gardens of Versailles. Each parterre is set around a circular pool with a fountain, with the essential layout the same since it was created in around 1848. Barry designed the parterre as an optical illusion, seen from above they appear to stretch beyond their physical layout, by narrowing it gradually. The total landscaped area is 1,379 acres (558 hectares).

Falconry displays are held in the castle's gardens by a resident falconer.

== Museum ==
A museum displays the trophy heads of animals shot by family members on safari, ethnographic items from around the world and an important collection of archaeological artefacts. The museum retains its Victorian-Edwardian arrangement, and is housed in an 18th-century summer-house adjoining the formal gardens. Historically, the castle is a category A listed building, and the gardens are included in the Inventory of Gardens and Designed Landscapes in Scotland.

== Visiting ==
The castle is open to visitors between April and October each year. The food court accommodates two 25-year old palm trees which were grown from seeds of a palm tree which grew at the Duke of Sutherland's hunting lodge on the Scottish northern coast.
