= William Fraser (historian) =

Scottish solicitor and historian

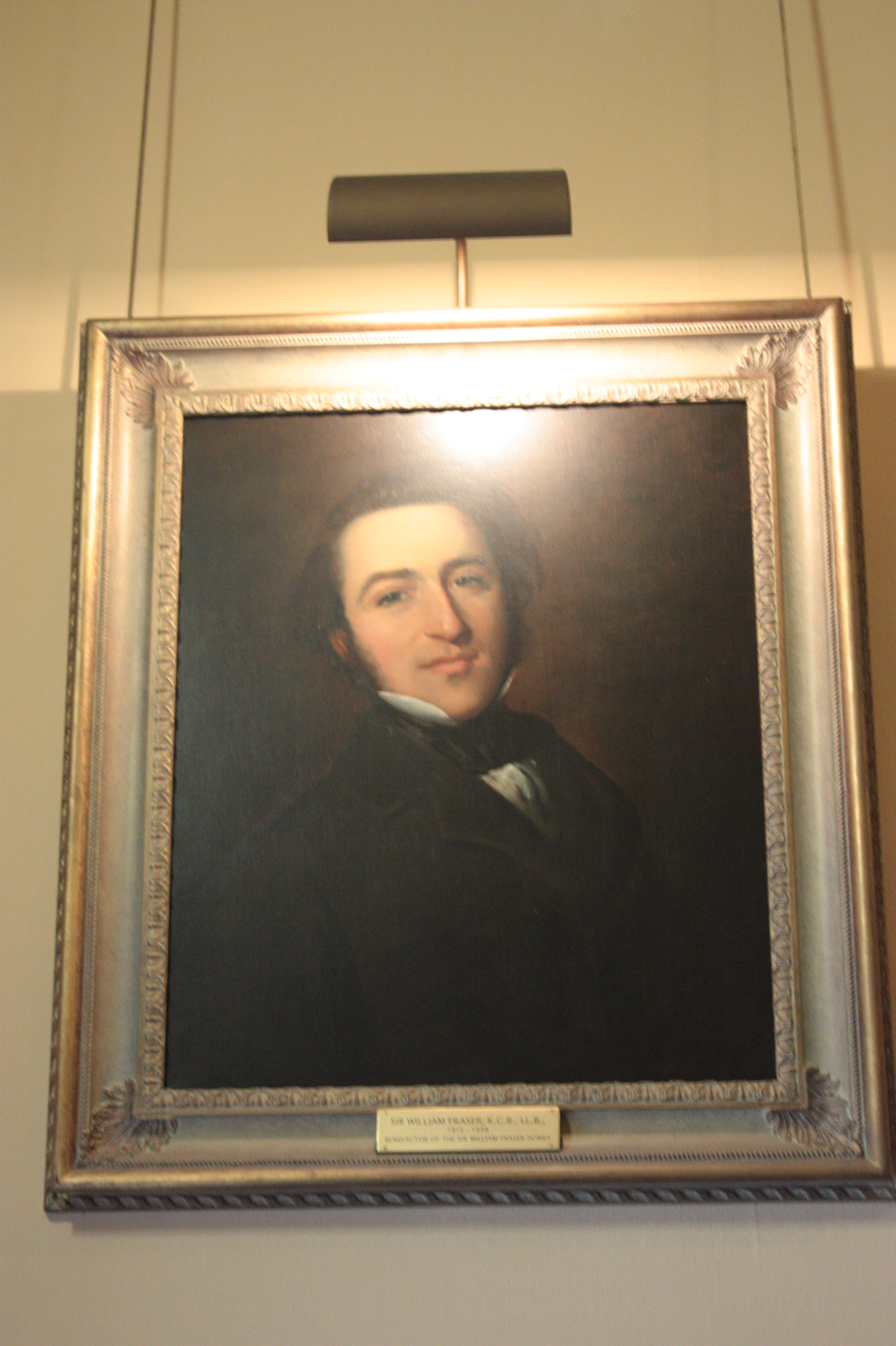
Portrait of Sir William Fraser, Merchants Hall, Edinburgh

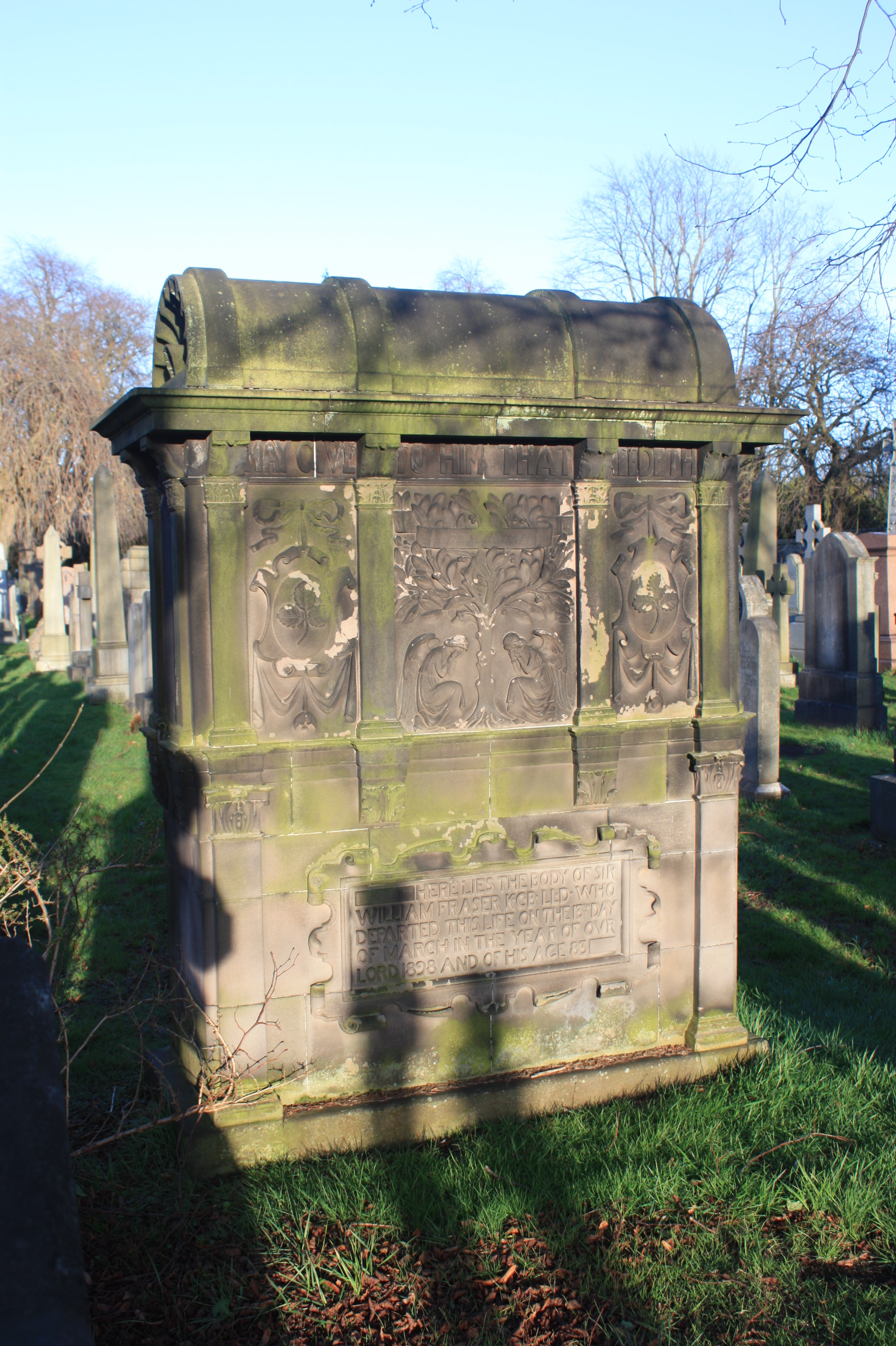
The grave of William Fraser (1816–1898), Dean Cemetery

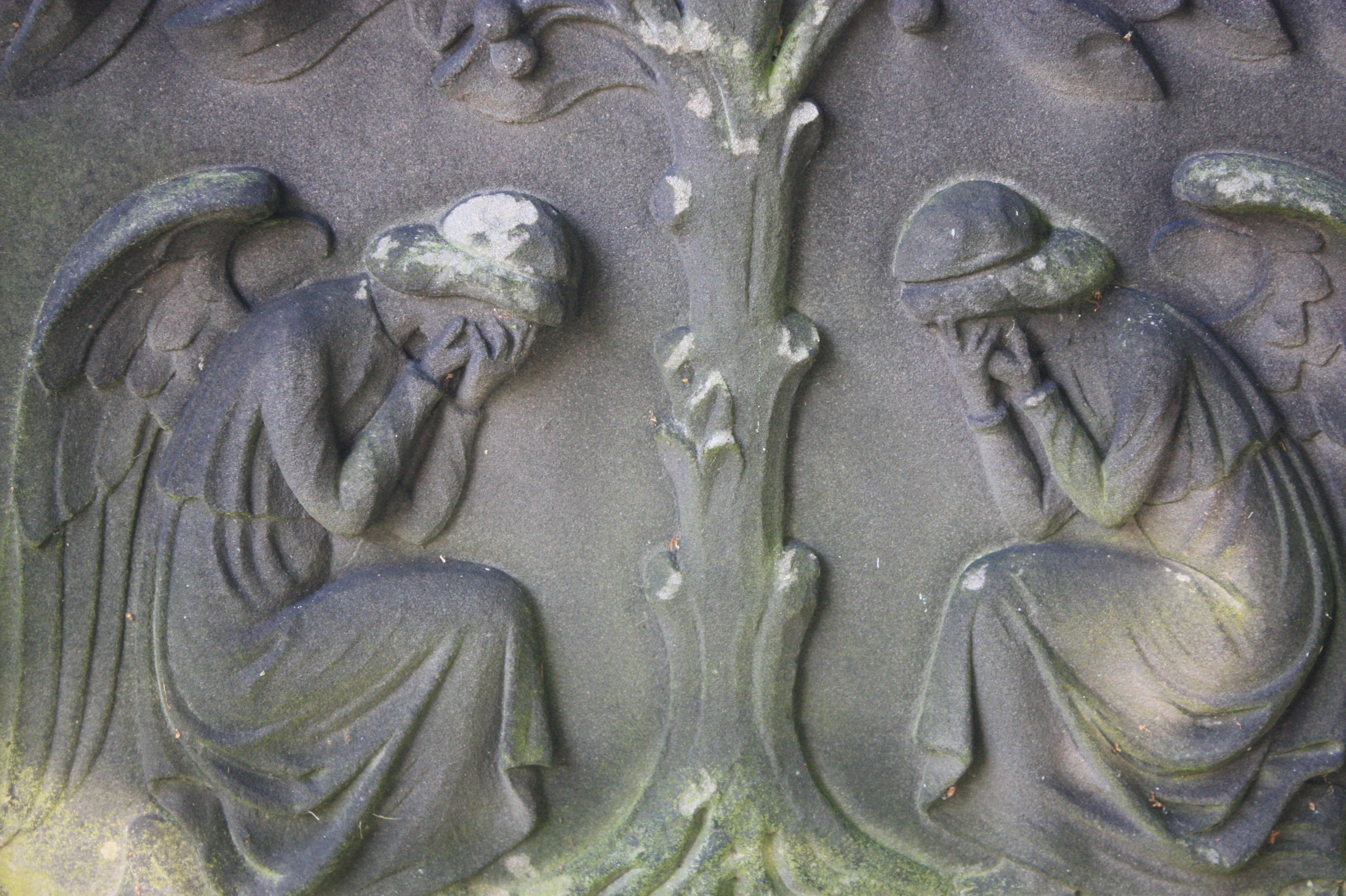
Detail on Sir Wm Fraser's grave, Dean Cemetery

Sir William Fraser, KCB (18 February 1816 – 13 March 1898) was a solicitor and notable expert in ancient Scottish history, palaeography, and genealogy.

== Life ==
Fraser's family were farmers and craftsmen in The Mearns. He was the eldest of the two sons and daughter of Ann (died 1821) and James Fraser (1786–1834), a mason. His mother was the daughter of James Walker, tenant of the farm of Elfhill of Fetteresso, about 5 miles (8.0 km) from Stonehaven. The couple were settled and were feuholders at Links of Arduthie.

Fraser was initially educated at a private school in Stonehaven kept by the Reverend Charles Michie. Michie graduated with an MA from Aberdeen's Marischal College in 1810, and spent his life teaching.

On 23 August 1830, Fraser began a five-year apprenticeship with Messrs Brand and Burnett, solicitors in Stonehaven. He went to Edinburgh in December 1835, where he joined the firm of Hill and Tod, Writers to Her Majesty's Signet. He continued his education at the University of Edinburgh studying Scots law and conveyancing. In 1838 he was taking classes in French.

He was subsequently involved in various cases requiring antiquarian and, in particular, genealogical research. He became an expert in these fields and published a series of approximately 50 volumes on the histories of between 20 and 30 leading noble and landed families of Scotland.

Fraser was frequently summoned to London to give evidence before the Committee for Privileges of the House of Lords.

In 1882 the University of Edinburgh conferred on him the honorary degree of LLD. In 1885 he was created a Companion of the Order of the Bath and in 1887 he was made a Civil Knight Commander of the Bath, being invested by Queen Victoria at Osborne House on 2 August that year. The knighthood was a unique distinction for a Scottish historian at that time.

An article in the Dundee Advertiser on 1 June 1896, stated: "There is no Scotsman living who has so much experience in deciphering ancient documents, nor one who can so skillfully extract information from faded and time-worn parchments" as Sir William Fraser.

Sir William Fraser died on 13 March 1898, three months after his sister Ann, who had kept house for him since 1846. They share a highly unusual and ornate grave, designed by the architect Arthur Forman Paul, in Dean Cemetery in Edinburgh just south of the northmost path in the north section of the original cemetery.

== Legacy ==
The Sir William Fraser Chair of Scottish History and Palaeography at the University of Edinburgh, founded in 1901, is the oldest chair of Scottish History. The professorship was named after and endowed by Sir William Fraser, who gave the University £25,000 for it. The chair has been held by a number of distinguished historians.

In his will he also endowed the Fraser Homes at Colinton (Edinburgh) for "authors or artists in necessitous circumstances".

He also left money for "printing works which would tend to elucidate the history and antiquities of Scotland". The nine-volume book series, The Scots Peerage (1904–1914), by Sir James Balfour Paul, was used for that purpose and is dedicated to him.

=== Sir William Fraser Chair of Scottish History and Palaeography professors ===
- Peter Hume Brown 1901–1918
- Robert Kerr Hannay 1919–1940
- William Croft Dickinson 1940–1963
- Gordon Donaldson 1963–1979
- Geoffrey W.S. Barrow 1979–1992
- Michael Lynch 1993–2005
- Tom M Devine 2006–2011
- Ewen A. Cameron 2012–present

== Works ==
Fraser's writings include:

- Fraser, William (1859). Memorials of the Montgomeries Earls of Eglinton.
- Fraser, William (1869). The Chiefs of Colquhoun and Their Country. Vol. 1.
- Fraser, William (1876). The Earls of Cromartie, Their Kindred, Country and Correspondence. Vol. 2.
- Fraser, William (1885). The Douglas Book. Vol. 1.
- Fraser, William (1892). The Sutherland Book. Vol. 1.
