= William Sutherland, 7th of Duffus =

Scottish noble

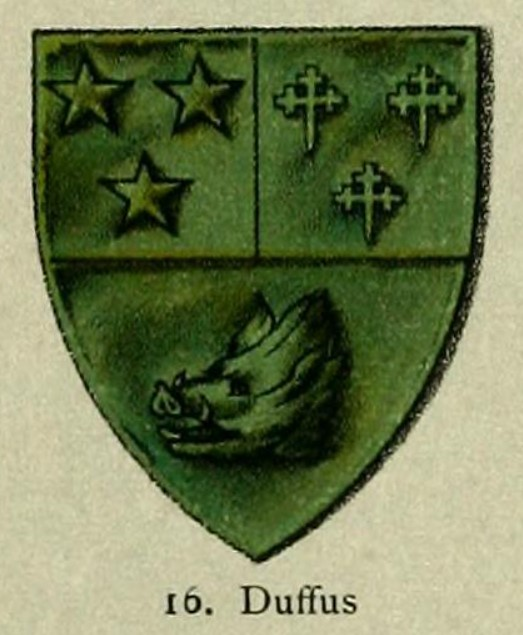
Original Coat of Arms of William Sutherland, 7th of Duffus

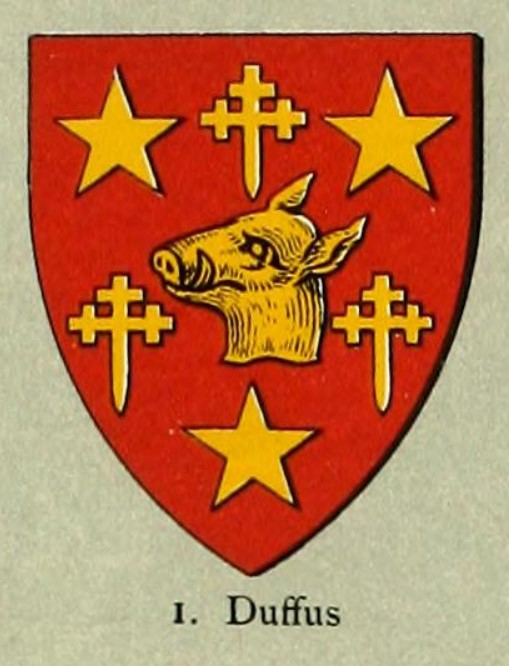
Later Coat of Arms of William Sutherland, 7th of Duffus

William Sutherland, 7th of Duffus (died 1543) was a Scottish member of the nobility and a cadet of the Clan Sutherland.

== Early life ==
He was the son of William Sutherland, 6th of Duffus who had been killed in 1530, in Thurso by the Clan Gunn. According to Sir Robert Gordon, 1st Baronet, they had been instigated to do so by Andrew Stewart who was the Bishop of Caithness.

== Laird of Duffus ==
William Sutherland, 7th of Duffus made strenuous effort's to avenge his father's death and he refused various offers of compensation that were made to him. He summoned the Bishop of Caithness who had killed his father to appear before him in Edinburgh, but the Bishop ignored this request. He then seized one of the Bishop's servants and as a result he and his uncle, the Dean of Caithness, were brought before the Privy Council of Scotland. They were imprisoned and forced to come to terms with the Bishop without compensation before they were set free.

Around 1534, Sutherland of Duffus granted a discharge to John Murray of Cambusavie for the balance of 500 merks due to his father. On 25 September 1335, he was declared to be his father's heir in Torboll and other lands. He granted on mortgage the lands of Kinstearie and Brichtmony to John Campbell of Calder in February 1540. In 1542, William Sutherland of Duffus was declared by a lawful jury to be the heir of his father in all of the lands and rents which his father had died infeft within Inverness-shire.

Also in 1542, William Sutherland of Duffus and Donald Mackay, 11th of Strathnaver submitted to the arbitration of James Stewart, Earl of Moray their claims to certain lands that had caused much bloodshed, but in the end was decided in favour of Mackay which ended the feud.

== Family ==
William Sutherland of Duffus died before the end of 1543. He married Elizabeth Stewart, who survived him and re-married to James Murray of Culbardie. William Sutherland's and Elizabeth Stewart's children were:

1. Alexander Sutherland, 8th of Duffus, heir and successor of Duffus.
2. William Sutherland of Evelix, who appears as a witness in charters favouring his elder brother in 1562. He participated with his brothers in the taking and holding of Berriedale Castle in 1566. In the aftermath of the Battle of Torran-Roy in 1570, where Dornoch Cathedral was burnt, he allegedly broke open the coffin of Gilbert de Moravia (died 1245) who was the Bishop of Caithness and "scattered the saint's dust to the wind". He soon died of a disease, probably blood poisoning.
3. Nicholas Sutherland, who also witnessed the charters of 1562, was named in charters in 1562 and 1566, and was involved in the affair of Berriedale Castle.
4. Walter Sutherland was named as a brother of Alexander Sutherland in 1562, but it is possible that William is the same person intended.

== See also ==
- Lord Duffus
