= William Sutherland, 5th of Duffus =

Scottish noble

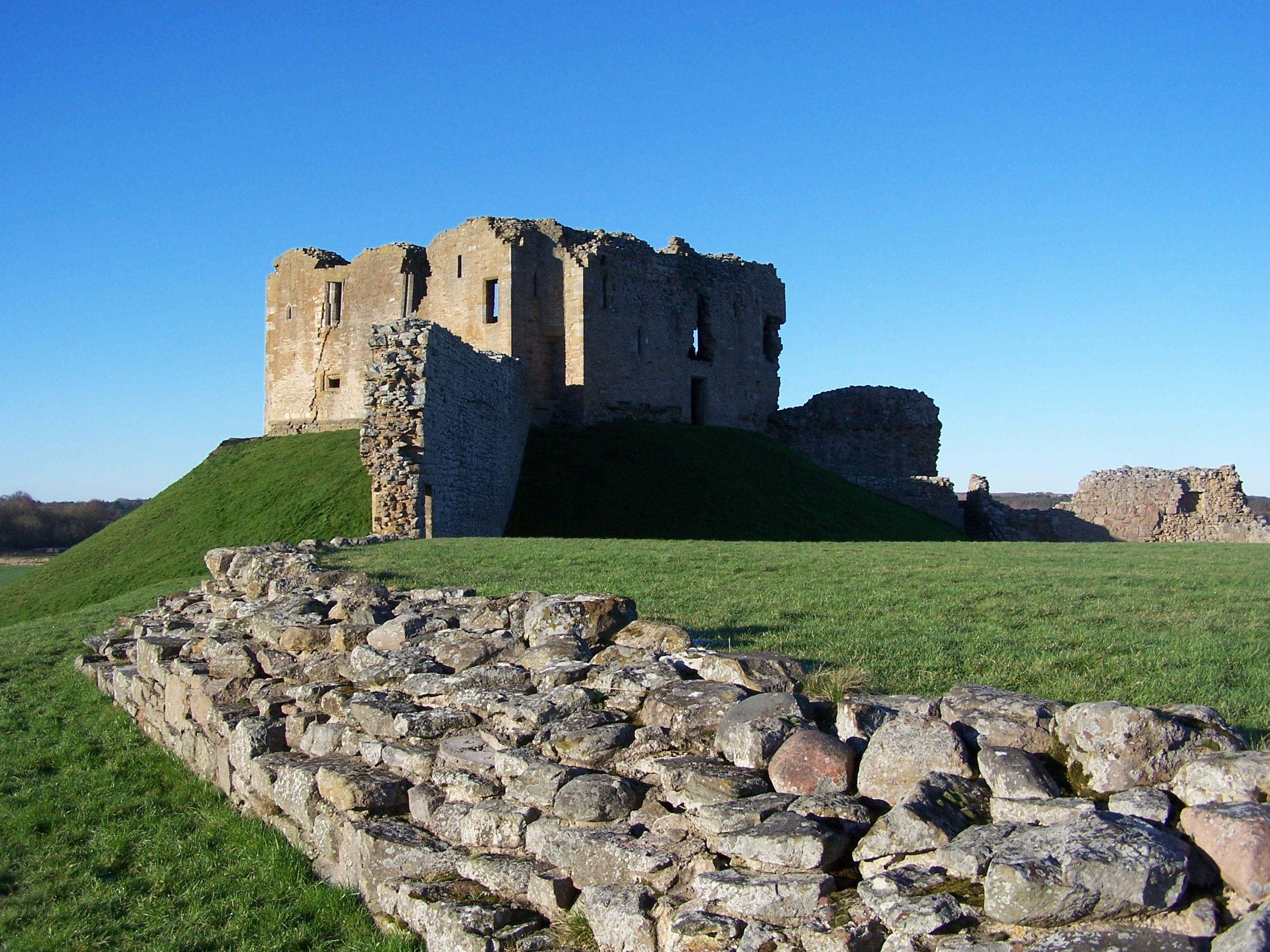
Ruins of Duffus Castle, seat of William Sutherland, 5th of Duffus

William Sutherland, 5th of Duffus (died 1529) was a member of the Scottish nobility and a cadet of the Clan Sutherland.

== Early life ==
He was the son of William Sutherland, 4th of Duffus who died in 1513 and his mother may have been Janet Innes Lady Greeship, said to be a daughter of the family of Innes, who as a widow re-married before 1517 to Hugh Rose of Kilravock. He succeeded his father in the lands of Duffus and Quarrelwood in 1513-1514.

== Laird of Duffus ==
In 1519-20, he was infeft in his father's lands of Brichmond or Brichtomy. He received a grant for the lands of Kinstearie from James V of Scotland in 1524. On 25 March 1525 Elizabeth Sutherland, 10th Countess of Sutherland and her husband Adam Gordon who were superiors of the lands of Sutherland granted to him the lands of Torboll and Pronsy which had previously belonged to the late Hugh Sutherland of Pronsy.

== Family ==
In 1527, William Sutherland, 5th of Duffus resigned his lands of Duffus and Quarrelwood in Elgin, Moray, and Brichtmony, Kinstearie and the mill of Auldearn in Nairn in favour of his eldest son. He died before 1 June 1529. He married Janet Innes, daughter of Alexander Innes and had the following children:

1. William Sutherland, 6th of Duffus, killed in 1530 leaving a son.
2. Alexander Sutherland, Dean of Caithness in 1529 and still alive in 1551. He obtained the rectory of Duffus in 1512 and in 1524 was made perpetual chaplain of the chapel of the Virgin Mary of the Castle of Duffus.
3. Elizabeth Sutherland, who married John Sinclair, 3rd Earl of Caithness and had issue.

== See also ==
- Lord Duffus
