= William Sutherland, 10th of Duffus =

Scottish noble

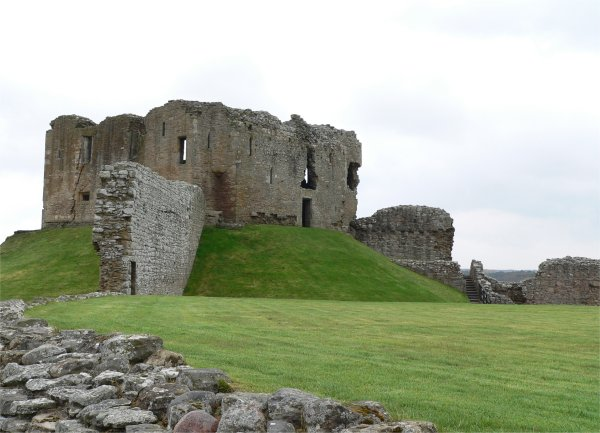
Ruins of Duffus Castle, seat of William Sutherland, 10th of Duffus

William Sutherland, 10th of Duffus (died 1626) was a member of the Scottish nobility and a cadet of the Clan Sutherland.

== Early life ==
He was the son of William Sutherland, 9th of Duffus who had married firstly, Margaret, daughter of George Sinclair, 4th Earl of Caithness. It is not known when she died, but he married secondly, Margaret, daughter of William Mackintosh, 15th of Mackintosh.

== Laird of Duffus ==
William Sutherland, 10th of Duffus was served heir to his father, the deceased William Sutherland, 9th of Duffus, in the lands and barony of Skelbo, within the earldom of Sutherland which was then accounted within the sheriffdom of Inverness, on 30 April 1616. From that date onward he was embroiled with his neighbors, beginning with differences with Sir Robert Gordon, 1st Baronet who was then the Tutor of the Earl of Sutherland. He also took up an aggressive position in regard to the tithes of the lands of Proncy, not only by legal means to stop them going to the young Earl of Sutherland, but also by carrying off the Teind-Sheaves to his own barns. However, he was compelled by the Sheriff of Sutherland to give these up. The matter was brought before the Court of Session which decided against him on the issue of the tithes, but he submitted other questions in dispute to arbitration which was arranged to take place at Elgin, Moray in October 1617.

In 1621, he became involved in another serious dispute, this time with John Gordon, younger of Embo. The Sutherland Laird of Duffus was the first to use violence, assaulting Gordon and slightly wounding him. This led to a feud between the two families which peaked in 1625. Both sides appeared in the law-courts but refused all attempts at reconciliation. Then the Sutherland Laird of Duffus died suddenly in October 1626, and the two families were re-concealed.

== Family ==
He married Jean, daughter of John Grant of Freuchie by contract on 19 September 1612. She survived him and married secondly, Thomas Mackenzie of Pluscarden. William Sutherland, 10th of Duffus and Jean Grant's children were:

1. Alexander Sutherland, 1st Lord Duffus, heir and successor.
2. William Sutherland, named in the testament of his brother the Lord Duffus in 1674. He left a son, James Sutherland, who left a son, another James Sutherland, whose son was Lieutenant Hugh Sutherland.
3. John Sutherland, named on the Commission of Supply for the county of Elgin in 1649 as brother of the Laird of Duffus. He married Isabella, eldest daughter of David Ross of Balnagowan, but died without issue. His brother William was named as his heir in his lands of Kinminitie and others.
4. Anna Sutherland, married Patrick Grant, brother of James Grant of Freuchie.

== See also ==
- Lord Duffus
