= William Sutherland, 9th of Duffus =

Scottish noble

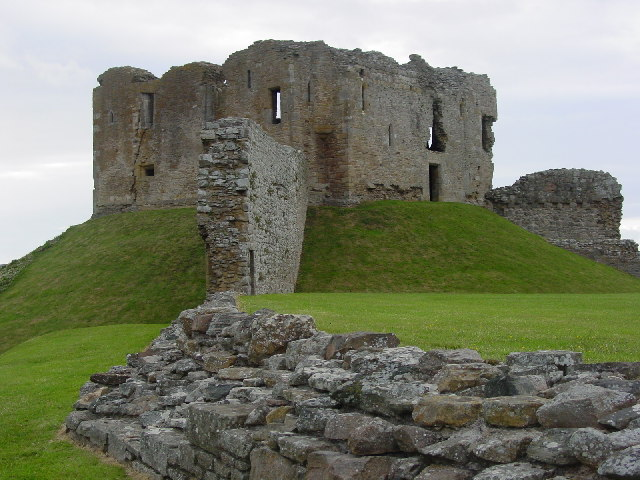
Ruins of Duffus Castle, seat of William Sutherland, 9th of Duffus

William Sutherland, 9th of Duffus (died 1616) was a member of the Scottish nobility and a cadet of the Clan Sutherland.

== Early life ==
He was the second eldest son of Alexander Sutherland, 8th of Duffus and his wife Janet, daughter of James Grant of Freuchie.

== Laird of Duffus ==
In 1579, he was infeft in the lands of Duffus and Greschip, near Elgin, Moray, as heir of his father, the deceased Alexander Sutherland. He also received formal possession of Quarrelwood which had belonged to his grandfather, William Sutherland, 7th of Duffus who had died in 1543. However, he appears to have previously succeeded by right, if not formally, as he appears as "now of Duffus" on 18 June 1574, when he was directed by the Lords of Session to fulfill the terms of the marriage contracts that his father and elder brother had entered into with George Sinclair, 4th Earl of Caithness. He later ratified the existing bond his great-grandfather William Sutherland, 6th of Duffus had entered into with Alexander Gordon, Master of Sutherland, a writ that related to the barony of Skelbo, which he held from the Earls of Sutherland. However, in 1588 he also erected the lands of Duffus, Quarrelwood, Greschip and others that he held near Elgin into a new barony called the barony of Duffus.

In 1606, he entered into an agreement and arbitration with the burgh of Dornoch, the terms of which the boundaries between the lands of the town and his lands of Skelbo and Pronsy were fixed and amicably settled.

At the instance of William Sutherland, 9th of Duffus, a commission was granted to the Earl of Sutherland along with Robert Munro, 18th Baron of Foulis and others on 15 March 1614, for them to apprehend three men who had murdered a certain Donald Angus Gairson and who had failed to appear before the Justice on the day appointed to answer the charge against them. The murderers were captured and put on trial.

William Sutherland, 9th of Duffus died in 1616.

== Family ==
William Sutherland, 9th of Duffus married firstly, Margaret, daughter of George Sinclair, 4th Earl of Caithness. It is not known when she died, but he married secondly, Margaret, daughter of William Mackintosh, 15th of Mackintosh. His children were:

1. William Sutherland, 10th of Duffus, heir and successor.
2. James Sutherland of Kinminitie, who married Margaret, daughter of Sir John Seaton of Monylangain, County Longford, Ireland, leaving one son and two daughters.
3. John Sutherland of Clyne, who left a son, who in turn left two sons and two grandsons.
4. Margaret Sutherland, who married Robert Munro, 18th Baron of Foulis, leaving a daughter.
5. Janet Sutherland, who married as the second wife to George Ogilvy, 1st Lord Banff.

== See also ==
- Lord Duffus
