= Alexander Sutherland, 8th of Duffus =

Scottish noble (died c. 1570)

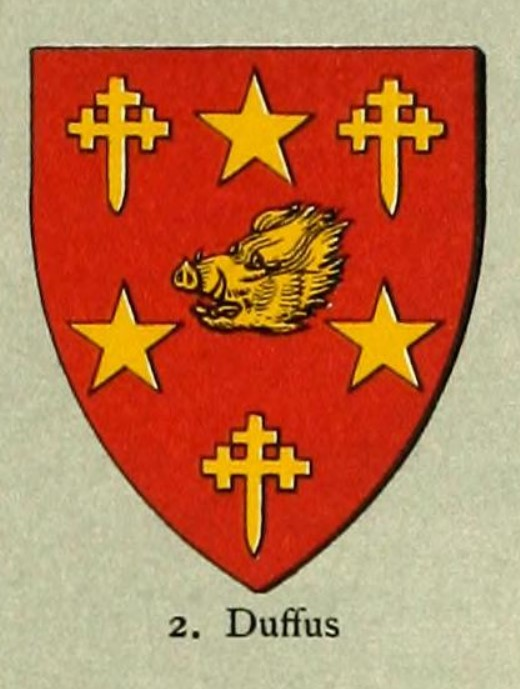
Alexander Sutherland, 8th of Duffus Coat of Arms

Alexander Sutherland, 8th of Duffus (died c. 1570), was a Scottish nobleman and a cadet of Clan Sutherland.

== Early life ==
He was the son of William Sutherland, 7th of Duffus (died 1543) and his wife Elizabeth Stewart. He was still a minor when his father died and when he succeeded to the estates of Duffus. He was still a minor in December 1554, when he was infeft under dispensation from John Gordon, 11th Earl of Sutherland as overlord of the lands of Skelbo and Invershin. However, he may have reached majority by 2 May 1555, when he received sasine for the lands of Duffus and others near Elgin, Moray.

== Laird of Duffus ==
He was a member of the Parliament which ratified the first Confession of Faith in August 1560. The lands of Skelbo, Invershin, Proncy, Torboll and all of the other lands that belonged to Sutherland of Duffus in Sutherland, were erected into a barony by the Earl of Sutherland on 7 November 1562, that was called the barony of Skelbo, to be held by Sutherland of Duffus and his heirs. In June 1563, as the Earl of Sutherland had been forfeited, Alexander Sutherland of Duffus received a grant directly from the Crown for the lands of Skelbo, for which he paid 1000 merks.

He held extensive properties in Morayshire and Sutherland and this drew the attention of George Sinclair, 4th Earl of Caithness who entered into an alliance with Sutherland of Duffus on 20 July 1559. At the time Alexander Sutherland of Duffus' son, also called Alexander, was only about five years old. It was agreed that Sutherland of Duffus' eldest son or his brothers' eldest son in succession should marry Elizabeth Sinclair, daughter of George, 4th Earl of Caithness. Alexander Sutherland of Duffus subsequently supported the Earl of Caithness in political matters and became mixed up in his disputes with his neighbors. Sutherland's brothers seized Berriedale Castle on 23 December 1565, and held it against Laurence Oliphant, 3rd Lord Oliphant who was the rightful owner. He also supported Caithness in his attack on the town of Dornoch in 1567, and again in 1570 at the Battle of Torran-Roy where Dornoch Cathedral was subsequently burnt. Sir Robert Gordon, 1st Baronet describes Sutherland of Duffus during this event as the 'son-in-law' of Caithness but James Balfour Paul stated that this appears to be a mistake and which really applies to Alexander Sutherland's son. According to Sir Robert Gordon, it was Sutherland of Duffus who put to death the hostages who had been surrendered as surety to the Earl of Caithness by the people of Dornoch, and that Sutherland of Duffus was so overcome with remorse that he fell ill and died soon after. He was alive in March 1569-70 but there is no reference to him after that date.

== Family ==
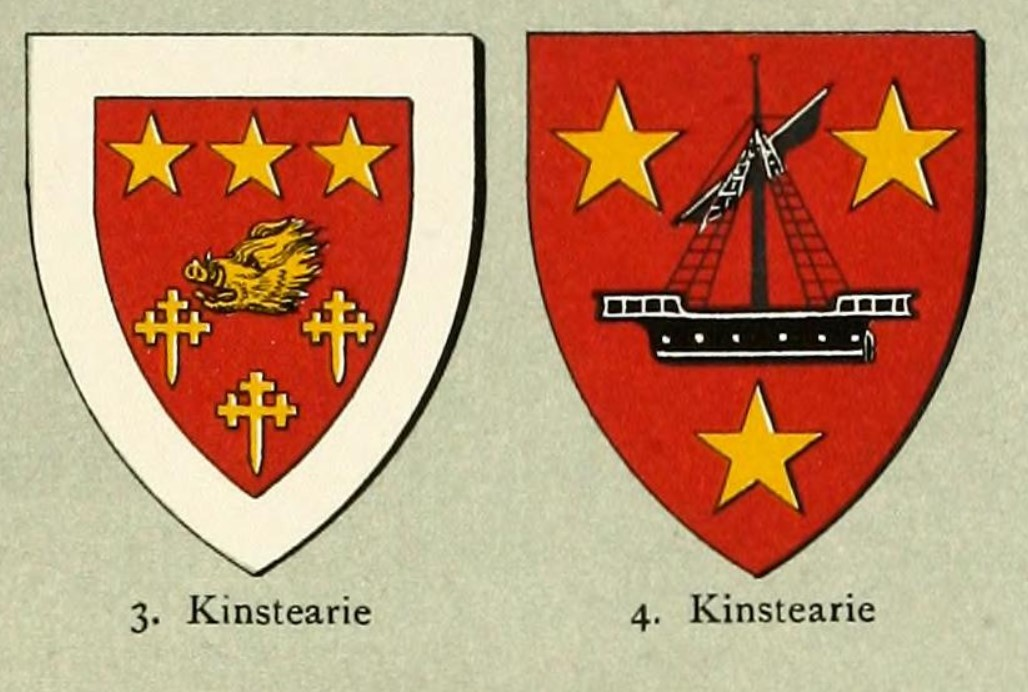
Sutherland of Kinstearie Coat of Arms

Alexander Sutherland, 8th of Duffus married by a contract dated 26 January 1552–53, while he was still under age, to Janet, third daughter of James Grant of Freuchie. Their children were:

1. Alexander Sutherland, who did not succeed to Duffus. He married Elizabeth Sinclair, daughter of the Earl of Caithness, but it is not known if he survived his father.
2. William Sutherland, 9th of Duffus, heir and successor, who married firstly, Margaret Sinclair, daughter of the Earl of Caithness and secondly, Margaret, daughter of William Mackintosh, 15th of Mackintosh, as her fourth husband.
3. James Sutherland of Kinstearie, who married Violet Fraser, the daughter of Thomas Fraser of Strichen, leaving descendants.
4. Elizabeth Sutherland, who married Archibald Douglas of Pittendriech, natural son of the Regent Morton.

== See also ==
- Lord Duffus
