= William Sutherland, 4th of Duffus =

Scottish noble

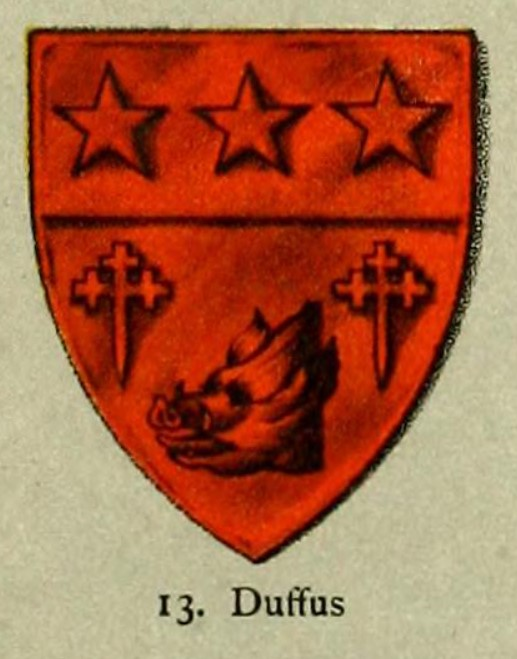
Coat of Arms of William Sutherland, 4th of Duffus

William Sutherland, 4th of Duffus (died 1513) was a member of the Scottish nobility and a cadet of the Clan Sutherland.

== Early life ==
He was the son of William Sutherland (died 1474) and the grandson of Alexander Sutherland, 3rd of Duffus. He also had an elder brother named Alexander Sutherland who died before 8 October 1478, and so William succeeded to the estate of Duffus.

== Dispute to title ==
William Sutherland, 4th of Duffus had a niece, Christina Sutherland, who was the daughter of his brother Alexander. After she married William Oliphant she disputed the right to the title of Duffus. She had powerful friends and the issue was long debated in the ecclesiastical courts in both Scotland and Rome. The matter was finally settled in about 1507 in a contract which favoured William Sutherland and in which Christina's son, George Oliphant, signed over his rights to the estates to William Sutherland who subsequently received a Crown charter for the lands of Duffus.

== Death ==
According to George Harvey Johnstone writing in 1910, William Sutherland, 4th of Duffus died before February 1513–14. According to James Balfour Paul's 1906 The Scots Peerage, he may have been killed fighting at the Battle of Flodden which took place on 8 September 1513.

== Family ==
According to James Balfour Paul's The Scots Peerage, William Sutherland's wife may have been a Janet Innes Lady Greeship, said to be the daughter of the family of Innes, who as a widow remarried before 1517 to Hugh Rose of Kilravock. William Sutherland, 4th of Duffus is known to have left one son, William Sutherland, 5th of Duffus.

== See also ==
- Lord Duffus
