= Alexander Sutherland, 1st Lord Duffus =

17th C Scottish Noble of Clan Sutherland

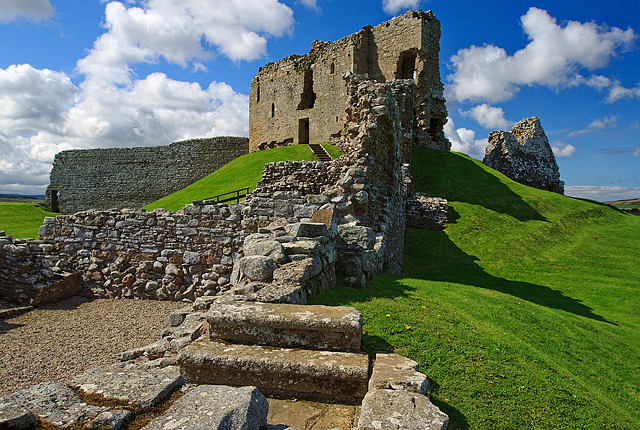
Ruins of Duffus Castle, seat of Alexander Sutherland, 1st Lord Duffus

Alexander Sutherland (died 1674) was the 1st Lord Duffus, a member of the Scottish nobility and a cadet of the Clan Sutherland.

== Early life ==
He was the eldest son of William Sutherland, 10th of Duffus and his wife Jean, daughter of John Grant of Freuchie. He was only four years old when he succeeded his father as the Laird of Duffus on 11 January 1627. His uncle, James Sutherland, was served as his tutor on the same day.

== Lord Duffus ==
In 1641, after the Scottish army had invaded England and occupied Newcastle upon Tyne, the Sutherland Laird of Duffus joined the Earl of Sutherland on a visit to the camp but returned with the earl's train to attend the Parliament at Edinburgh in July, 1641. The Laird of Duffus was also at Edinburgh in August 1641, to greet Charles I of England when he paid a visit to Scotland and the Laird of Duffus appears to have been knighted by the King as in 1643 he is styled as Sir Alexander, appearing on various Parliamentary Committees. He was also a Commissioner for Sutherland in 1646.

He was a supporter of the National Covenant and as a result his estates, probably those in Morayshire, were attacked by the Royalists. Therefore, in 1647, he petitioned to Parliament for compensation of £10,000 Scots to be paid to himself and £2000 Scots to be paid to his uncle, James Sutherland, by the English Parliament.

His wife died in 1648 and so he traveled abroad through France and Holland, returning with Charles II of England on June 24, 1650. When he attended the Parliament held at Perth in 1651, he was styled as a Peer with the title of Lord Duffus.

He was not part of the Scottish army that subsequently marched to England, but was sent from Stirling to Perth to defend it from the attack of Oliver Cromwell, but was forced to surrender the town which he had only occupied for twelve hours previously with just 600 men.

After the Restoration of Charles II, Lord Duffus went to London where he received letters from Archibald Campbell, 9th Earl of Argyll, then the Lord of Lorne. However, one of these letters was intercepted by John Middleton, 1st Earl of Middleton who was then the Lord High Commissioner to the Parliament of Scotland and Lord Duffus admitted that the author of the letter, which was written anonymously, was the Lord of Lorne who was as a result condemned to death for High treason.

Alexander Sutherland, 1st Lord Duffus died on August 31, 1674.

== Family ==
He married four times. His first wife was Jean, daughter and co-heiress of Colin Mackenzie, 1st Earl of Seaforth and who was also the widow of John Sinclair, Master of Berriedale. She died on March 31, 1648, having apparently had four sons by her second husband. His second wife was Jean, fifth daughter of Robert Innes of Innes who he married on January 13, 1653, and who died on March 10 the same year. His third wife was Margaret, daughter of James Stuart, 4th Earl of Moray and who died in January 1667. His fourth wife was Margaret, eldest daughter of William, 11th Lord Forbes. She survived him and later remarried to Sir Robert Gordon, 3rd Baronet. Lord Duffus had four sons by his first wife who were all alive on March 31, 1648, but his only recorded children are:

1. James Sutherland, 2nd Lord Duffus, heir and successor.
2. Margaret Sutherland, named in her father's will.
3. Henrietta Sutherland, named in her father's will and later married to George Livingstone, 4th Earl of Linlithgow, without issue.

Peerage of Scotland
| New creation | Lord Duffus; 1650–1674 | Succeeded by James Sutherland |
