= Alexander Sutherland, 3rd of Duffus =

Scottish noble (d. 1482)

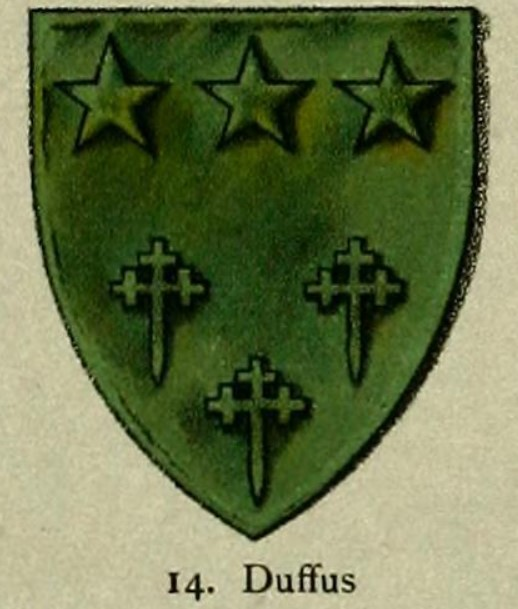
Coat of Arms of Alexander Sutherland, 3rd of Duffus before being merged with Chisholm's

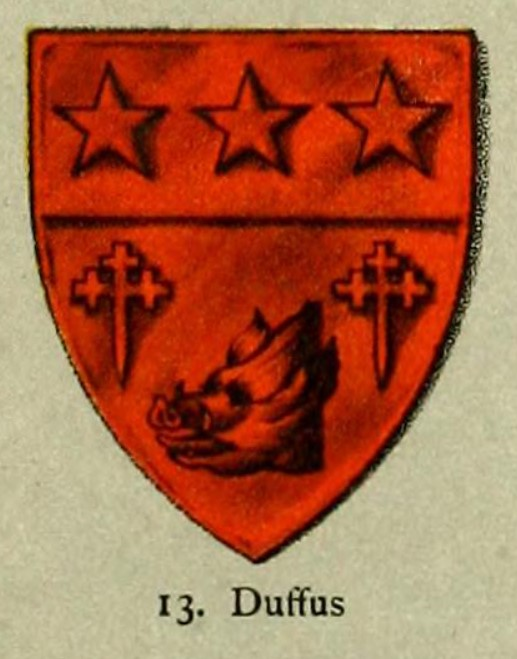
Coat of Arms of Alexander Sutherland, 3rd of Duffus after being merged with Chisholm's

Alexander Sutherland, 3rd of Duffus (died 1482) was a Scottish member of the nobility and a cadet of the Clan Sutherland.

== Laird of Duffus ==
He was the son of Henry Sutherland of Torboll and Margaret Mureff or Moray. His uncle was John Sutherland, 2nd of Duffus (1408-1427) and his grandfather was Nicholas Sutherland, 1st of Duffus. He succeeded his father in Torboll and his uncle in Duffus. He married Murial, daughter of John Chisholm of Of that Ilk before 19 March 1433-34. From that marriage he obtained the lands of Quarrelwood and Greschip near Elgin, Moray. The marriage to Murial Chisholm also meant that Sutherland of Duffus incorporated the Chisholm arms of a boar's head into the centre of his own coat of arms.

According to James Balfour Paul's The Scots Peerage, Alexander Sutherland succeeded his father Henry in Torboll and his uncle in Duffus before 13 March 1433–34, when he granted twenty-one oxgangs in Strathbrock or Broxburn in West Lothian to Robert Crichton of Sanquhar. He also held from David Lindsay, Earl of Crawford, the lands of Ledbothy in Forfarshire which he sold in 1455 to Richard Lovell of Balumby.

In 1444, Alexander Sutherland of Duffus paid a visit to his chief, John Sutherland, 7th Earl of Sutherland who was being held hostage at Pontefract Castle in England for the ransom money of James I of Scotland. Alexander Sutherland obtained from the earl confirmation of the lands of Torboll in succession to his father and grandfather. He is referred to as Sir Alexander Sutherland of Duffus in a Crown writ dated 21 July 1541. He was alive in 1469 and 1478. According to George Harvey Johnstone writing in 1910, Alexander Sutherland, 3rd of Duffus died in 1482, but according James Balfour Paul writing in 1906, he had died some time before 1484.

== Family and descendants ==
Alexander Sutherland and Murial Chisholm's children were:

1. William Sutherland, died 1474, leaving a son, Alexander Sutherland, who died before 8 October 1478, who in turn left a daughter. William also had a son called William Sutherland, 4th of Duffus who initially succeeded in Quarrelwood and later in Duffus. This William Sutherland died before February 1513–14, and left a son, William Sutherland, 5th of Duffus who died in 1529. According to Robert Young writing in 1867, the latter was killed in a feud with the Clan Gunn in 1529 in Thurso. However, James Balfour Paul attributes this as happening to the next William Sutherland, 6th of Duffus in 1530, and this is supported by George Harvey Johnstone.
2. Angus Sutherland of Torboll, who married Christina and had Nicholas Sutherland, Donald Sutherland and Hugh Sutherland who died before 1525, having married Agnes MacLeod leaving a daughter.
3. Isabella Sutherland, who married Alexander Dunbar of Westfield.
4. Dorothea Sutherland, who married Alexander Ross of Balnagown who was killed at the Battle of Aldy Charrish on 11 June 1486. She was blamed as one of the causes of this conflict.

== See also ==
- Lord Duffus
