= Clan Sutherland =

Highland Scottish clan

- Na Sutharlanaich
- Crest: A cat-a-mountain saliant Proper
- Motto: Sans Peur (French for "Without Fear")
- Slogan: Ceann na Drochaide Bige! (The Head of The Little Bridge)

Profile
- Region: Highlands
- District: Sutherland
- Plant badge: Cotton Sedge
- Pipe music: The Earl of Sutherland's March

Chief
- Alistair Charles St Clair Sutherland
- The 25th Earl of Sutherland
- Seat: House of Tongue (Tongue, Sutherland)
- Historic seat: Dunrobin Castle
Septs of Clan Sutherland
Cheney, Cheyne, Clyne, Duffes, Duffus, Federith, Gray, Keith (Note: The Keiths who were septs of the Clan Sutherland were in fact a branch of the Clan Keith of Aberdeenshire who had settled in Sutherland and Caithness.), Mouat, Mowat, Mowatt, Moray, Murray,
Clan branches
Earl of Sutherland (chiefs)
Sutherland of Duffus (senior cadets)
Sutherland of Killipheder (Agnatic seniority)
Sutherland of Forse
Sutherland of Dunbeath
Sutherland of Langwell (first creation)
Sutherland of Achastle
Sutherland of Langwell (second creation)
Sutherland of Kinsteary
Sutherland of Skibo Castle
Sutherland of Clyne
Sutherland of Uppat
Sutherland of St. Vincent
Sutherland of Dirlot
Sutherland of Skelbo
Sutherland of Sciberscross
Sutherland of Achastle
Sutherland of Ackergill
Sutherland of Thurston
Sutherland of Tormsdale
Sutherland of Dale
Sutherland of Achleepster
Sutherland of Blarich
Sutherland of Grove Villa
Sutherland of Brabster
Sutherland of Barrogill
Sutherland of Braegrudie
Sutherland of Cambusavie
Sutherland of Golsary
Sutherland of Pronsie
Sutherland of Culmaillie
Sutherland of Evelix
Sutherland of Geise
Sutherland of Greenhall
Sutherland of Inchfuir
Sutherland of Inverchassley
Sutherland of Kame
Sutherland of Kinminitie
Sutherland of Kinnauld
Sutherland of Meikleferry
Sutherland of Midgarty
Sutherland of Morvich
Sutherland of Mosstowie
Sutherland of Pitfuir
Sutherland of Pulrossie
Sutherland of Rearquhar
Sutherland of Reisgill
Sutherland of Roscommon
Sutherland of Rosehaugh
Sutherland of Strabrock
Sutherland of Swinzie
Sutherland of Torboll
Sutherland of Udale
Sutherland-Walker
Sutherland of Wester
Sutherland of Thornton
Sutherland-Graeme
Sutherland of Downside
Sutherland of Windbrech
There were also numerous landed branches of the Gordon family in Sutherland after they succeeded as the Earls of Sutherland in the early 16th century.
Allied clans
Clan Murray (13th to 16th centuries)
Clan Oliphant (16th century)
Clan Gordon (16th century)
Clan Mackay (18th century)
Clan Gunn (18th century)
Clan Sinclair (18th century)
Clan Munro
Clan Matheson
Clan MacNeacail
Rival clans
Clan Murray (18th century)
Clan Gordon (18th century)
Clan Mackay (14th, 15th & 16th centuries)
Clan Gunn (16th century)
Clan Sinclair (16th century)

Clan Sutherland also known as House of Sutherland is a Highland Scottish clan whose traditional territory is the shire of Sutherland in the far north of Scotland. The chief of the clan was also the powerful Earl of Sutherland; however, in the early 16th century, this title passed through marriage to a younger son of the chief of Clan Gordon. The current chief is Alistair Sutherland, who holds the title Earl of Sutherland.

== Chief ==
The current Clan Chief is Alistair Charles St. Clair Sutherland, 25th Earl of Sutherland, son of late Elizabeth Millicent Sutherland, 24th Countess of Sutherland.

Since 2022, the heir presumptive of the chief is his elder daughter, Lady Rachel Elizabeth Sutherland, Mistress of Sutherland, after the premature death of Alexander Charles Robert Sutherland, Lord Strathnaver, only son of the 25th Earl.

== History ==
=== Origins of the clan ===
The progenitor of the Clan Sutherland was a Flemish nobleman by the name of Freskin, who was also the progenitor of the Clan Murray. It has been claimed that Freskin was Pictish but it is much more likely that he was a Flemish knight, one of a ruthless group of warlords who were employed by the Norman kings to pacify their new realm after the Norman conquest of England. David I of Scotland who was brought up in the English court, employed such men to keep hold of the wilder parts of his kingdom and granted to Freskin lands in West Lothian. The ancient Pictish kingdom of Moray (Moireabh in Scottish Gaelic) was also given to Freskin and this put an end to the remnants of that old royal house. In a series of astute political moves Freskin and his sons inter married with the old house of Moray to consolidate their power. Freskin's descendants were designated by the surname de Moravia ("of Moray" in the Norman language). Freskin's grandson was Hugh de Moravia who was granted lands in Sutherland and was known as Lord de Sudrland. Hugh's younger brother, William de Moravia of Petty, was progenitor of the Clan Murray. (Note: The chiefs of the Clan Sutherland and Clan Murray shared a common ancestor in the direct male line. The surname of both families was originally "de Moravia" meaning "of Moray" or "of Murray" and as a result there were some people by the name of Murray who were septs of the Clan Sutherland in the far north. Most notably the Murrays or Morays of Aberscross who were the principal vassals of the Earl of Sutherland and were charged with the defense of the shire.) Hugh's eldest son (also called William) was William de Moravia, 1st Earl of Sutherland. The place name and clan name of "Sutherland" came from it being the 'land to the south' of the Norse Earldom of Orkney and Caithness. Although the senior line of chiefs who were the Earls of Sutherland had the surname 'de Moravia', they often used the territorial surname 'Sutherland', and from Robert, 6th Earl (d. 1444) onward it is confirmed that they used the surname Sutherland. Previously to this younger sons of the family had also taken the surname 'Sutherland', thus creating the cadet branches of the Clan Sutherland.

=== Wars of Scottish Independence ===
During the Wars of Scottish Independence, chief William de Moravia, 3rd Earl of Sutherland (William Sutherland) fought at the Battle of Bannockburn in 1314, where the English army was defeated. Kenneth de Moravia, 4th Earl of Sutherland (Kenneth Sutherland) was killed at the Battle of Halidon Hill in 1333.

William de Moravia, 5th Earl of Sutherland (William Sutherland), whose wife was Margaret, the daughter of Robert the Bruce and sister of David II of Scotland, led the clan at Kilblene where he participated in the siege of Cupar Castle Fife. William, Earl of Sutherland accompanied King David II of Scotland into England where both were captured at the Battle of Neville's Cross in 1346, by Durham. They remained in prison for over ten years before being released. John of Sutherland, the son of the Earl and Princess Margaret, was designated the heir to the Throne over Robert Stewart, who eventually became King Robert II in 1371.

=== 14th-century clan conflicts ===
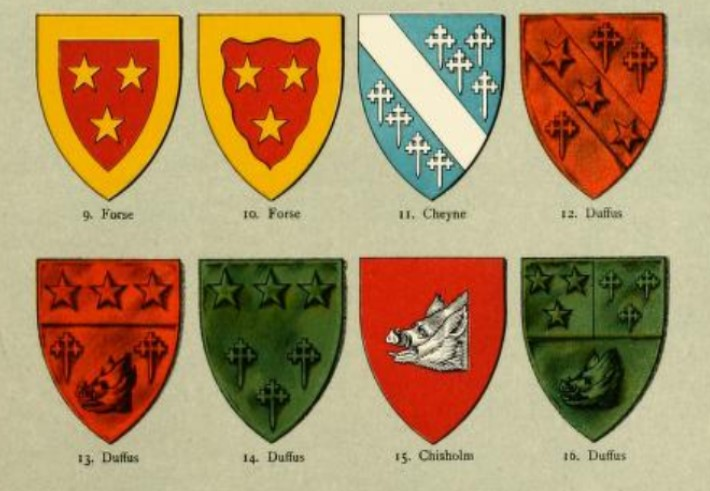
Coats of arms of the Sutherland of Forse and Sutherland of Duffus branches of the clan. Also shown is the coat of arms of the Cheynes who are considered a sept of the Clan Sutherland and the Chisholms who married into the Sutherland family

The habitual enemies of Clan Sutherland were the Clan Sinclair of Caithness and the Clan Mackay and Clan McLeod to the west of Sutherland. A feud with the Mackays came to a head when Nicholas Sutherland, 1st of Duffus, head of one of the junior branches, murdered the chief of the Clan Mackay and his heir at Dingwall Castle, where they had met in an attempt to patch up the feud. A retaliatory raid by the Mackays on Dornoch took place, where the cathedral was set on fire and many Sutherland men were hanged in the town square. William, 5th Earl of Sutherland was killed by the Mackays in 1370 in feud which lasted for the next four centuries. In 1388, the Earl of Sutherland was a leader of the Scots invading into the west of England. He married Margaret Stewart, daughter of Alexander, Earl of Buchan, a younger son of King Robert II of Scotland.

=== 15th century and clan conflicts ===
It was during the time of Robert Sutherland, 6th Earl of Sutherland that the first authentic record of Dunrobin Castle exists, dated 1401. It was also during the time of Robert Sutherland, 6th Earl of Sutherland, that the Battle of Drumnacoub was fought in 1431 where Angus Du Mackay, chief of Clan Mackay defeated Angus Murray and the Sutherlanders on the slopes of the mountain Ben Loyal near Tongue, as described by 17th-century historian Sir Robert Gordon, 1st Baronet. This battle is also mentioned by the historians George Buchanan (1506-1582) and the 18th century John Pinkerton who quoted the 15th century chronicler, Walter Bower. Henry Sutherland of Torboll, received from Robert Sutherland, 6th Earl of Sutherland the £40 lands of Torboll which Henry's father, Nicholas Sutherland, 1st of Duffus had resigned to the earl. Henry Sutherland's son was Alexander Sutherland, 3rd of Duffus who visited his chief, John Sutherland, 7th Earl of Sutherland who was being held hostage at Pontefract Castle in England for the ransom money of James I of Scotland. According to Gordon, during the time of John Sutherland, 7th Earl of Sutherland, the Battle of Skibo and Strathfleet was fought where John MacDonald of Islay, Earl of Ross invaded Sutherland and was defeated by the Clan Sutherland, led by the earl's brother Robert Sutherland, and the Murrays of Aberscross.

According to Gordon, during the time of John Sutherland, 8th Earl of Sutherland, the Clan Sutherland joined the Clan Mackay in their victory over the Clan Ross at the Battle of Aldy Charrish in 1487. However, 19th - 20th-century historian Angus Mackay disputes the Sutherland's presence at the battle stating that it would be unlikely that the Earl of Sutherland at the time would have assisted against the Rosses as he was married to a daughter of the Ross chief of Balnagowan, and also that the feudal superiority of the Sutherlands over the Mackays "nowhere existed save in his own fertile imagination".

=== 16th century and clan conflicts ===
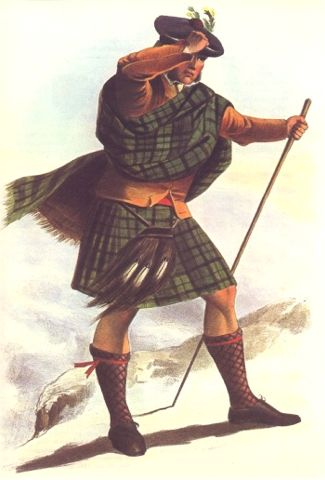
A Victorian era, romanticised depiction of a member of the clan by R. R. McIan, from The Clans of the Scottish Highlands, published in 1845.

William Sutherland, 4th of Duffus was killed fighting against the English at the Battle of Flodden in 1513.

In 1517, Elizabeth Sutherland, 10th Countess of Sutherland married Adam Gordon, younger son of Gordon of Huntly. Their son was Alexander Gordon, Master of Sutherland who would become the legal heir to the Earldom of Sutherland and overall chiefship of the Clan Sutherland. According to Sir Robert Gordon, who himself was a son of Alexander Gordon, 12th Earl of Sutherland, in the same year the Mackays rose up against the Gordons who had taken power in Sutherland which resulted in the Battle of Torran Dubh, where the Mackays were defeated. Sir Robert Gordon also states that at the battle, the Sutherland force had been led by Alexander Sutherland, brother of Elizabeth, 10th Countess of Sutherland. However, this version of events is disputed by both historian Angus Mackay and historian Sir William Fraser, who state that it can be proved that Alexander Sutherland was in prison in 1517 when the battle is supposed to have taken place. Whatever the truth, the following year in 1518 or 1519, Alexander Sutherland claimed the Earldom of Sutherland for himself and rose up against his sister Elizabeth, 10th Countess of Sutherland and her husband Adam Gordon, but he was defeated and killed at the Battle of Alltachuilain. On March 25, 1525, Elizabeth Sutherland, 10th Countess of Sutherland and her husband Adam Gordon granted to William Sutherland, 5th of Duffus the lands of Torboll and Pronsy which had previously belonged to the late Hugh Sutherland of Pronsy.

William Sutherland, 6th of Duffus, as the new Laird of Skelbo and having entered into a fresh acquisition of territory gave a bond of manrent to Alexander Gordon, Master of Sutherland on September 4, 1529, which acknowledged that the Master of Sutherland had received him as a tenant and vassal in the lands.

According to the book Conflicts of the Clans which was published in 1764, in 1542 the Battle of Alltan-Beath took place where the Clan Mackay were defeated by the Clan Sutherland. According to historian Sir Robert Gordon, in 1542, chief Donald Mackay, 11th of Strathnaver was captured by the Gordon Earls of Sutherland and Huntly, and imprisoned in Foulis Castle. However, this is disputed by historian Angus Mackay.

In 1545, at Dingwall, the Earl of Sutherland entered into a bond of manrent with John Mackenzie of Kintail for mutual defense against all enemies, reserving only their allegiance to the youthful Mary, Queen of Scots.

In 1547, John Gordon, 11th Earl of Sutherland led the clan against the English army at the Battle of Pinkie Cleugh.

In 1555, the Battle of Garbharry was fought, which was the last battle between the Clan Mackay and the Clan Sutherland. In 1586, the Battle of Leckmelm took place where the Sutherlands, Mackays and MacLeods defeated the Clan Gunn.

Alexander Sutherland, 8th of Duffus supported George Sinclair, 4th Earl of Caithness at the Battle of Torran-Roy in 1570 against the Murrays of Aberscross who were the principal vassals of Alexander Gordon, 12th Earl of Sutherland. William Sutherland, 9th of Duffus ratified the existing bond that his great-grandfather William Sutherland, 6th of Duffus had entered into with Alexander Gordon, Master of Sutherland, a writ that related to the barony of Skelbo, which he held from the Earls of Sutherland.

In 1588, Castle Sinclair Girnigoe withstood a siege by the Earl of Sutherland and in 1590 George Sinclair, 5th Earl of Caithness, invaded Sutherland resulting in the Battle of Clynetradwell.

=== 17th century and Civil War ===
In the 17th century the Clan Sutherland began to acquire the reputation for enthusiastic and pious Protestantism. This is probably what made the Gordon Earls of Sutherland begin to distance themselves from their Gordon Earl of Huntly (Clan Gordon) cousins who were Catholics and later Jacobites. In 1645, John Gordon, 14th Earl of Sutherland led the clan against the Royalists at the Battle of Auldearn but was defeated. Alexander Sutherland, 1st Lord Duffus was a supporter of the National Covenant and as a result his estates, probably those in Morayshire, were attacked by the Royalists. He was not part of the Scottish army that subsequently marched to England, but was sent from Stirling to Perth to defend it from the attack of Oliver Cromwell, but was forced to surrender the town which he had only occupied for twelve hours previously with just 600 men.

In 1650, the Clan Sutherland along with the Clan Munro and the Clan Ross joined forces with the Scottish Argyll Government to fight against James Graham, 1st Marquess of Montrose and his royalist army of foreigners, who they defeated at the Battle of Carbisdale.

In 1685, John Gordon, 16th Earl of Sutherland, raised men of the Clan Sutherland to oppose Archibald Campbell, 9th Earl of Argyll's expedition that was known as Argyll's Rising. The Earl of Sutherland also raised two regiments from the clan after the Glorious Revolution of 1688. The second of which he was a Colonel in command in Flanders in 1694.

=== 18th century and Jacobite risings ===
==== Jacobite rising of 1715 ====
During the Jacobite rising of 1715, John Gordon, 16th Earl of Sutherland who later resumed the surname Sutherland, called out his men to fight for George I of Great Britain. The Clan Sutherland garrisoned Inverness Castle against the Jacobites. Although Kenneth Sutherland, 3rd Lord Duffus had voted for the Acts of Union 1707, he still supported the Jacobites during the Jacobite rising of 1715 and was forfeited as a result.

==== Jacobite rising of 1719 ====
In 1719, a detachment of men from the Clan Sutherland fought for the British Government at the Battle of Glenshiel where they helped to defeat the Jacobites. The Earl and chief of Clan Sutherland had been of the surname Gordon ever since the early 16th century, however John Gordon, 16th Earl of Sutherland resumed the surname of Sutherland, and was officially recognized as chief of Clan Sutherland by the Court of the Lord Lyon in 1719. General Wade's report on the Highlands in 1724, estimated the clan strength at 1,000 men.

==== Jacobite rising of 1745 ====
The Clan Sutherland also supported the British Government during the Jacobite rising of 1745. At the start of the rising William Sutherland, 17th Earl of Sutherland and chief of Clan Sutherland reconciled with their ancient enemies, the Mackays, settling the ancient feud. In 1745, the fighting force of the Clan Sutherland was given as 2,000 men. During the rising, Jacobites under George Mackenzie, 3rd Earl of Cromartie occupied the Sutherland's Dunrobin Castle, and the Earl of Sutherland narrowly escaped them through a back door. He then sailed for Aberdeen where he joined the Duke of Cumberland's army. However, this same Jacobite force under the Earl of Cromartie was defeated by the Clan Sutherland militia, who formed an Independent Highland Company, in what became known as the Battle of Littleferry. Three companies of Sutherland local militia fought at the battle. The first was of around 80 men, captained by Robert Macallister who was a senior factor for the Earl of Sutherland and whose lieutenant was Hector Munro of Novar and ensign was John Mackay from Golspie. The second was commanded by Lieutenant William Sutherland of Sciberscross and included around 70 men. The third included around 80-100 men and was captained by Robert Gray who was another factor to the Earl of Sutherland. However, despite all these efforts by the Earl of Sutherland to defeat the Jacobites, including his victory at Littleferry, he struggled to prove to the parliament in London that he had not had Jacobite sympathies. Eric Sutherland, 4th Lord Duffus remained loyal to the Crown and gave intelligence of the rebels to the Earl of Sutherland. According to James Balfour Paul, he did not take part in any military operations. According to William Fraser, he was a captain in the Earl of Sutherland's regiment. James Balfour Paul stated that Eric Sutherland, 4th Lord Duffus' relations with the Earl of Sutherland's family were extremely friendly.

== Disputed chiefship ==
The chief of Clan Sutherland was the Earl of Sutherland. When William Sutherland, 18th Earl of Sutherland died in 1766 he left an only daughter, Elizabeth. This led to a legal battle over the succession to the title. Elizabeth's right to succeed as a woman was challenged firstly by George Sutherland of Forse, who was a direct male descendant of the original de Moravia/Sutherland Earls of Sutherland and secondly by Sir Robert Gordon of Gordonstoun who was a direct male descendant of the later Gordon Earls of Sutherland. The case was heard by the House of Lords on 21 March 1771 and it decided in favour of Elizabeth. She married George Leveson-Gower, Marquess of Stafford who later became the first Duke of Sutherland in 1833. The Duke set up businesses on the coast and ruthlessly cleared his tenants off the land, though had philanthropic intentions common to the day. However, two tacksmen of the clan, the brothers Alexander and John Sutherland of Sciberscross, were opposed to the clearance of tenants in Sutherland. Alexander Sutherland of Sciberscross, an army officer, fiercely opposed the clearances and was the source of much of the London press's critical coverage of the clearance events in Sutherland. His brother, John Sutherland of Sciberscross, gave "covert aid" in 1813 to the Kildonan rebels opposing the clearances in Sutherland.

Upon the death of the fifth Duke of Sutherland, the chiefship of the clan and the earldom of Sutherland devolved upon his niece, Elizabeth Sutherland, 24th Countess of Sutherland.

== Castles ==
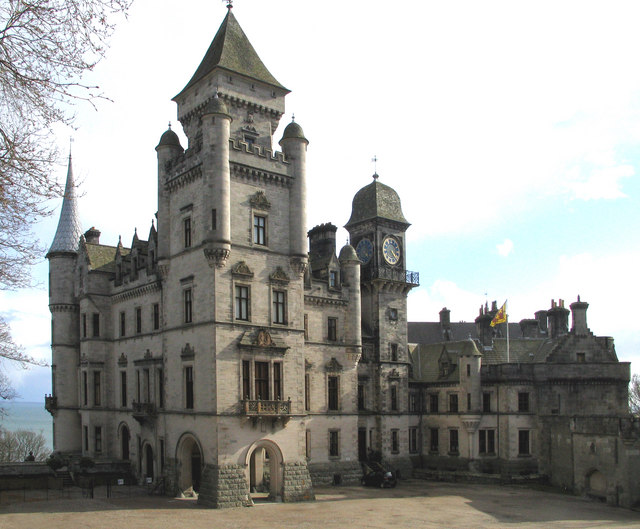
Dunrobin Castle, historic seat of the Earls of Sutherland, chiefs of Clan Sutherland

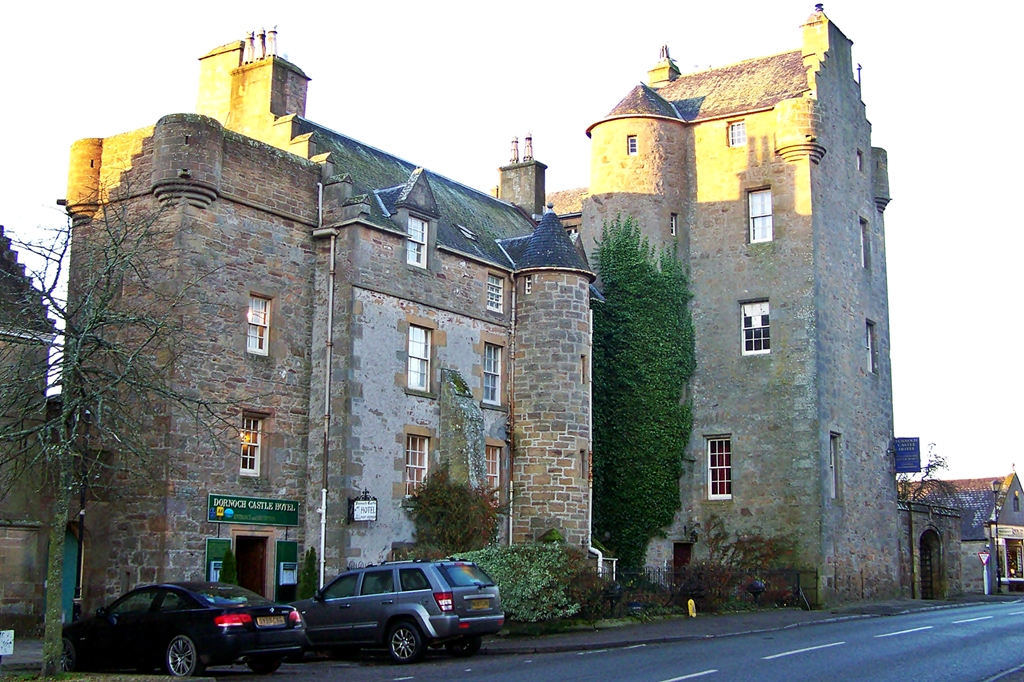
Dornoch Castle, also known as Dornoch Palace, held by the Earls of Sutherland in the 16th century, it is now a hotel

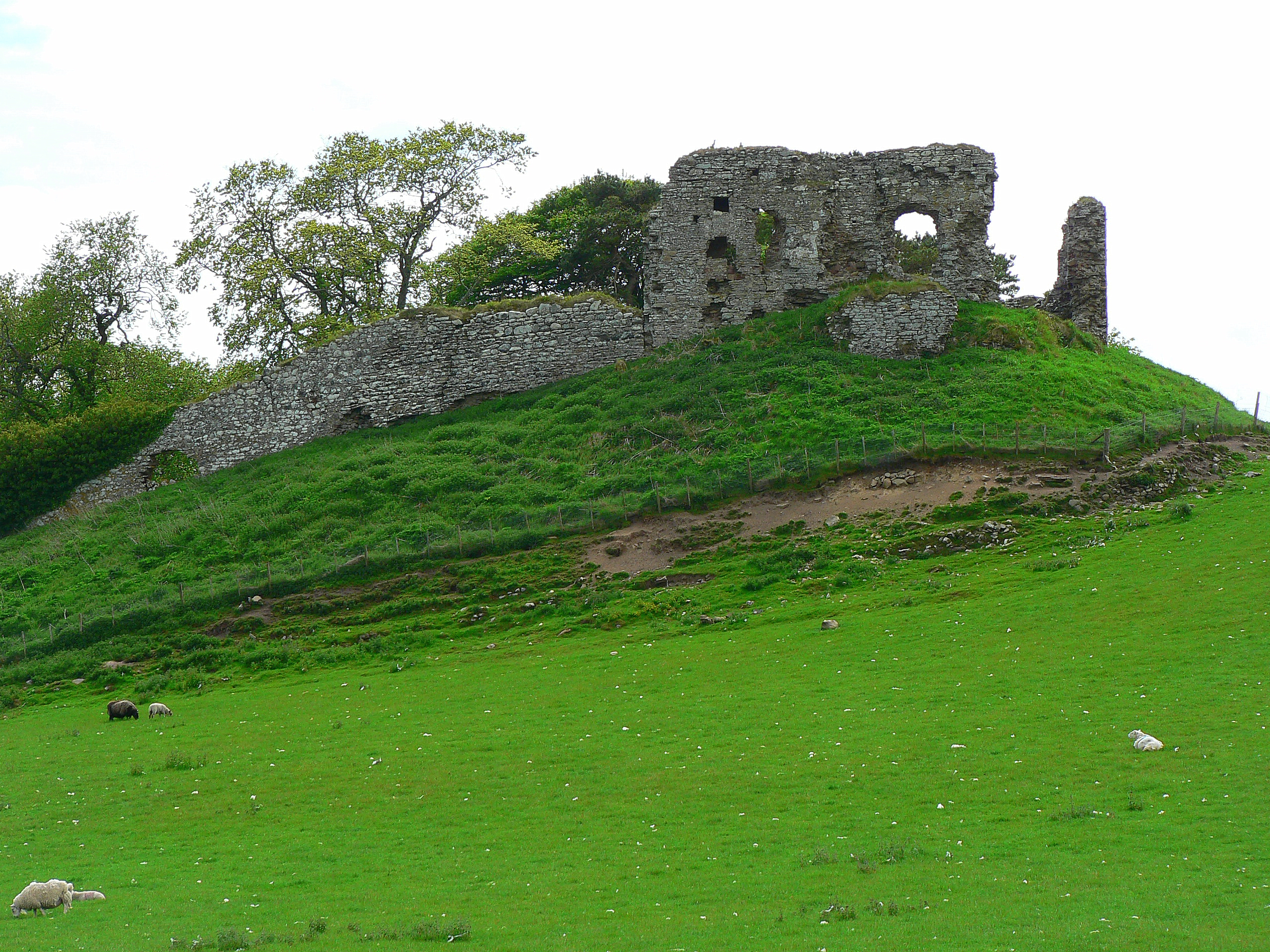
Ruins of Skelbo Castle, Sutherland, former seat of the Sutherlands of Skelbo

Castles that have been owned by the Clan Sutherland include amongst many others:

- Dunrobin Castle, a mile to the north of Golspie, Sutherland is the historic seat of the Earls of Sutherland, chiefs of Clan Sutherland. The current castle was developed out of an old stronghold that was remodeled in modern times by Robert Lorimer. During World War I the castle was used as a naval hospital and between 1963 and 1972 as a public boys school. The castle is said to be haunted by the ghost of a girl although there are different stories behind her appearance. One is that she fell to her death from an upstairs window when she tried to elope with her lover and another that she was seized by one of the earls who desired her, but she refused him and also fell to her death. Dunrobin Castle is still held by the Countess of Sutherland although she resides at the House of Tongue in Sutherland and also in London.
- House of Tongue, about a mile north of Tongue, Sutherland is now the property of the Countess of Sutherland but was previously held by the Mackay Lords Reay. There was once a tower house that belonged to the Clan Mackay but the present mansion dates from 1678.
- Dornoch Castle, also known as Dornoch Palace, was originally held by the Bishops of Caithness but passed to the Earls of Sutherland after the Protestant Reformation. In 1567, George Sincliar, 4th Earl of Caithness had the town and cathedral burnt, and the castle besieged in order to secure possession of the young Earl of Sutherland. However, it is also said that Sutherland was abducted from Skibo Castle. Dornoch Castle held out in the siege for a month, surrendering on fair terms, but the hostages that were given by the garrison were subsequently murdered. The castle was then burnt and left in a ruin until it was restored as a court house and jail in the nineteenth century. The castle is said to be haunted and there are also stories of a tunnel linking it to the nearby cathedral. The castle is now a hotel.
- Duffus Castle, near Elgin, Moray, was the seat of the Sutherland of Duffus branch of the clan. It was originally built by Freskin, Lord of Strathbrock, from whom both the Sutherlands and Murrays are descended. Duffus passed from Freskin to the Cheynes but went to the Sutherlands by marriage in 1350. The Sutherlands held the lands until 1843. At the end of the seventeenth century the Sutherlands abandoned the castle for nearby Duffus House. The Sutherlands of Duffus have a burial aisle at nearby St Peter's Church.
- Forse Castle, near Dunbeath, Caithness, was the seat of the Sutherland of Forse branch of the clan. The castle was abandoned in the eighteenth century and Forse House was built in 1753.
- Golspie Tower, Golspie, Sutherland, the site of a large tower held by the Earls of Sutherland.
- Helmsdale Castle, Helmsdale, Sutherland, site of a castle held by the Earls of Sutherland. It was at Helmsdale Castle that Isobel Sinclair, aunt of the Earl of Sutherland poisoned John Gordon, 11th Earl of Sutherland and his wife, in order make her own son the earl. She also attempted to poison the earl's heir but the cup of poison was actually drunk by her own son who died two days later. She killed herself before being executed in Edinburgh. This affair was a plot apparently hatched by George Sinclair, 4th Earl of Caithness.
- Langwell Castle, Latheron, Caithness, was held by the Earls of Sutherland but was replaced by Langwell House, a mansion, in the eighteenth century. The property was sold to the Sinclairs in 1788 and then to the Dukes of Portland who still own and occupy it.
- Skelbo Castle, near Dornoch, Sutherland, is now a ruinous castle that was held by the Sutherlands of Skelbo. In 1308, the castle was captured by Robert the Bruce. The Sutherlands of Skelbo acquired the Lordship of Duffus in the fourteenth century. This Sutherland family were forfeited for their part in the Jacobite rising of 1715 and the property then passed to the Earls of Sutherland.
- Clyne, near Brora, Sutherland is the site of a castle that was once held by the Clyne family but passed to the Sutherlands in 1550 who still owned the property in the middle of the eighteenth century.
- Berriedale Castle, at Berriedale, near Dunbeath in Caithness was originally held by the Cheynes in the fourteenth century but passed by marriage to the Sutherlands. It had passed to the Clan Oliphant by 1526 and in 1606 to the Sinclair Earl of Caithness.
- Cnoc Chaisteal, near Dornoch, Sutherland is the site of a castle that was believed to have been built by the Sutherlands of Evelix in about 1570.
- Skibo Castle, near Dornoch, Sutherland, is now a mansion on the site of a castle. The castle has been held by the Mackays, Grays, Dowalls and the Dempsters of Dunnichen. It was remodeled for the Sutherlands in 1872 but was purchased by Andrew Carnegie in 1895. It is now an exclusive country club.
- Aberscross Castle near Dornoch, Sutherland was the seat of the Murrays or Morrays of Aberscross, a sept of the Clan Sutherland, they were the principal vassals of the Earl of Sutherland and were charged with the defense of the shire. Their name appears predominantly on the front line in the feuds with the Mackays and Sinclairs. Aberscross Castle fell into ruin in the 17th century. (The name of the original line of Earls of Sutherland was "de Moravia" which means "of Moray" or "of Murray"). Aberscross Castle was held by the de Moravia (Murray) family from when they first moved to Sutherland at the end of the twelfth century.

== Clan Profile ==
- Gaelic Names: Suithearlarach (Singular) & Na Suithearlaraichean (Collective)
- Motto: "Sans Peur" (French for "Without Fear")
- Slogan: "Ceann na Drochaide Bige!" (Gaelic for "The Head of the Little Bridge!")
- Pipe Music: "The Earl of Sutherland's March"
- Crest: A cat-a-mountain saliant Proper
- Supporters: Two savages wreathed head and middle with laurel, holding batons in their hands proper.
- Plant Badge: Butcher's Broom, Cotton Sedge
- Animal Symbol: Cat.
- Arms (Earl of Sutherland as recorded for the fifteenth Earl, 1719):
- Shield: Gules, three mullets Or, on a bordure of the second a double tressure flory counterflory of the first.

== Tartans ==
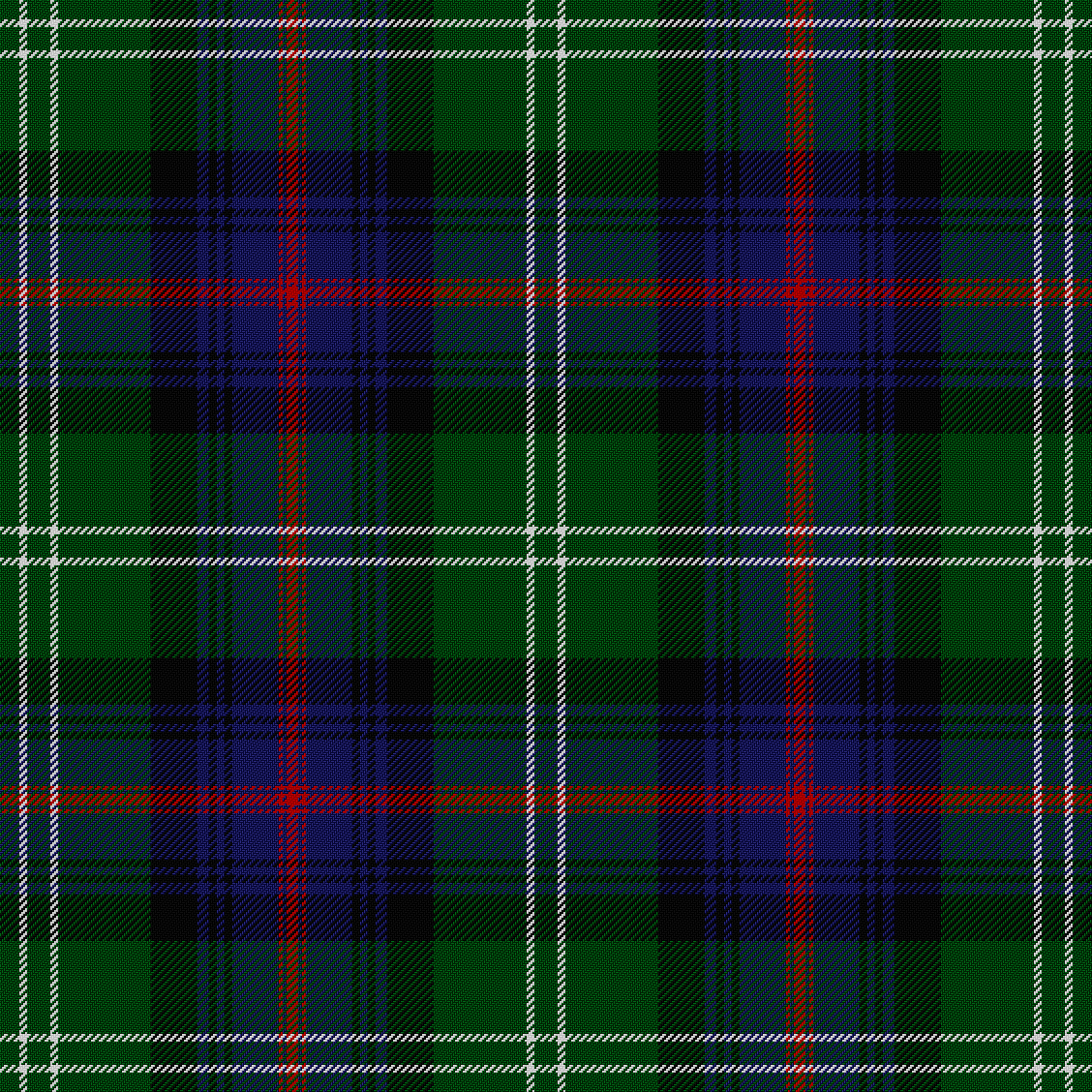
Clan Sutherland tartan.

- Sutherland
- Old Sutherland
- Old Sutherland (Dress)
