= James Sutherland, 2nd Lord Duffus =

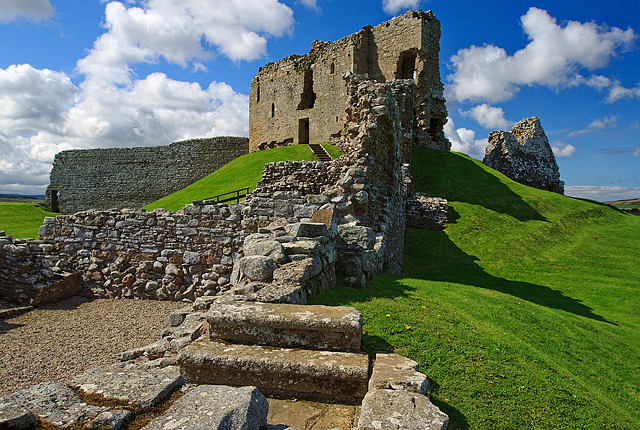
Ruins of Duffus Castle, seat of the Sutherlands of Duffus until the death of James Sutherland, 2nd Lord Duffus in 1705

James Sutherland (died 1705) was the 2nd Lord Duffus, member of the Scottish nobility and a cadet of the Clan Sutherland.

== Early life ==
He was the eldest son of Alexander Sutherland, 1st Lord Duffus and his wife Jean, daughter and co-heiress of Colin Mackenzie, 1st Earl of Seaforth and who was also the widow of John Sinclair, Master of Berriedale. He succeeded his father in 1674.

== Lord Duffus ==
He was served heir to his father on 10 November 1674. He attended the Parliament of Scotland in 1678, 1681 and 1685. He became a Privy Councillor of Scotland in 1686. He was considerably in debt and sold or mortgaged his estates to his second son. In 1688, he was put under pressure for payment to one of his creditors, William Ross the younger of Kindeace, and while they were walking together between Balnagowan and the ferry of Inverbreakie, Lord Duffus killed William Ross by running him through with a sword. He then fled to England, where he remained until his friends had arranged a remission for him from the Crown. His mother, Lady Mackenzie of Seaforth wrote to him to say that "Many a man has fallen in such ane accident worse than your circumstances was, yet has been at peace with God and all the world, and lived very happily for all that". His remission was not long delayed as on 16 March 1689 he was among those who subscribed to the act declaring the legality of the meeting of the Estates summoned by the Prince of Orange, and on 15 April 1690 he also took the oath of allegiance to the Prince as William III of England.

In 1695, an Act was passed which gave him the privilege of having two yearly fairs and a weekly market at Duffus. He voted in favour of the Darien scheme in 1701, and was against an increase of the forces.

James Sutherland, 2nd Lord Duffus died on 24 September 1705.

== Family ==
He married by contract Margaret, eldest daughter of Kenneth Mackenzie, 3rd Earl of Seaforth on 5 September 1674. She survived him less than a year dying in August 1706. Their children were:

1. Kenneth Sutherland, 3rd Lord Duffus, heir and successor.
2. James Sutherland, who later assumed the surname Dunbar. According to one account, he acquired the Duffus estates from his father and obtained the purchase money by loan from Mr Archibald Dunbar of Thunderton. He could not refund the loan and was therefore obliged to part with his estates to his creditor. However, James Balfour Paul states that this account is unlikely because both James, 2nd Lord Duffus and Kenneth, 3rd Lord Duffus were parties to the transaction and Mr Archibald Dunbar obtained two decrees of adjudication on 20 February 1712, against Kenneth, 3rd Lord Duffus. James Sutherland married after 1704, to Elizabeth the only surviving child of Sir William Dunbar, 1st Baronet of Northfield and subsequently assumed the surname of Dunbar instead of Sutherland. His descendants would later succeed to the title of Duffus with the surname Dunbar.
3. William Sutherland of Roscommon, forfeited for taking part in the Jacobite rising of 1715.
4. John Sutherland.
5. Alexander Sutherland.
6. Elizabeth Sutherland.
7. Frances Sutherland.
8. Henrietta Sutherland, born 21 February 1684.
9. Mary Sutherland, who married James Sinclair of Mey, and had issue.
10. Katharine Sutherland, who married John Cuthbert, town-clerk of Inverness, and had issue.

Peerage of Scotland
Preceded by Alexander Sutherland	Lord Duffus; 1674–1705	Succeeded by Kenneth Sutherland
