= Battle of Torran-Roy =

1570 Scottish clan battle

- Part of Sutherland – Sinclair feud
- Coats of arms of the Earl of Sutherland (left) and Earl of Caithness (right)
Date	1570
Location	Torran-Roy and Dornoch, Sutherland, Scotland
Result	The Earl of Caithness’s forces under Sutherland of Duffus are initially defeated by the Murrays of Aberscross who supported the Earl of Sutherland at Torran-Roy. However, the Murrays are soon after defeated by the Earl of Caithness's forces which included the Mackays at Dornoch

Belligerents
Earldom of Caithness: Clan Sinclair; Sutherlands of Duffus; Clan Mackay	Earldom of Sutherland : Clan Sutherland

Commanders and leaders
George Sinclair; Alexander Sutherland; Iye Mackay	Alexander Gordon; Hugh Murray

The Battle of Torran-Roy was a Scottish clan battle that took place in the year 1570 in the county of Sutherland, Scotland. It was fought between the forces of Alexander Gordon, 12th Earl of Sutherland (chief of Clan Sutherland) and the forces of George Sinclair, 4th Earl of Caithness (chief of the Clan Sinclair). The Earl of Sutherland's force consisted primarily of the Murrays (or Morays) of Aberscross who despite their name were not part of the Clan Murray in Atholl, but who were a sept of the Clan Sutherland, and who as the principal vassals of the Earl of Sutherland, were charged with the defense of the shire. The Earl of Caithness's forces consisted primarily of followers of Alexander Sutherland, 8th of Duffus who was a descendant of the old Sutherland Earls of Sutherland who had been ousted and replaced by the Gordons as earls in the early 16th-century.

== Background ==
In 1570 a feud arose between the Gordon Earl of Sutherland and the Earl of Caithness, chief of Clan Sinclair. Caithness was supported by his father-in-law Alexander Sutherland, 8th of Duffus, (a descendant of the old Sutherland Earls of Sutherland). Caithness made Sutherland of Duffus's brother, William Sutherland of Evelick, attack the Murrays of Aberscors (Aberscross) in vengeance, taking prisoner John Croy-Murray. Hugh Murray of Aberscors then assembled his friends and made incursions upon the lands of Evelick as well as laying waste to several villages belonging to the Sutherland Laird of Duffus and taking hostage a Sutherland gentlemen to secure the safety of John Croy-Murray. The Sutherland Laird of Duffus then gathered all of his kinsmen at Skibo Castle and proceeded to the town of Dornoch with the intention of burning it.

== Skirmish of Torran-Roy and Siege of Dornoch ==
The Murrays went out and met the Sutherlands of Duffus in battle, overthrowing them and pursuing them back to the gates of Skibo. Prisoners were then exchanged for John Croy-Murray. This was known as the skirmish of Torran-Roy. However, on hearing of the news of the skirmish of Torran-Roy, the Earl of Caithness sent the Master of Caithness who, along with the Mackays, besieged the Murrays in Dornoch Castle and the church. The Murrays held out for a week before surrendering after which three of them were beheaded.

== Aftermath ==
George Sinclair, 4th Earl of Caithness later imprisoned his son, the Master of Caithnes, for making peace with the Murrays. In 1590 John Morray of Aberscross was killed leading the Clan Sutherland against the Earl of Caithness at the Battle of Clynetradwell.

== See also ==
- Earl of Sutherland
- Clan Sutherland
- Earl of Caithness
- Clan Sinclair
- Murray of Aberscross
