= William Sutherland, 6th of Duffus =

Scottish noble

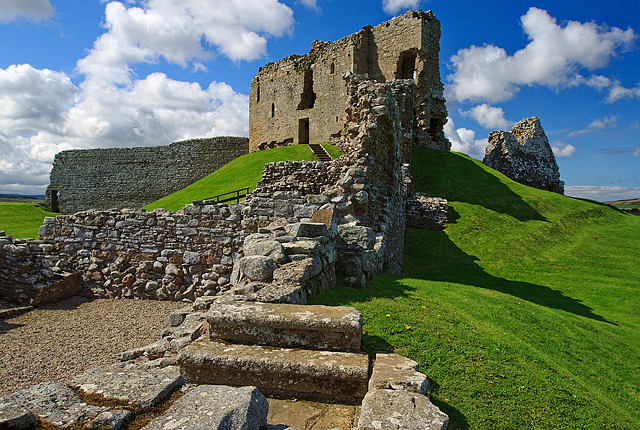
Ruins of Duffus Castle, seat of William Sutherland, 6th of Duffus

William Sutherland, 6th of Duffus (killed in 1530) was a member of the Scottish nobility and a cadet of the Clan Sutherland.

== Early life ==
He was the son of William Sutherland, 5th of Duffus (died 1529) and his wife Janet, daughter of Alexander Innes.

== Laird of Duffus ==
He succeeded his father between 22 July 1527 and 1 April 1529 when his father resigned to him the lands of Duffus. At this time he also entered into a contract with John Kynnard Of that Ilk to pay him 2300 merks by installments and for each installment he received certain lands including Skelbo to be held from the Earl of Sutherland as overlord. Kynnard also conveyed to him, the lands of Aberscors, Invershin and others with the whole sale and transfer of Skelbo finally taking place on 15 September 1529. William Sutherland, 6th of Duffus, as the new Laird of Skelbo having entered into a fresh acquisition of territory gave a bond of manrent to Alexander Gordon, Master of Sutherland on 4 September 1529, which acknowledged that the Master of Sutherland had received him as a tenant and vassal in the lands. A breach of the bond of service and manrent would incur a fine of £1500 Scots, £500 of which would have to be paid to Dornoch Cathedral, £500 to the Master of Sutherland and £500 to the King. On 31 March 1530 James V of Scotland granted to William Sutherland, 6th of Duffus the non-entry duties of the lands of Galvell, Armadale, Farr and others in Strathnaver that had previously belonged to Hugh Mackay of Farr.

== Death ==
William Sutherland, 6th of Duffus was killed sometime between March and September 1530, by the Clan Gunn at Thurso, according to Sir Robert Gordon, 1st Baronet at the instigation of Andrew Stewart who was the Bishop of Caithness. The name of William Sutherland's wife is not known, but he left one son, William Sutherland, 7th of Duffus.

== See also ==
- Lord Duffus
