= William Sutherland of Roscommon =

William Sutherland of Roscommon (died 1715), also known as William Sutherland of Mostowie, was a Member of the Parliament of Scotland from 1703 to 1706 and Provost of Elgin from 1705 to 1708. He was son of James Sutherland, 2nd Lord Duffus and married Helen Duff, the eldest daughter of William Duff of Dipple, in 1702. Sutherland owned the estates of Moostowie, Aldroughty and Quarrelwood. In 1715, his estates were forfeited for his involvement in the 1715 Jacobite uprising and he died abroad in 1716, without issue.

== Citations ==
Parliament of Scotland
Preceded by James Stewart	Burgh Commissioner for Elgin; 1702–1707	Succeeded by Parliament of Great Britain
