= River Evelix =

River in Highland, Scotland

Coordinates: 57°51′41″N 4°7′14″W

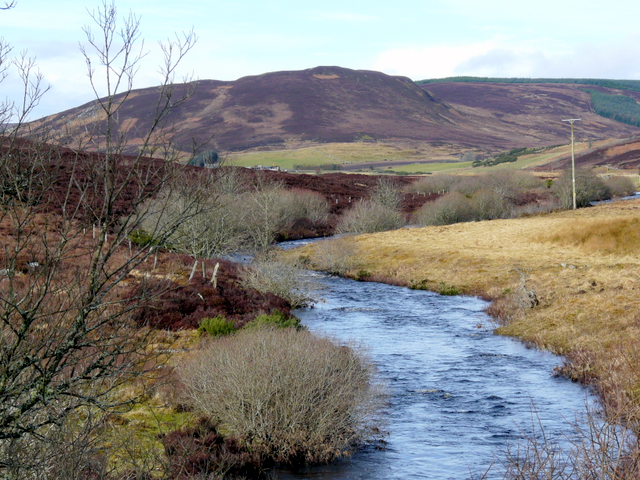
River Evelix near Rearquhar

The River Evelix (Scottish Gaelic: Èibhleag) is a river in Sutherland, Scotland. It draws water from some 30 square miles (78 km^{2}) of rugged moorland and farmland. To its south is the Kyle of Sutherland and to its west the River Shin. It passes through farmland, the village of Evelix, and the estuary of Loch Evelix. It enters the sea at Meikle Ferry on the Dornoch Firth, just west of the north end of the Dornoch Bridge.
