= George Sinclair, 4th Earl of Caithness =

Scottish nobleman

George Sinclair
- Earl of Caithness
- Earl of Caithness Coat of Arms
- Predecessor: John Sinclair, 3rd Earl of Caithness
- Successor: George Sinclair, 5th Earl of Caithness
- Died: 9 September 1582
- Noble family: Clan Sinclair
- Father: John Sinclair, 3rd Earl of Caithness
- Mother: Elizabeth Sutherland

George Sinclair (died 1582) was a Scottish nobleman, the 4th Earl of Caithness and chief of the Clan Sinclair, a Scottish clan of the Scottish Highlands.

== Early life ==
He was the son of John Sinclair, 3rd Earl of Caithness and Elizabeth, daughter of William Sutherland, 5th of Duffus.

== Earl of Caithness ==
George Sinclair, 4th Earl of Caithness resigned his earldom into the hands of Mary, Queen of Scots who in turn granted a charter to the earl's son and heir, John Sinclair, on 2 October 1545, under the reservation of life-rent and terce. He appears as a member of the Privy Council of Scotland and records of the Council show that for many years prior to 1553, there had been feuding between the Earl of Caithness and the Clan Mackay. The Council had ordered the Earl of Caithness on 18 September 1553 to meet with the Earl of Huntly who was Her Majesty's Lieutenant-General in the North, and the Bishop of Ross, at Inverness "under pain of rebellion". He met with Mary, Queen of Scots in 1555 at Inverness in order to settle disorders in that part of the country. According to Roland Saint-Clair, the earl was required to bring his countrymen with him to the court which he either neglected or declined to do and as a result he was imprisoned at Inverness, Aberdeen and Edinburgh successively, and was not released until he had paid a considerable sum of money. On 18 December 1556 George, Earl of Caithness received a remission under the Great Seal of Scotland for oppression of the lieges. He also received two charters for the office of Justicar from Portinculter to the Pentland Firth, which his predecessors had held, on 22 December 1561.

On the night of the murder of David Rizzio on 9 March 1566, the Earl of Caithness was with the party who tried to rescue the Queen, but being outnumbered retired from the contest. Two days later the Queen escaped to Dunbar Castle with Lord Darnely where they were joined by their friends including the Earl of Caithness. The Earl of Caithness's commission as Justiciary was extended on 14 May 1566. He was foreman of the trial of James Hepburn, 4th Earl of Bothwell for the murder of Lord Darnley, on 12 April 1567.

In 1570, the Battle of Torran-Roy took place between the forces of George Sinclair, 4th Earl of Caithness and Alexander Gordon, 12th Earl of Sutherland. Caithness was initially defeated by Sutherland's vassals the Murrays of Aberscross, but he returned to besiege the Murrays at Dornoch after which several of them were beheaded. The Earl of Caithness later imprisoned his son, the Master of Caithnes, for making peace with the Murrays. The Master of Caithness died at Castle Sinclair Girnigoe in 1576. George, 4th Earl of Caithness also obtained a remission to imprison his younger brother David Sinclair in Castle Sinclair Girnigoe.

George Sinclair, 4th Earl of Caithness died at Edinburgh on 9 September 1582 and was buried in Rosslyn Chapel. The grave lies at the west end of the north aisle.

At his own request, his heart was extracted and encased in a leaden casket that was sent to Caithness and deposited at the church in Wick. On Barrogill Castle (Castle of Mey) there is an ancient carving of the arms of George Sincalir, 4th Earl of Caithness.

== Family ==
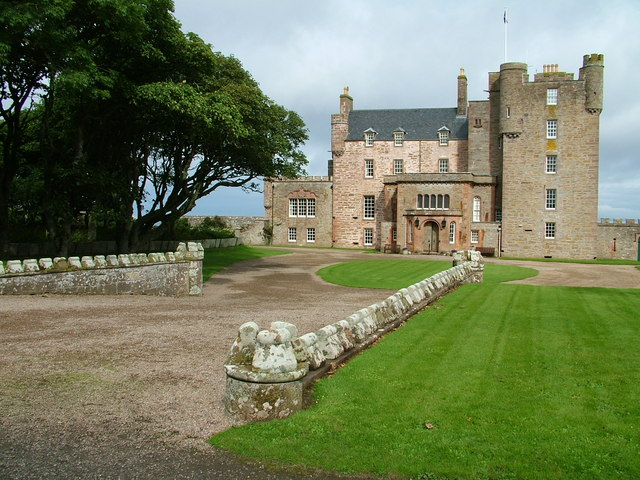
Barrogill Castle (Castle of Mey) where there is an ancient carving of the arms of George Sincalir, 4th Earl of Caithness.

George Sinclair, 4th Earl of Caithness married Lady Elizabeth Graham, daughter of William Graham, 2nd Earl of Montrose, and had the following children:

1. John Sinclair, Master of Caithness (d.1576), who married Jean, daughter of Patrick Hepburn, 3rd Earl of Bothwell, and left children, including George Sinclair, 5th Earl of Caithness.
2. William Sinclair, first laird of Mey and ancestor of the Sinclairs of Ulbster. His son William was at High School in Edinburgh in 1595 and shot John MacMorran.
3. George Sinclair of Mey, Chancellor of Caithness.
4. David Sinclair.
5. Barbara Sinclair or Beatrix Sinclair, who married Alexander Gordon, 12th Earl of Sutherland and divorced him by 1573.
6. Elizabeth Sinclair, who married firstly, Alexander Sutherland, son of Alexander Sutherland, 8th of Duffus, and secondly, Huistean Du Mackay, 13th of Strathnaver.
7. Margaret Sinclair, who married William Sutherland, 9th of Duffus.
8. Barbara Sinclair, married to Alexander Innes of Innes.
9. Janet Sinclair, second or third wife of Robert Munro, 16th Baron of Foulis, but who died childless. In 1582 she received a Tack of the Parsonage of Spittal.
10. Agnes Sinclair, who married as the second wife of Andrew Hay, 8th Earl of Erroll.
- General Arthur St. Clair of the American Revolutionary War was reportedly descended from George Sinclair, 4th Earl of Caithness.

== See also ==
- Barony of Roslin
- Lord Sinclair
- Lord Herdmanston

Peerage of Scotland
Preceded by John Sinclair	Earl of Caithness; 1529–1582	Succeeded by George Sinclair
