= Clan Dunbar =

Lowland Scottish clan

- Dunbarra
- Motto: In Promptu ( In readiness)

Profile
- Region: Lowlands
- District: Dumfries and Galloway

Chief
- Sir James Michael Dunbar
- 14th Baronet of Mochrum and 39th Hereditary Chief of the Name and Arms of Dunbar
- Seat: Mochrum Castle
- Historic seat: Dunbar Castle
Clan branches
Dunbars of Mochrum (current chiefs)
Dunbar Earls of Dunbar (historic chiefs)
Dunbars of Northfield
Dunbars of Hempriggs
Dunbars of Durn
Dunbars of Both
Rival clans
Clan Cameron
Clan Innes

Clan Dunbar is a Scottish clan of the Scottish Lowlands.

== History ==
=== Origins of the Clan ===
The chiefs of Clan Dunbar are of ancient Celtic origin. The town and port of Dunbar have featured prominently in Scottish history on various occasions.

Gospatric, Earl of Northumbria received from Malcolm III of Scotland, the lands of Dunbar as well as other parts of Lothian. In 1128 Gospatric's son, Gospatric II, Earl of Lothian, witnessed the foundation of Holyrood Abbey. He also accorded the rank of earl and made donations to Kelso Abbey.

In around 1184 Patrick of Dunbar married Ada, daughter of William the Lion and was created justiciar of Lothian. Patrick, Earl of Dunbar's daughter received the lands of Home as part of her dowry. This established the line which later became the Earls of Home in the 17th century. The Earl of Dunbar's son, Patrick, went to the Crusades and died at the Siege of Damietta in 1248.

=== Wars of Scottish Independence ===
One of the competitors for the Scottish Crown in 1291 was Patrick Black Beard, Earl of Dunbar who claimed it through his royal grandmother, Ada. Patrick's wife was a Comyn who held Dunbar Castle for John Balliol, although she was forced to surrender it in April 1296. Patrick, Earl of Dunbar sheltered Edward II of England after his escape from the Battle of Bannockburn in 1314. Historians have said that if Dunbar had seized Edward then Edward may have been forced to make peace with Robert the Bruce, preventing further bloodshed. However despite Dunbar's apparent treachery he made peace with his cousin, King Robert, and was present at the Parliament at Ayr in 1315.

Dunbar was later appointed governor of Berwick where he was besieged by Edward III of England. Dunbar surrendered to the English but renounced any allegiance to the English king and as a result his castle was besieged by the Earl of Salisbury. The castle was under the command of Dunbar's wife, Black Agnes. The English attacked the castle with all the siege craft technology of the fourteenth-century including a machine called a "Sow". However, Black Agnes personally directed the machine's destruction by rocks being hurled from the castle walls. The siege lasted nineteen weeks and the Earl of Salisbury retired leaving Agnes in possession of her husband's fortress. When the English fled for their lives, Agnes is said to have scoffed, behold the litter of the English pigs.

The tenth Earl of Dunbar had vast estates and was one of the most powerful nobles in Scotland. He fought at the Battle of Otterburn in 1388. The Earl arranged for his daughter to marry a son of Robert III of Scotland however due to the influence of the Clan Douglas the marriage did not take place.

=== 15th century ===
George, 11th Earl of Dunbar succeeded to his father's vast estates in 1420. He was prominent in public affairs but his wealth became his undoing. James I of Scotland coveted the Dunbar estates and imprisoned the earl on charges of treason with the estates being forfeited to the Crown. He was the last Earl of Dunbar.

=== 16th century ===
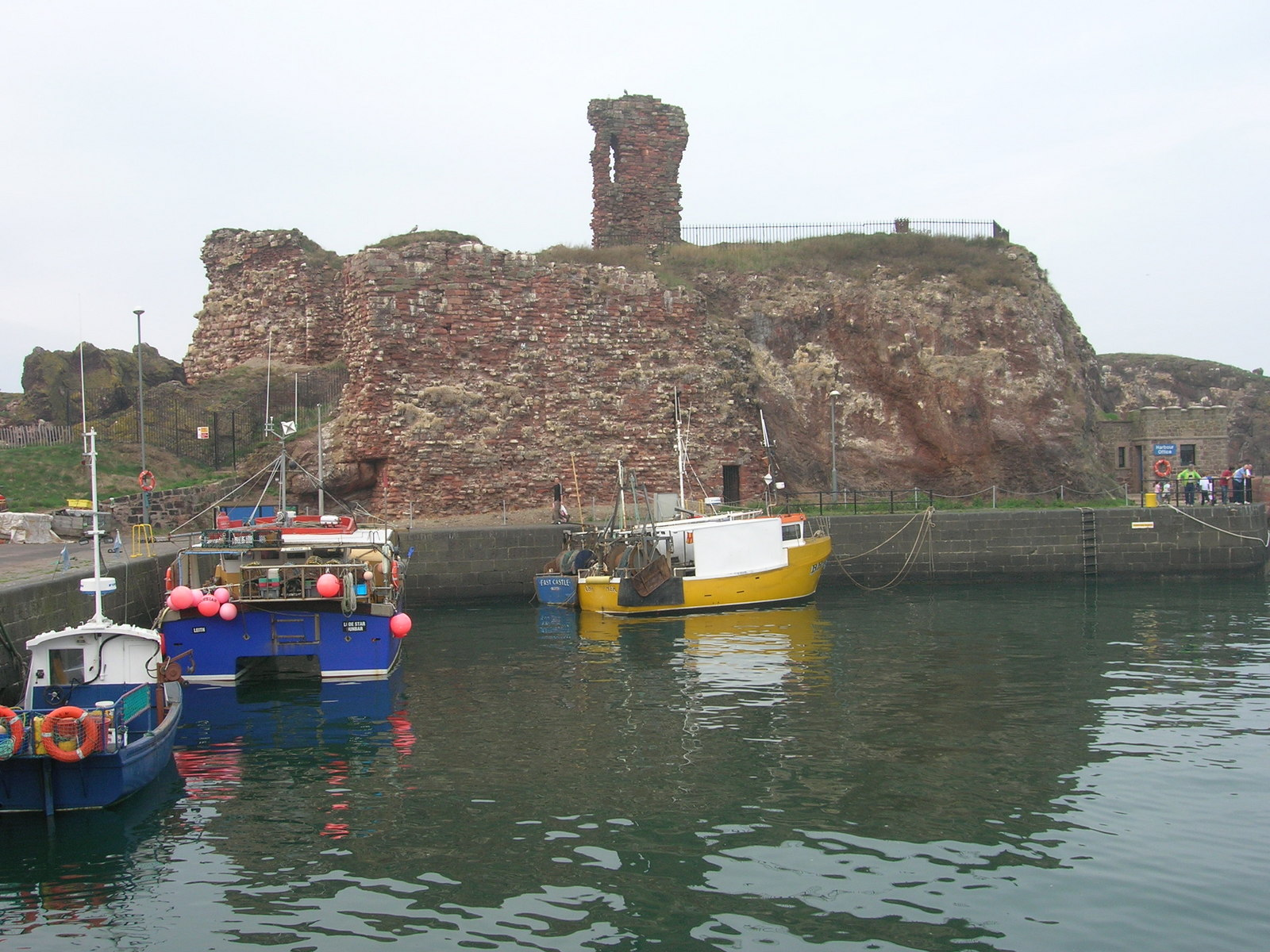
The ruins of Dunbar Castle, the original seat of the chiefs of Clan Dunbar.

There were several other branches of the Clan Dunbar including the Dunbars of Mochrum (current chiefs), Dunbars of Northfield, Dunbars of Hempriggs, Dunbars of Durn and the Dunbars of Both. The representative of each branch achieved the rank of baronet.

During the reign of James V of Scotland, Gavin Dunbar (archbishop of Glasgow), who was a younger son of Sir John Dunbar of Mochrum, distinguished himself at the University of Glasgow and became Dean of Moray in 1514. He was appointed Archbishop of Glasgow in 1524. However he was criticised for his participation in the persecution of Protestants which was instigated by Cardinal Beaton.

In 1513 Sir John Dunbar of Mochrum, Wigtownshire was killed at the Battle of Flodden.

In 1598 the lands of George Dunbar of Moyness were raided by the Clan Cameron. The men listed as being involved in this raid include a good number of Camerons and those from the various tribes of Clan Cameron. Among the so-named "perpetrators" was Allan Cameron, XVI Captain and Chief of Clan Cameron and twenty six other Camerons of noteworthy families. They burnt a handful of homes and took away three score and ten horses, among numerous other personal possessions.

=== 17th and 18th centuries ===
In 1694 Sir James Dunbar of Mochrum was created a Baronet of Nova Scotia. The second baronet served in the cavalry of the Duke of Marlborough with great distinction. He was recognised as clan chief upon the death of Ludovic Dunbar in 1744.

== Clan chief ==
Sir Jean Ivor Dunbar was the 13th Baronet of Mochrum and the Chief of the Name and Arms of Dunbar. After his death in 1993 the title passed to his son, Sir James Michael Dunbar, 14th Baronet of Mochrum and 39th Hereditary Chief of the Name and Arms of Dunbar. He is a retired Colonel of the United States Air Force. In 1990 the chiefship was only established after a celebrated court case that was first heard before the Lord Lyon King of Arms, the Supreme Court in Edinburgh, and then finally in the House of Lords where it was concluded.

== Castles ==
- Mochrum Castle is the seat of the current chiefs of Clan Dunbar, the Dunbars of Mochrum.
- Dunbar Castle was the original seat of the chiefs of Clan Dunbar, the Earls of Dunbar.

== See also ==
- Scottish clan
- Earl of Dunbar
- Dunbar, West Virginia
