= Kinminity =

Scottish former village

Coordinates: 57.05840°N 2.72418°W

- Interactive map of the Kinminity area

General information
- Location: Kinminity, Aberdeenshire, Scotland

Kinminity (Note: Kinminity was formally spelt Kinminitie) is a former village located south-east of Birse, Aberdeenshire in Scotland.

== History ==
The property was in hands of the cadet family of Sutherlands of Kinminitie, from the Sutherland of Duffus family in the 16th century. The manor house was in ruins by the 18th century. Kinminity Farm is located nearby.
