= Lord Duffus =

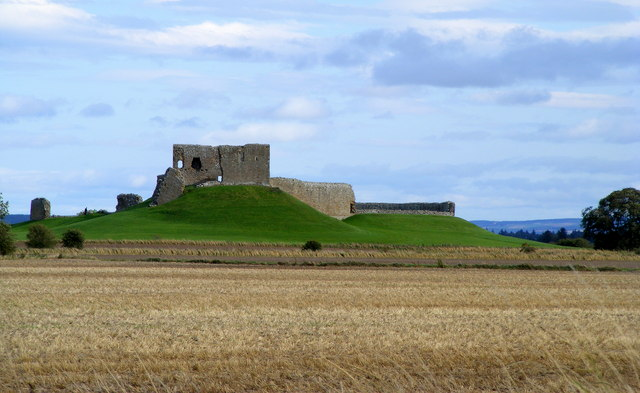
Duffus Castle where the Sutherland of Duffus family were seated from 1350 to 1705.

The title Lord Duffus was created by Charles II in the Peerage of Scotland on 8 December 1650 for Alexander Sutherland. He was a descendant of the 4th Earl of Sutherland, who fell in battle in 1333. The title is now extinct, although there may be male-line Sutherlands descended from earlier lairds of Duffus.

In 1734, the 3rd Lord was attainted and the lordship was forfeited. His son Eric tried but failed to get a reverse of the attainder. His son James Sutherland of Duffus got the attainder reversed, and was restored to the lordship as 4th (titular 5th) Lord Duffus on 25 May 1826. The last two Lords Duffus were also baronets, of Hempriggs in the County of Caithness (3rd and 4th). The lordship became extinct on the death of the 6th (titular 7th) Lord Duffus on 28 August 1875.

== Lairds of Duffus ==
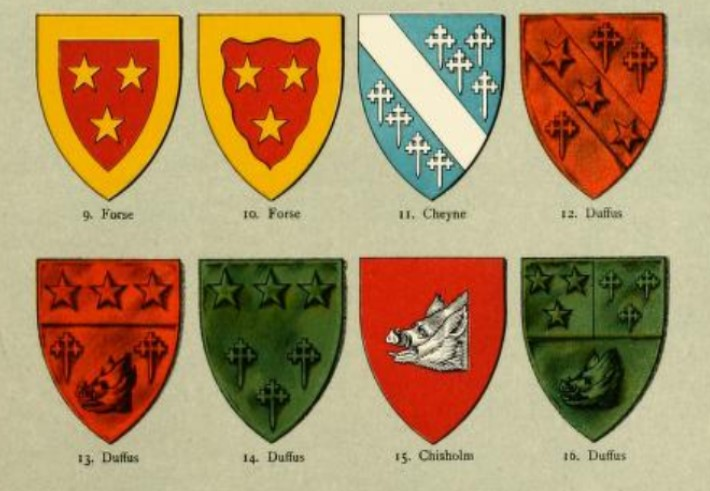
Coats of arms of the Sutherland families of Forse and Duffus, showing the progression of the Duffus coat of arms as they married into the Cheyne and Chisholm families. Nicholas Sutherland, 1st of Duffus married a daughter of Reginald le Chen (d.1345) and Alexander Sutherland, 3rd of Duffus married a daughter of John Chisholm of Chisholm in 1433

The Sutherland family of Duffus descended from Nicholas Sutherland, only brother of William de Moravia, 5th Earl of Sutherland (d. 1370), and younger son of Kenneth de Moravia, 4th Earl of Sutherland. The village of Duffus is outside of the county of Sutherland, but the Sutherlands of Duffus also held lands within Sutherland, most notably Skelbo. Some of the Sutherland of Duffus family may have assumed the surname Duffus, which was the family title instead of the surname Sutherland.

=== List of Lairds of Duffus ===
These are the early ancestors of the Lords Duffus.

- Nicholas Sutherland, 1st of Duffus (younger son of Kenneth de Moravia, 4th Earl of Sutherland (Kenneth Sutherland).
- John Sutherland, 2nd of Duffus.
- Alexander Sutherland, 3rd of Duffus and Torboll (d. c.1484) (son of Henry Sutherland of Torboll, younger son of Nicholas, 1st of Duffus)
- William Sutherland of Quarrywood, later 4th of Duffus (d. c.1513) (son of William Sutherland of Berriedale, son of Alexander, 3rd of Duffus)
- William Sutherland, 5th of Duffus (d. c.1529)
- William Sutherland, 6th of Duffus (d. c.1530)
- William Sutherland, 7th of Duffus (d. 1543)
- Alexander Sutherland, 8th of Duffus (1534 - 1579)
- William Sutherland, 9th of Duffus (d. 1616)
- William Sutherland, 10th of Duffus (d. 1626)

== Lords Duffus (1650–1875) ==
James Sutherland Restoration Act 1826
- Act of Parliament
- Parliament of the United Kingdom
- Long title: An Act for the Restoration of James Sutherland Esquire to the Dignity and Title of Baron Duffus.
- Citation: 7 Geo. 4. c. 51 Pr.

Dates
- Royal assent: 26 May 1826

- Alexander Sutherland, 1st Lord Duffus (d. 1674) (son of William Sutherland, 10th of Duffus)
- James Sutherland, 2nd Lord Duffus (d. 1705) who had issue four sons including Kenneth Sutherland, 3rd Lord Duffus, Sir James Dunbar, 1st Baronet of Hempriggs (who changed his surname from Sutherland to Dunbar), two others, and one daughter.
- Kenneth Sutherland, 3rd Lord Duffus (d. 1734). His estates were forfeited for taking part in the Jacobite rising of 1715. He fled to Sweden, where he married a Swedish lady, Christina Sjöblad, by whom he had:
- Eric Sutherland, 4th Lord Duffus (1710-1768) (not restored, but counted), he married his first cousin Elizabeth, third daughter of Sir James Dunbar, 1st Baronet of Hempriggs who was originally James Sutherland the second son of James Sutherland, 2nd Lord Duffus.
- James Sutherland, 5th Lord Duffus (1747-1827). His title was restored by an act of Parliament, the James Sutherland Restoration Act 1826 (7 Geo. 4. c. 51 Pr.). He was succeeded by his 2nd cousin in the male line:
- Benjamin Sutherland Dunbar, 6th Lord Duffus, 3rd Baronet of Hempriggs (1761-1843), the surname Sutherland having previously been changed to Dunbar.
- George Sutherland Dunbar, 7th Lord Duffus (1799-1875) (extinct 1875) used the title of 7th Lord Duffus, but was also known as Sir George Dunbar of Hempriggs, 4th Baronet. One source, "Lost Lordship of Duffus", claims that due to the Rudd challenge, the 7th Lord never used the title, and chose to be known as a baronet.

== See also ==
- Earl of Sutherland
- Dunbar baronets

== Notes ==
Information on the Lords Duffus was obtained in part from the Sutherland history (below), and from Elinor Glyn (1955), a memoir by her grandson Anthony Glyn. Glyn and her sister Lucy, Lady Duff-Gordon were born Sutherlands, descended from David Sutherland, Laird of Cambusavie, allegedly a son of Alexander Sutherland, a younger brother of the Jacobite 3rd Lord Duffus, who is described in The Scots Peerage as having died without issue. The fact that the 6th Lord Duffus inherited in 1827 over the now Canadian Sutherlands, who sold their estates in the 1770s to the Earl of Sutherland, probably means that the relationship was more distant, or if the same, that the Laird of Cambusavie was illegitimate.
