= Kinsteary House =

Scottish manor house

- Kinsteary, Highland, Scotland

Location
- Coordinates: 57°33′58″N 3°47′47″W

Kinsteary House (Note: Kinsteary was formally spelt Kinstearie or Kingsterrie) is a manor house and site of a possible castle located south of Auldearn, Highland in Scotland.

== History ==
The property passed by marriage of Muriel, daughter of John Chisholm and Catherine Bisset, to Alexander Sutherland, 3rd of Duffus in the 15th century. It was later held by the Sutherland cadet family of Kinstearie, by James Sutherland, third son of Alexander Sutherland, 8th of Duffus.
