= Evelix =

Coordinates: 57.88957°N 4.08209°W

Evelix: Scottish Gaelic: Èibhleag
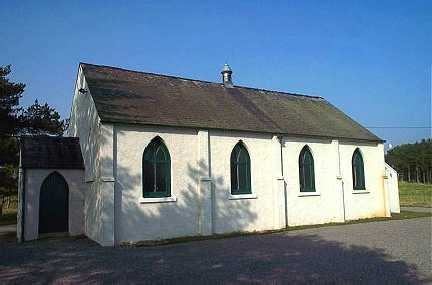
- Free Presbyterian Church of Scotland at Evelix

- Location within the Sutherland area
- OS grid reference: NH766908
- Council area: Highland
- Lieutenancy area: Sutherland
- Country: Scotland
- Sovereign state: United Kingdom
- Postcode district: IV25 3
- Police: Scotland
- Fire: Scottish
- Ambulance: Scottish

Evelix or Evelick (Scottish Gaelic: Èibhleag) is a village near Dornoch in south east Sutherland, Scotland. The River Evelix runs through it. Evelix is in the Scottish council area of Highland.

There is a petrol station with Tall Pines restaurant in Evelix, on A9. Households are scattered around and do not form a perceivable village.
