= Quarrelwood Castle =

Former Scottish castle

- Quarrelwood, Moray, Scotland

Site information
- Type: Castle

Location
- Coordinates: 57.6602110°N 3.3746061°W

Site history
- Built: 14th century

Quarrelwood Castle was a medieval castle located about 2.5 miles (4.0 km) north-west of Elgin, in the parish of Spynie, Moray, Scotland (OS grid reference NJ 1808 6420).

== History ==
Blazon_Clan_Chisholm

The castle was built in the 14th century by Robert Lauder of the Bass, Justiciar of Scotia. It passed by marriage of Robert's daughter Ann to Robert Chisholm. The castle later passed through the marriage of Muriel, daughter of John Chisholm and Catherine Bisset, to Alexander Sutherland, 3rd of Duffus in the 15th century. It was briefly held by William Duff of Dipple before passing by the marriage of his daughter to William Sutherland of Roscommon.

Quarrelwood was occupied until the mid 18th century, afterwards becoming ruinous and was dismantled and used for building materials in the area.
