= Brightmony House =

Scottish manor house

- Interactive map of the Brightmony House area

General information
- Location: Brightmony, Highland, Scotland
- Coordinates: 57°33′40″N 3°47′27″W

Brightmony House (Note: Brightmony was formally spelt Brichtmonie, Brichtmony or known as Birchmond) is an 18th-century manor house located south of Auldearn, Highland in Scotland. It is a Category A listed building

== History ==
The property was in the Sutherland of Duffus family in the 15th century. The 18th century house was built by Alexander Brodie of Lethen in 1732.
