= Proncy Castle =

Former Scottish castle

- Proncy, Highland, Scotland
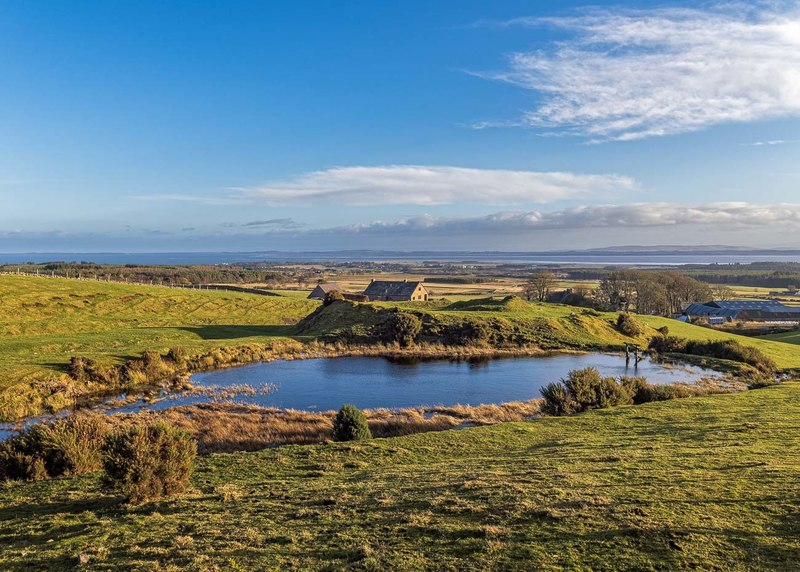
- Ruins of Proncy Castle in 2020

Location
- Proncy Castle
- Coordinates: 57.905685°N 4.075141°W

Proncy Castle is a ruined castle located near Dornoch, Highland, Scotland. It is within the historic county of Sutherland. The castle is positioned to command open views to the south over the Dornoch Firth.

== History ==
Hugh de Moravia granted Proncy in 1211 to Gilbert de Moravia the Bishop of Caithness. A motte and bailey castle was constructed in the early 13th century. A stone tower was later constructed on the motte. Held by Elizabeth Sutherland, 10th Countess of Sutherland and her husband Adam Gordon, it was granted to William Sutherland, 5th of Duffus in 1524. It was later held by the Gordon of Proncy family.
