= Clan Innes =

Scottish clan

- Crest: A boar's head erased Proper.
- Motto: Be Traist (be faithful.)

Profile
- Region: Lowlands
- District: Moray
- Plant badge: Great Bulrush
- Clan Innes no longer has a chief, and is an armigerous clan
- Historic seat: Innes House (1640–1767)
- Last Chief: Sir James Innes, 6th Baronet
- Died: 19 July 1823
Septs of Clan Innes
Ennes, MacTary, Milnes, Marnoch, Mitchell, Ennis, Maver, Oynie, Ince, Mavor, MacRob, Redford, Inch, Middleton, Innis, Mill, Wilson, Milne, Yunie
Clan branches
Innes of Ardtannes
Innes of Auchmore, Innes of Balvenie, Innes of Benwall, Innes of Blackhills, Innes of Blairton, Innes of Calrossie, Innes of Cathlaw, Innes of Corries, Innes of Cowie, Innes of Coxton, Innes of Cupar, Innes of Draini, Innes of Duncanstone, Innes of Edingight, Innes of Ennore, Innes of Finchley Manor, Innes of Fodderletter, Innes of Gartaneaglais, Innes of Giffordvale, Innes of Inchstellie, Innes of Innermarkie, Innes of Innes, Innes of Insch, Innes of Inverbreakie, Innes of Kikrton, Innes of Knockenbeg, Innes of Learney, Innes of Leichars, Innes of Mathiemill, Innes of Muiryfold, Innes of Pethnnick, Innes of Rathven, Innes of Rosskeen, Innes of Stow, Innes of Thursater, Innes of Tinriach,
Innes of Toux.
Rival clans
Clan Dunbar

Clan Innes is a Lowland Scottish clan. The clan takes its name from the lands of Innes in Moray, Scotland. The de facto chief of the clan is the Duke of Roxburghe, directly descended in the male line from the Innes baronets, chiefs of the name.

== Origin ==
On Christmas Day 1160, a charter encompassing parts of Elgin, Innes, and Urquhart in the Province of Moray was granted by King Malcolm IV of Scotland to one Berowaldo Flandrensi and his heirs hereditarily. Whilst the reason for the granting of this charter is unknown, it is possible that it was in return for military service, as the north-eastern county of Moray was a troublesome region, with earlier settlers described as Flemish being granted lands in the wake of the Davidian Revolution. Whilst some historians have argued for a Gaelic origin for Berowald, the name itself is probably Germanic, with others suggesting a connection with the Holland-based Counts of Egmond.

== Early History ==
In 1226, Walter, son of John, and grandson of Berowald the Fleming was granted a charter of confirmation by Alexander II of Scotland which included the lands of Innes and Urquhart in return for Knightly service at the castle of Elgin. In 1291, a Willelmus de Inays appeared in the Ragman Rolls signing allegiance in Aberdeen to Edward I who had notably stayed at Elgin Castle some years later, though the position that the family took in the ensuing Wars of Scottish Independence is unknown. In the 14th century, the ninth laird Alexander married Janet of Aberchirder from whom the lands of Aberchirder were absorbed into the Innes estates, Alexander’s son and tenth laird of Innes, Sir Walter became the thane of Aberchirder upon the death of his mother. In 1452, Robert Innes, the eleventh laird fought under the The Earl of Huntly with his kinsmen at the Battle of Brechin, later funding the new buildings of the Greyfriars in Elgin in an attempt to repay for his sins.

In the 16th century the family engaged in a violent feud with the neighbouring Clan Dunbar which culminated in an event known as the ‘Bloody Vespers’, when a gang of Inneses attacked Elgin Cathedral intent on slaying the Prior of Pluscarden, a Dunbar, on the first of January 1555. In 1577, Alexander the sixteenth laird was charged and executed for murder, with his brother, John abdicating the lairdship to his cousin, Alexander of Innes, the 3rd laird of Crommey. As a result of the passing of the lairdship to the Crommey branch of Innesses, a feud arose between the laird of Innes and the laird of Innermarkie, with the Innermarkie’s believing themselves the rightful inheritors of the title and associated lands. This inter-family feud culminated in the murder of Alexander of Innes in Aberdeen in an attack that targeted both him and his son, Robert, who managed to escape and became the nineteenth laird.

== Modern History ==
Robert Innes, the 20th laird of Innes, was a stout covenanter and a Member of Parliament in the north-east during the Wars of the Three Kingdoms who notably rode in the Trot of Turriff. During his tenure as laird, the family held disputes with a faction of Hays and Douglasses which seemed to die out sometime after 1618. The 20th Chief was also made a baronet of Nova Scotia in 1625. The 17th and 18th centuries were a period of turmoil in the north-east, and the various branches of the wider Innes family were involved on all sides of the ensuing conflicts. The lands of Innes were targeted by the Jacobite Army in the Jacobite rising of 1745 and the laird of Innes outwardly declared his support for The Duke of Cumberland, whilst other cadet branches and individuals appeared to support the Jacobite cause.

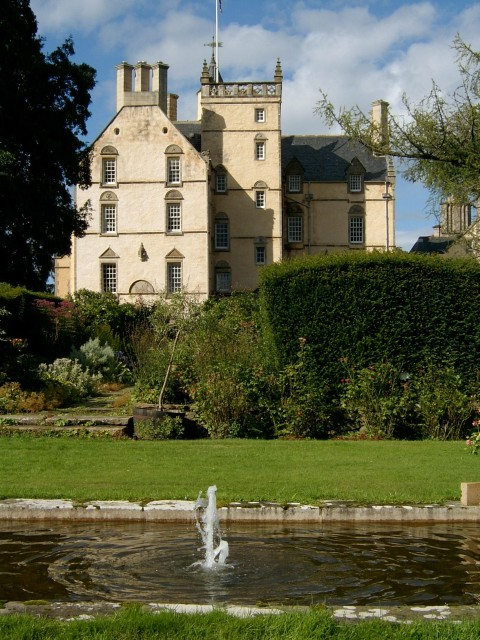
Innes House

Between 1640 and 1653, the construction of the modern Innes House occurred on the site of a former tower house known as "Innes Castle". It remained the seat of the lairds of Innes until 1767 when James Innes-Ker, 6th baronet, sold the lands to James Duff, 2nd Earl Fife. In 1806, the sixth baronet claimed the Dukedom of Roxburghe when the previous duke died without a direct heir as a result of a marriage between his great-grandfather, Sir James Innes, 3rd Baronet, and Lady Margaret Ker. Later in 1812, the House of Lords ruled in favour of Sir James, rejecting claims by the heir-female of the second earl and the heir-male whatsoever of the first earl. Because of the ruling Sir James took the surname Innes-Ker and was titled James Innes-Ker, 5th Duke of Roxburghe. The present duke of Roxburghe is heir to the Chiefship of the clan, however since he bears the surname Innes-Ker the Lord Lyon King of Arms will not recognise him as Chief of the name Innes.

== Clan Chiefs ==
- 1st Berowald Flandrensis 1120-1180, father of
- 2nd John Innes 1150-1225 father of
- 3rd Walter Innes 1180-1240, father of
- 4th Alexander Innes 1200-1260, father of
- 5th William Innes 1240-1290, father of
- 6th William Innes 1270-1320, father of
- 7th William Innes 1300-1372, father of
- 8th Robert Innes 1353-1381, father of
- 9th Alexander Innes 1367-1412, father of
- 10th Walter Innes 1383-1456, father of
- 11th Robert Innes Bef 1427-1464, father of
- 12th James Innes 1440-1491, father of
- 13th Alexander Innes 1465-1537, father of
- 14th Alexander Innes 1503-1553, father of
- 15th William Innes 1522-1565, father of
- 16th Alexander Innes (no issue) 1553-1577, brother of
- 17th John Innes (no issue) 1556-1587, cousin of
- 18th Alexander Innes 1537-1580, father of
- 19th Robert Innes 1562-1596, father of
- 20th Robert Innes 1584-1658, father of
- 21st Robert Innes 1619-1689, father of
- 22nd James Innes -1694, father of
- 23rd Henry Innes -5 Nov 1721, father of
- 24th Henry Innes -31 Oct 1762, father of
- 25th James Innes-Kerr né Innes 1736-1823, Duke of Roxburgh

Chiefdom lapsed due to non-recognition by Lord Lyon.

== Heraldry ==
The oldest coat of arms associated with an Innes is styled as three mullets azure, on an argent background which is typical of later Innes coats of arms. At some point, the Innesses of Innes took the boar's head as a heraldic crest alongside the motto of ‘Be Traist’ (Scots for “be true”, “be faithful”) which is now used in the form of a “clan crest” by people that wish to express their Innes ancestry. These historic arms have been incorporated into the current arms of the Duke of Roxburghe alongside those associated with the Ker family that initially held the title.

== Tartans and Symbols ==
As the Innes family is predominantly found within the lowlands of the north-east of Scotland, the associated tartans are a later invention that represent a contemporary and non-historical idea of clanship. However, since the 1850s there have been multiple tartans associated with the family, the oldest of which being the “Innes (miniature)” tartan which is based on an older depiction of Georgina Innes of Edingight and is dated to 1850. According to the official Scottish Register of Tartans, there are nine different tartans associated with various branches and individuals belonging to the Innes family.

The plant badge associated with the family is that of the Great Bulrush, though the historicity of this symbol is also debatable. It is possibly related to the fact that the original lands of Innes were historically a wetland, with the Great Bulrush being associated with wetland and riverine environments.

== Recognition as a Clan ==
Whether or not lowland families can be considered a clan is an item up for debate, with some arguing that families found predominantly in the lowlands such as and including the Inneses are not clans. The Innes family does not appear in any historical list of clans, however a 16th century act does refer to the “clannis and surnames of the Dumbarris and Innessis” in relation to the ongoing feud.

== Cadet Branches & Septs ==
Whilst many surnames are listed by non-official organizations and certain works such as the Clan Innes society as ‘septs’, the wider House of Innes is an amalgamation of interrelated cadet branches descending from a common progenitor. These “septs” represent associated surnames or different spellings of the surname that do not inherently denote genealogical relation, whereas the list of cadet branches represents notable branches of the family that share a common ancestry.

In the 1980s, the Clan Innes society was formed in America to collect and conduct research on the history of the family of Innes.
