= Torboll =

Locality in Highland (council area), Scotland

Coordinates: 57.9629939°N 4.1098034°W

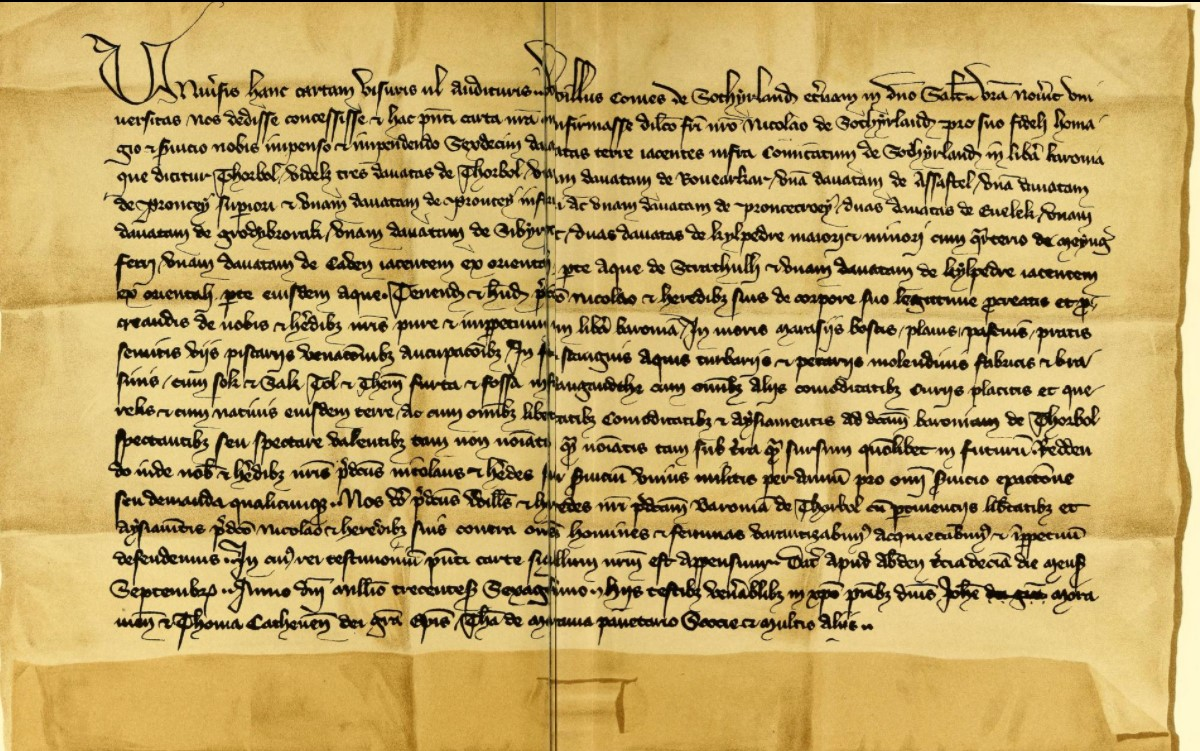
The charter establishing the barony in 1360

Torboll is a former feudal barony and geographical area that includes Torboll Farm, Little Torboll, Torboll Fall, and the Torboll Woods Site of Special Scientific Interest, in the parish of Golspie, Highland, Scotland. It is within the historic county of Sutherland.

== Geography ==
The Torboll Woods Site of Special Scientific Interest and Torboll Fall with a 19th-century fish ladder allowing salmon to bypass the 60 ft waterfall and swim upstream to Loch Buidh, are located nearby.

== History ==
The name derives from the Norse for "Thor's Field".

The lands and barony of Torboll, were granted by Kenneth de Moravia, 4th Earl of Sutherland, to his younger son Nicholas Sutherland.
