= Clan Cheyne =

Scottish clan

- Motto: Patientia Vincit (Patience conquers)

Profile
- District: Aberdeenshire, Caithness and Sutherland
- Clan Cheyne no longer has a chief, and is an armigerous clan
- Historic seat: Esslemont Castle, Aberdeenshire
Clan branches
Cheyne of Straloch
Cheyne of Dundarg
Cheyne of Pitfitchie
Allied clans
Clan Sutherland
Rival clans
Clan Hay

Clan Cheyne is a Scottish clan. The clan is officially recognized by the Lord Lyon King of Arms; however, as the clan does not currently have a chief recognized by the Court of the Lord Lyon, it is therefore considered an armigerous clan. The surname Cheyne is also recognized as a sept of the Clan Sutherland, and is accepted as such by the Clan Sutherland Society in Scotland.

Arms of Cheyne of Straloch

Arms of Cheyne of Innerugie

Arms of Cheyne of Esselmont

== History ==
=== Origins of the name ===
According to the Collins Scottish Clan & Family Encycleopdia, the surname Cheyne is of great antiquity and is believed to have been of either Norman or French origin. The name apparently means Oak Plantation. According to the historian George Fraser Black, some early clerics confused the word for "oak" (chene) with that of "dog" (chien) and in error they styled the name Canis.

=== Origins of the clan ===
In 1158, Ricardus de Chanai witnessed a gift to the Hospital of St Peter of York. However, the earliest record of the name in Scotland is that of William de Chense, who witnessed a charter by William the Lion in about 1200. From 1267 to 1269 Sir Reginald le Chain was Great Chamberlain of Scotland. He held the lands of Inverugie as well as immense estates in Caithness.

=== Wars of Scottish Independence ===
In 1320, a later Sir Reginald signed the Declaration of Arbroath.

=== 14th-century ===
Historian William Anderson stated that Sir Reginald le Chain who died in 1350 (or 1345) was survived by two daughters. However, as he was renowned as a mighty hunter throughout the land, he longed for a male heir to succeed to his estates, but his wife gave birth to two daughters which Reginald had killed, or at least he thought he had killed. The story goes that as the years passed and no male heir was born, that he saw two young ladies at a festival who far outshined the rest in beauty and accomplishment. He expressed admiration for them to his wife and the cruel fate which had caused to him to order the death of his two daughters, which had they lived would have been about the same age as the two beauties. His wife then introduced him to the two girls, confessing her justifiable disobedience that they were actually his own two daughters. Sir Reginald Cheyne then acknowledged them as heirs to his lands of Esslemont, which had become the principal seat of the family through marriage to the heiress of the Marshall of Esslemont.

Mary or Marjory, one of the two daughters of Reginald Cheyne married Nicholas Sutherland, 1st of Duffus, a branch of the Clan Sutherland, and as such the surname Cheyne is regarded as sept of the Clan Sutherland.

A different source gives the daughters' names as:

- Mary, married Nicholas Sutherland, 1st of Duffus, son of Kenneth de Moravia, Earl of Sutherland and Marjorie of Mar.
- Mariota, married firstly John Douglas, son of John Douglas of Lothian and secondly John Keith, second son of Sir Edward Keith, 11th Marischal of Scotland and Isabella de Synton.

Sir Reginald died in 1345 and the Cheyne lands hence passed mainly to the Sutherlands in Caithness and the Keiths in Aberdeenshire.

=== 16th-century ===
The Cheyne's Esslemont Castle was destroyed in the aftermath of a feud with the Clan Hay.

== Later clansmen ==
Sir William Cheyne (d.1932) was a distinguished surgeon and bacteriologist who was a pioneer of antiseptic surgical methods in Britain.

== Castles ==
Castles that have belonged to the Clan Cheyne have included amongst others:

- Inverugie Castle and Ravenscraig Castle, in Aberdeenshire, were held by the Cheynes from the thirteenth century or earlier.
- Esslemont Castle, Aberdeenshire, was held by the Cheynes until 1625.
- Pitfitchie Castle, Aberdeenshire.
- Ackergill Tower, Caithness, held by the Cheynes until passing to the Clan Keith around 1350.
- Castle of Old Wick, Caithness, held by the Cheynes until passing to the Clan Sutherland around 1350.
- Berriedale Castle, Berriedale, Highland, Caithness, held by the Cheynes but later passed to the Clan Sutherland.
- Straloch Castle, New Machar, Aberdeenshire.

== See also ==
- Scottish clan
- Armigerous clan
- Reginald Cheyne
