= Scheduled monuments in Aberdeenshire =

Aberdeenshire shown within Scotland

A scheduled monument in Scotland is a nationally important archaeological site or monument which is given legal protection by being placed on a list (or "schedule") maintained by Historic Environment Scotland. The aim of scheduling is to preserve the country's most significant sites and monuments as far as possible in the form in which they have been inherited.

The process of scheduling is governed by the Ancient Monuments and Archaeological Areas Act 1979, which aims "to make provision for the investigation, preservation and recording of matters of archaeological or historical interest". The term "scheduled monument" can apply to the whole range of archaeological sites which have been deliberately constructed by human activity but are not always visible above ground. They range from prehistoric standing stones and burial sites, through Roman remains and medieval structures such as castles and monasteries, to later structures such as industrial sites and buildings constructed for the World Wars. Some buildings or structures which were both scheduled and listed have had their listing designations removed to reduce the duplication.

As of 2017 there were 8,239 scheduled monuments in Scotland.

== Notable scheduled monuments in Aberdeenshire ==
Name	Location	Description	Ref No	Image
Old Parish Church of St Talorgan	Fordyce	Ruined church	SM352	
Parkhouse Hill stone circle (Aikey Brae)	Old Deer	Recumbent stone circle	SM2	
Berrybrae stone circle	Crimond, Lonmay	Prehistoric stone circle	SM8	
Cothiemuir Hill	Keig	Prehistoric stone circle	SM17	
Broomend henge, standing stones and symbol stone	Port Elphinstone	Prehistoric henge and avenue	SM18	
Christchurch, stone circle and standing stone, Midmar	Midmar	Recumbent stone circle	SM32	
Old Keig stone circle	Keig	Recument stone circle	SM40	
Sunhoney	Midmar	Recumbent stone circle	SM44	
Whitehill stone circle	Bogmore Wood, Monymusk	Recumbent stone circle	SM55	
Tap o' Noth	Rhynie	Hill Fort	SM63	
Ardlair Stone	Kennethmont	Pictish symbol stone	SM65	
Craw Stane	Rhynie	Class 1 Pictish symbol stone	SM69	
Kintore symbol stone	Kintore	Pictish symbol stone	SM76	
Balquhain Castle	Chapel of Garioch	Remains of a tower house	SM90	
Doune of Invernochty motte	Strathdon	Medieval motte	SM94	
Hill of Dunnideer, fort, platform settlement and tower	Insch	Prehistoric fort	SM95	
Inverallochy Castle	Rathen	Ruinous large courtyard castle	SM97	
Inverugie Castle	Inverugie	16th-century Tower House	SM98	
The Bass and Little Bass	Inverurie	Motte-and-bailey castle and earthworks	SM99	
Boyne Castle	Boyndie	16th-century quadrangular castle	SM354	
Eslie stone circle (ESE of Eslie)	Banchory	Recumbent stone circle	SM976	
Eslie stone circle (South of Eslie)	Banchory	Recumbent stone circle	SM977	
Nine Stanes (Mulloch Wood) stone circle	Banchory	Recumbent stone circle	SM979	
Old Bourtreebush stone circle	Banchory-Devenick	Remains of stone circle	SM980	
Dunnottar Castle	Dunnottar	Ruinous castle	SM986	
Dundarg Castle	New Aberdour	Traces of prehistoric fort/remains of medieval castle	SM2450	
Ravenscraig Castle	Peterhead	Ruined 15th-century L-shaped tower-house	SM2496	
Gight Castle	Fyvie	Ruined 16th-century castle	SM2508	
Findlater Castle	Sandend	Ruined medieval castle	SM2846	
Banff Castle	Banff	Traces of medieval castle	SM2927	
Old Slains Castle	Slains	Ruined medieval tower house	SM3250	
Esslemont Castle	Ellon, Aberdeenshire	Ruined Tower House	SM3400	
Balquhain stone circle	Chapel of Garioch	Recumbent stone circle	SM3961	
Balbridie timber hall	Banchory	Site of a Neolithic long house	SM4084	
Capo long barrow	Fettercairn	Neolithic long burial barrow	SM4444	
Pittulie Castle	Pitsligo	Ruined 16th/17th-century castle	SM5578	
Eden Castle	Near Banff	Ruined 16th/17th-century towerhouse	SM5638	
Conzie Castle (Bognie Castle)	Huntly	Ruined 17th-century house	SM5899	
Fedderate Castle	New Deer	15th-century stronghold	SM5951	
Pitsligo Castle	Pitsligo	15th/18th-century ruined courtyard castle	SM6146	
Old Aberdour Kirk	Aberdour, Aberdeenshire	Ruined St Drostran's kirk and graveyard	SM6155	
Ellon Castle	Ellon	Remains of a late medieval/early modern castle	SM7333	
Cowie Castle	Cowie	Traces of medieval castle	SM9742	
Glenkindie House souterrain	Towie	Prehistoric souterrain (underground store)	SM10953	
Asloun Castle	Alford	Round tower, remains of a larger building	SM11392	
Corgarff Castle	Corgarff	16th-century castle	SM90080	
Cullerlie stone circle	Echt	Prehistoric stone circle	SM90088	
Culsh souterrain	Tarland	Iron Age souterrain (underground storage chamber)	SM90091	
East Aquhorthies stone circle	Inverurie	Prehistoric recumbent stone circle	SM90126	
Glenbuchat Castle	Glenbuchat	Ruined z-plan tower hooooouse	SM90151	
Huntly Castle	Huntly	Remains of L-plan castle	SM90165	
Kildrummy Castle	Kildrummy	Remains of medieval castle	SM90181	
Maiden Stone	Chapel of Garioch	Pictish cross-slab symbol stone	SM90210	
Picardy Stone	Insch	Class I Pictish symbol stone	SM90239	
St John's Church, Gamrie	Gardenstown	Ruined church and burial ground	SM5678	
Tolquhon Castle	Tarves	Ruined 15th/16th-century castle	SM90302	
Tomnaverie stone circle	Coull	Recumbent stone circle	SM90303	

== See also ==
- List of Category A listed buildings in Aberdeenshire
