= Reginald le Chen =

Reginald le Chen may refer to:

- Reginald le Chen (d.1293), Chamberlain of Scotland
- Reginald le Chen (d.1312), Scottish noble
- Reginald le Chen (d.1345), Scottish noble
