= Berriedale Castle =

Historic castle in Caithness, Scotland

- Berriedale, Caithness in Scotland
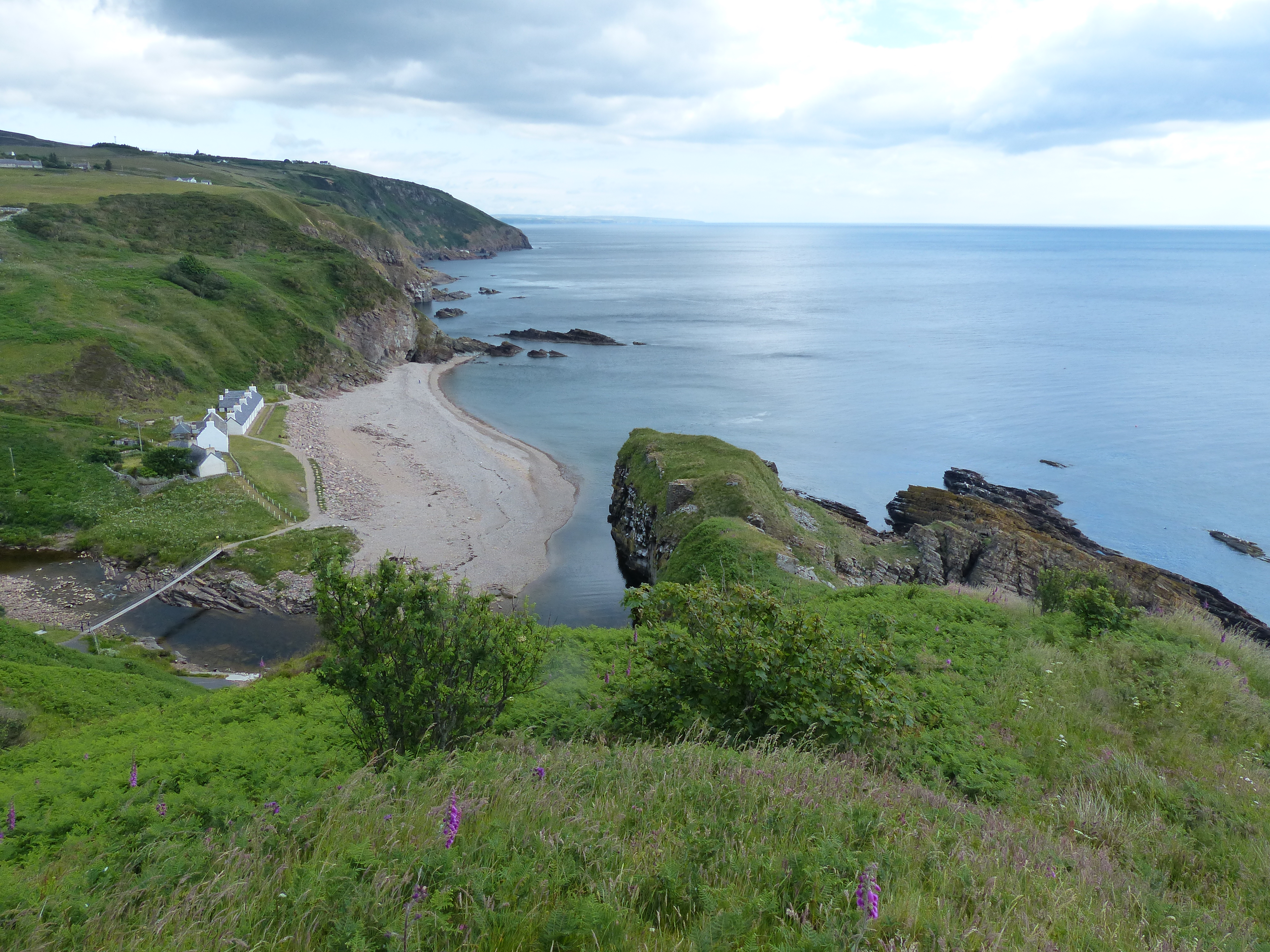
- Ruins of Berriedale Castle on the promontory.

Site information
- Open to the public: Yes
- Condition: Ruined

Location
- Coordinates: 58.1820°N 3.4962°W

Scheduled monument
- Official name: Berriedale Castle
- Type: Secular castle
- Designated: 15 August 1974
- Reference no.: SM3438

Berriedale Castle is a historic ruined castle located on a promontory on the south of the entrance to Berriedale Water, a river in Caithness in Scotland. It is surrounded by sea cliffs and the landward approach was separated by a large ditch.

== History ==
The castle was known to be held by Reginald le Chen of Inverugie and Duffus, in the early 14th century. It passed by marriage of his daughter Mary to Nicholas Sutherland. The castle later passed by the marriage of Christian, the daughter and heiress of Alexander Sutherland, Master of Duffus, to William Oliphant in the 15th century. Andrew Oliphant sold the property to his uncle, Laurence, Lord Oliphant in 1526. The Sutherlands of Duffus attacked and captured the castle in 1566, before handing the castle back to the Oliphants. The castle was sold in 1606 to the Earl of Caithness.
