= Donald Mackay, 5th of Strathnaver =

Scottish clan chief (d. 1370)

Donald Mackay, 5th of Strathnaver (died 1370), was the fifth chief of the ancient Clan Mackay, a Scottish clan of the Scottish Highlands.

== Early life ==
Donald Mackay was the eldest son of Iye Mackay, 4th of Strathnaver. In 1370, he and his father were together murdered at Dingwall Castle, Ross-shire, by Nicholas Sutherland, 1st of Duffus, brother of William, 5th Earl of Sutherland during a feud with the Clan Sutherland. (See page: Iye Mackay, 4th of Strathnaver for a full account of the details).

== Family ==
Donald Mackay, 5th of Strathnaver, left the following children:

1. Angus Mackay, 6th of Strathnaver, who succeeded his grandfather, Iye Mackay, 4th of Strathnaver.
2. Huistean Du Mackay, who became the tutor to his nephew, Angus Du Mackay, 7th of Strathnaver, son of his elder brother Angus, during his nephew's minority.
3. Martin Mackay, who settled in Galloway according to Sir Robert Gordon, 1st Baronet, but of whom nothing else is known.
4. Neil Mackay, who settled in Creich. His three sons were Thomas Neilson Mackay, Neil Neilson Mackay and Morgan Neilson Mackay. Thomas was executed in Inverness in 1426, probably for the murder of Mowat of Bucholly. Neil and Morgan both married daughters of Murray of Aberscross and in the service of Murray and the Earl of Sutherland, they attacked their cousin, chief Angus Du Mackay, 7th of Strathnaver in an attempt to take over his lands of Strathnaver, but were defeated and killed at the Battle of Drumnacoub by the Clan Mackay who were led by Angus Du Mackay's second son John Mackay, I of Aberach. The sons of Neil Neilson Mackay were: John Bain who settled in Caithness and was the ancestor of numerous Bain families, Angus who was ancestor of the Siol-Angus and Paul who was ancestor of the Polsons and some MacPhails. As such the names Bain, Neilson, Paul and Polson are all septs of the Clan Mackay.

== See also ==
- Clan Mackay
- Chiefs of Clan Mackay
- Clan Sutherland
- Earl of Sutherland
