= List of listed buildings in Aberdour, Aberdeenshire =

This is a list of listed buildings in the parish of Aberdour in Aberdeenshire, Scotland.

== List ==
Name	Location	Date Listed	Grid Ref. (Note: Sometimes known as OSGB36, the grid reference (where provided) is based on the British national grid reference system used by the Ordnance Survey. • "Guide to National Grid". Ordnance Survey. • "Get-a-map". Ordnance Survey.)	Geo-coordinates	Notes	LB Number (Note: Historic Environment Scotland assign a unique alphanumeric identifier to each designated site in Scotland, for listed buildings this always begins with "LB", for example "LB12345".)	Image
28 Pennan				57°40′44″N 2°15′38″W	Category B	2718	Upload Photo
30 Pennan				57°40′44″N 2°15′38″W	Category C(S)	2719	Upload Photo
37 Pennan, Janrew				57°40′44″N 2°15′39″W	Category C(S)	2725	Upload Photo
Old Aberdour, Mill Farmhouse				57°40′06″N 2°11′47″W	Category B	2747	Upload Photo
New Aberdour, (Elphin Street) Aberdour Parish Church (Church Of Scotland) and Burial Ground				57°39′37″N 2°11′41″W	Category B	2772	Upload another image
The Shed (opposite No 36 Pennan)				57°40′44″N 2°15′39″W	Category C(S)	2724	Upload Photo
41, 42 Pennan				57°40′44″N 2°15′41″W	Category C(S)	2727	Upload Photo
2 Pennan				57°40′45″N 2°15′30″W	Category C(S)	2753	Upload Photo
3 Pennan				57°40′45″N 2°15′30″W	Category C(S)	2754	Upload Photo
10 Pennan, The Shed				57°40′44″N 2°15′33″W	Category C(S)	2757	Upload Photo
Pennan, Telephone Kiosk, Opposite Pennan Inn				57°40′44″N 2°15′35″W	Category C(S)	2760	Upload another image See more images
18, 19 Pennan				57°40′44″N 2°15′35″W	Category C(S)	2761	Upload Photo
21 Pennan				57°40′44″N 2°15′36″W	Category C(S)	2763	Upload Photo
33 Pennan				57°40′44″N 2°15′38″W	Category B	2721	Upload Photo
36 Pennan				57°40′44″N 2°15′40″W	Category B	2723	Upload Photo
45, 46, 47 Pennan, Anchor Close				57°40′44″N 2°15′42″W	Category C(S)	2729	Upload Photo
Old Aberdour, Former Church (Church Of Scotland) Manse (Beach House Hotel), Steading And Garden Walls				57°40′08″N 2°11′44″W	Category B	2745	Upload Photo
Pennan Farm, Farmhouse				57°40′35″N 2°14′42″W	Category C(S)	2749	Upload Photo
Pennan Harbour, East and West Piers				57°40′47″N 2°15′31″W	Category B	2750	Upload Photo
14 Pennan				57°40′44″N 2°15′34″W	Category C(S)	2759	Upload Photo
26 Pennan				57°40′44″N 2°15′37″W	Category C(S)	2767	Upload Photo
Nethermill Bridge Over The Tore Burn				57°40′52″N 2°16′19″W	Category C(S)	2771	Upload Photo
New Aberdour, Low Street, Culag and Garden Walls				57°39′18″N 2°11′49″W	Category B	2774	Upload Photo
35 Pennan				57°40′44″N 2°15′39″W	Category B	2722	Upload Photo
48 Pennan				57°40′44″N 2°15′43″W	Category C(S)	2730	Upload Photo
Old Aberdour, Old Church of Scotland (St Drostan's) and Burial Ground				57°40′10″N 2°11′45″W	Now scheduled monument SM6155	2744	Upload another image
22 Pennan				57°40′43″N 2°15′36″W	Category C(S)	2764	Upload Photo
Aberdour House				57°39′55″N 2°09′10″W	Category A	2768	Upload Photo
Dundarg Castle House				57°40′24″N 2°10′41″W	Category B	34	Upload another image
6, 7 Pennan				57°40′44″N 2°15′31″W	Category C(S)	2756	Upload Photo
20 Pennan				57°40′44″N 2°15′36″W	Category B	2762	Upload Photo
24 Pennan				57°40′43″N 2°15′37″W	Category C(S)	2766	Upload Photo
51 Pennan				57°40′44″N 2°15′44″W	Category C(S)	2731	Upload Photo
Aberdour House, Walled Garden				57°39′53″N 2°09′13″W	Category C(S)	2769	Upload Photo
Aberdour House, Dovecot				57°39′38″N 2°09′22″W	Category C(S)	2770	Upload Photo
Glasslaw Bridge over The Burn of Glasslaw (or Gonar Burn)				57°37′24″N 2°14′35″W	Category C(S)	35	Upload Photo
38 Pennan				57°40′44″N 2°15′40″W	Category C(S)	2726	Upload Photo
5 Pennan				57°40′44″N 2°15′31″W	Category C(S)	2755	Upload Photo
11 Pennan				57°40′44″N 2°15′34″W	Category C(S)	2758	Upload Photo
31, 32 Pennan				57°40′44″N 2°15′38″W	Category C(S)	2720	Upload Photo
43 Pennan				57°40′44″N 2°15′41″W	Category C(S)	2728	Upload Photo
Old Aberdour, Dovecot at Former Church of Scotland Manse (Beach House Hotel)				57°40′09″N 2°11′42″W	Category B	2746	Upload Photo
Pennan, Craigielar Cottages, Seaview and Denview				57°40′41″N 2°15′32″W	Category C(S)	2751	Upload Photo
1 Pennan				57°40′45″N 2°15′30″W	Category C(S)	2752	Upload Photo
23 Pennan				57°40′44″N 2°15′37″W	Category C(S)	2765	Upload Photo
New Aberdour, Commercial Hotel				57°39′27″N 2°11′43″W	Category B	2773	Upload Photo

== Key ==
The scheme for classifying buildings in Scotland is:

- Category A: "buildings of national or international importance, either architectural or historic; or fine, little-altered examples of some particular period, style or building type."
- Category B: "buildings of regional or more than local importance; or major examples of some particular period, style or building type, which may have been altered."
- Category C: "buildings of local importance; lesser examples of any period, style, or building type, as originally constructed or moderately altered; and simple traditional buildings which group well with other listed buildings."

In March 2016 there were 47,288 listed buildings in Scotland. Of these, 8% were Category A, and 50% were Category B, with the remaining 42% being Category C.

== See also ==
- List of listed buildings in Aberdeenshire
- Scheduled monuments in Aberdeenshire
