= Iye Mackay, 4th of Strathnaver =

Scottish clan chief (d. 1370)

Iye Mackay, 4th of Strathnaver (died 1370) was the chief of the ancient Clan Mackay, a Scottish clan of the Scottish Highlands. He was murdered along with his eldest son Donald at Dingwall Castle during a feud with the Earl of Sutherland, chief of the Clan Sutherland.

== Early life ==
Iye Mackay was the son of Donald Mackay, 3rd of Strathnaver and his wife who was a daughter of Iye (MacNeil) of Gigha.

== Feud with the Earl of Sutherland ==
Between Iye Mackay, 4th of Strathnaver and the Sutherland family there was a feud that caused much blood-shed on either side. According to Sir Robert Gordon, 1st Baronet (1580 – 1656), who was a younger son of Alexander Gordon, 12th Earl of Sutherland, "the Earl of Sutherland had great controversy with the house and family of Mackay, chief of the Clan Vic-Morgan of Stathnaver, which did continue a long time between the inhabitants of Sutherland and Strahnaver, although with some intermission". According to historian Angus Mackay, this account corroborates with a complaint made by William, 5th Earl of Sutherland in 1342 when he applied to the Pope for a dispensation of marriage with Margaret Bruce (daughter of Robert I of Scotland) against "an ancient enemy" who caused "wars, disputes and many offences, in these parts". According to historian William Fraser, if as contended the Mackays are descendants of Malcolm MacHeth, 1st Earl of Ross, then it would make sense for them to be referred to as an ancient enemy of the Sutherlands, as the MacHeths gave trouble to the Scottish kings and their henchmen in the north the Earls of Sutherland.

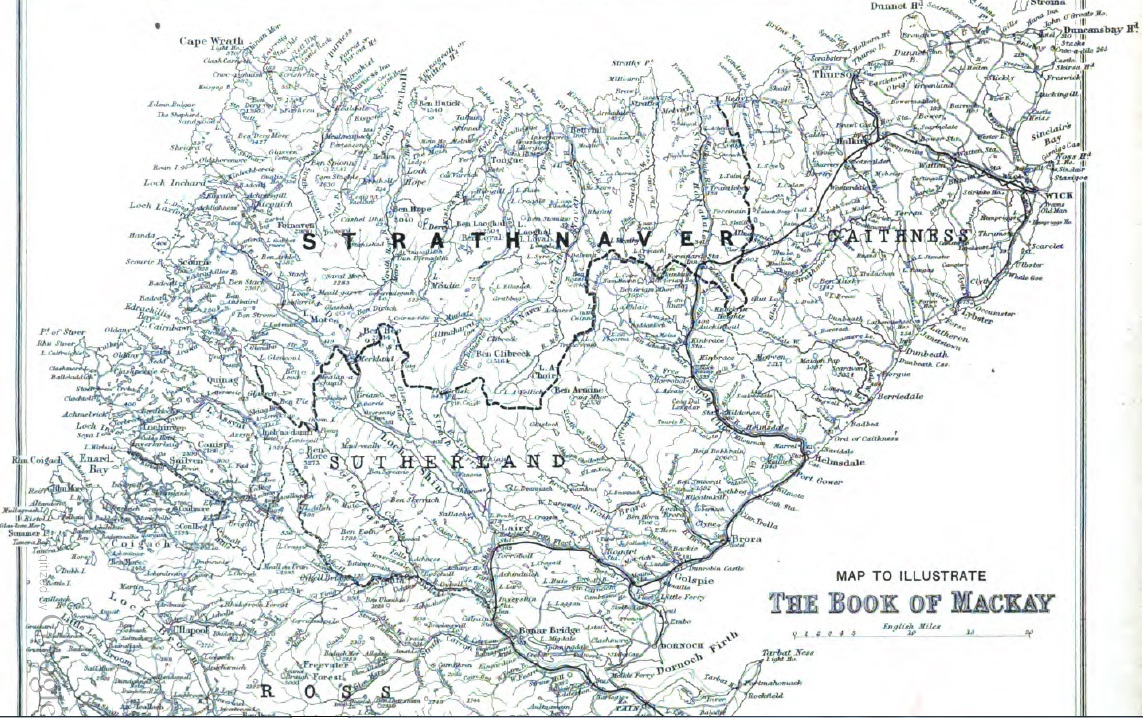
Map showing the Mackay chief’s territory of Strathnaver in relation to the lands of Sutherland, held by the Earl of Sutherland

According to the Blackcastle MS (which was written by Alexander Mackay of Blackcastle who had access to the Mackay chief’s family charters and papers), a meeting was arranged in 1370 at Dingwall between the Earl of Sutherland and Mackay to settle the dispute. Present at the meeting was the Earl of Sutherland along with his brother Nicholas Sutherland, 1st of Duffus and Iye Mackay along with his son Donald. Mackay was about to succeed in his claim and the Sutherlands became so irritated that Nicholas Sutherland rose in the night and murdered both Iye Mackay and his son Donald. Sir Robert Gordon’s version of events agrees with this account, but he adds that the meeting actually took place at Dingwall Castle. Gordon also adds that one of arbiters was the Lord of the Isles. Historian Angus Mackay concludes that the Earl of Ross would also have been one of the arbiters of a case tried in his own castle and that it is not unlikely that the Earl of Buchan who was justiciar for the north would also have been present.

Angus Mackay gives some background information as to what may have caused the feud between the Mackays and Sutherlands: In 1345, David II of Scotland granted a charter to the Earl of Sutherland and his wife Margaret Bruce who was the sister of David II which gave Sutherland almost kingly powers in Sutherland. The Earl had only one son with Margaret Bruce, John of Sutherland, who was to succeed the childless David II of Scotland as king. However, John of Sutherland died of plague in London and David was succeeded in the throne by his nephew, Robert II of Scotland. Around this time the king's physician was Farquhar Mackay, son of Iye Mackay, 4th of Strathnaver, member of the family that was the Sutherland’s "ancient enemy". Farquhar Mackay had also received a charter from the Earl of Buchan, confined by the king for the lands of Melness in the parish of Durness. (Note: In modern times Melness is situated within the boundaries of the parish of Tongue. However, before 1724 the parish of Durness was a larger parish that included the lands that make up the modern parishes of both Tongue and Eddrachilles.) It suited royal policy to put pressure upon the Earl of Sutherland by favouring their "ancient enemy", Mackay of Strathnaver. Although the regality of the Earl of Sutherland did not include Strathnaver, Iye Mackay of Strathnaver also held lands in Sutherland, close to the borders of Ross-shire, and vexing the claim of Sutherland's powers of regality over him, tried to have the matter submitted to arbitration when in favourable circumstances. Thus just when Mackay was in sight of receiving a favourable judgement, he and his son were killed by Nicolas Sutherland in the dead of night at Dingwall Castle.

== Family ==
The known children of Iye Mackay, 4th of Strathnaver were:

1. Donald Mackay, 5th of Strathnaver, murdered with his father at Dingwall Castle in 1370.
2. Farquhar Mackay, physician to Robert II of Scotland.
3. Mariota Mackay, who was the wife of Alexander Stewart, Earl of Buchan, otherwise known as the Wolf of Badenoch.

Iye Mackay, 4th of Strathnaver was succeeded by his grandson Angus Mackay, 6th of Strathnaver, eldest son of Iye's son Donald.

== See also ==
- Chiefs of Clan Mackay
- Clan Mackay
- William de Moravia, 5th Earl of Sutherland
- Earl of Sutherland
- Clan Sutherland
