= Formartine =

Committee area in Aberdeenshire, Scotland

Coordinates: 57°23′46″N 2°17′13″W

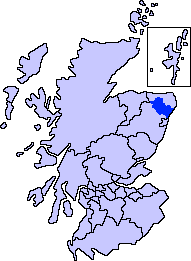
Map of Scotland showing the present-day committee area of Formartine

Formartine (Scottish Gaelic: Fearann Mhàrtainn meaning "Martin's land") is a committee area in Aberdeenshire, Scotland. This district extends north from the River Don to the River Ythan. It has a population of 43,243 (2021 Census).

The committee area was established in 1996 as one of six area committees of Aberdeenshire Council following local government reorganisation under the Local Government etc. (Scotland) Act 1994.

Formartine has experienced rapid population growth, particularly around Ellon and Oldmeldrum, and in the south east where development has spread outwith the city of Aberdeen. By contrast, the area around Turriff retains strong dependency on the traditional agricultural economy. The area's coastline and rural environment offer recreation potential including the Formartine and Buchan Way.

== History ==
The early history of this locale is evidenced by the survival of a number of prehistoric features, including a number of tumuli.

Formartine is first documented as a thanage in 1266, when Reginald Cheyne is recorded holding it in feu-ferm and liable for 14 1/2 merks as 2nd teinds payable to the Diocese of Aberdeen. This would have valued the thanage in 1266 at £96 13s 4d, though by the time of the Alexander III rental this had increased to £106 13s 4d.

The thanage's origins probably lay as one of the shires within the province of Buchan that paid tribute to the King of Alba rather than the Mormaer of Buchan. The thanage had its main centre at Fyvie, and it included a large royal forest for hunting. Formartine lay between two areas within the Earldom of Buchan: Ellon to the north east, which was the caput of the earldom, and the detached area of Bethelnie (now Oldmeldrum) to the south west.

Some time between 1292 and 1296 John de Balliol, then King of Scotland, alienated the thanage to John Comyn, Earl of Buchan, as compensation for Comyn's renunciation of his claim to part of the Lordship of Galloway, Balliol's ancestral lordship. This effectively extended the bounds of the Earldom southward, though the burgh and castle of Fyvie remained in crown hands.

The thanage must later have been escheated and returned to crown hands, as between 1341 and 1346 David II granted half of Formartine to his sister Margaret and her husband William de Moravia, 5th Earl of Sutherland, and the other half to another of his sisters Matilda and her husband Thomas Isaac. Formartine reverted again to the crown in 1373 on the death of the Earl of Sutherland, and was granted in 1377 to John, Earl of Carrick, the heir to the throne, and then in 1382 as a barony to James Lindsay, the son of David Lindsay of Crawford, and Carrick compensated with a £100 per year annuity.

== Bibliography ==
- Broun, Dauvit (2015). "Statehood and lordship in 'Scotland' before the mid-twelfth century". Innes Review. 66 (1): 1–71. doi:10.3366/inr.2015.0084.
- Grant, Alexander (1993). "Thanes and Thanages, from the Eleventh to the Fourteenth Centuries". In Grant, Alexander; Stringer, Keith J. (eds.). Medieval Scotland: Crown, Lordship & Community. Edinburgh: Edinburgh University Press. pp. 39–81. ISBN 0748604189.
- Young, Alan (1993). "The Earls and Earldom of Buchan in the Thirteenth Century". In Grant, Alexander; Stringer, Keith J. (eds.). Medieval Scotland: Crown, Lordship & Community. Edinburgh: Edinburgh University Press. pp. 174–202. ISBN 0748604189.
