= Siege of Perth (1339) =

Siege of Perth, Scotland

- Part of the Second War of Scottish Independence
| Date | June – 17 August 1339 |
| Location | Perth, Scotland 56°23′45″N 03°26′00″W |
| Result | Scottish victory |

Belligerents
| Kingdom of Scotland | Kingdom of England |

Commanders and leaders
| Robert Stewart; Earl of Ross; Earl of March; William Douglas; William Bullock; Hugh Hampyle | Thomas Ughtred (surrendered) |
- Location within Perth and Kinross

The siege of Perth was conducted from June to August 1339 as part of the Second War of Scottish Independence. The siege was conducted by forces loyal to David II of Scotland and commanded by Robert Stewart, the Guardian of Scotland. The defending forces were acting on behalf of Edward Balliol and were commanded by Thomas Ughtred.

Balliol had invaded Scotland in 1332 with the support of Edward III of England, taking advantage of the fact that Scotland had no strong leader following the death of Robert Bruce, to press his own claim to the throne. Balliol was crowned at Scone and from 1333 his regime was based in Perth. An English garrison was based in the town from 1335. From 1338 Stewart was Guardian of Scotland and was targeting the areas of Scotland sympathetic to the Balliol cause.

Ughtred was forced to surrender on 17 August after 10 weeks of siege, during which the attacking force had deployed a group of barges to the Tay estuary to prevent supplies arriving by water.

== Background ==
=== Wars of Scottish Independence ===
The Wars of Scottish Independence began in 1296 when Edward I of England attempted to enforce his claims to the overlordship of Scotland. This conflict was ended in 1328 by the Treaty of Edinburgh negotiated by a regency government during the minority of Edward III of England, following several victories by King Robert Bruce of Scotland and those loyal to him.

Like many English Edward III disliked this treaty and supported a group known as the Disinherited who held claims to lands and titles in Scotland which they were stripped of by the successes of the Bruce faction. Following Robert's death in 1329 he was succeeded by his infant son, David II. Taking advantage of a minor ruling Scotland an invasion was launched in August 1332 in support of Edward Balliol and his claim to the Scottish throne as the son of John Balliol who had ruled Scotland in 1296. Despite being very heavily outnumbered Balliol's force won a crushing victory against David's partisans at the battle of Dupplin Moor just outside Perth on 11 August. This marked the start of the Second War of Scottish Independence. Balliol was crowned king of Scotland at Scone on 24 September. In December Balliol thanked Edward III for his support by granting most of Southern Scotland to him.

The insecurity of Balliol's position prompted Edward III to intervene directly in 1333. In 1334 David was moved to Château Gaillard in France for his own protection and Balliol controlled southern Scotland. Robert Stewart became Guardian of Scotland in 1338 following the death of his predecessor, Andrew Murray, who had launched a series of raids on northern England following his successes in Scotland. Stewart changed these tactics, with the Bruce faction instead focusing on changing the allegiance of those areas still sympathetic to the Balliol and English cause. By 1339 the only areas controlled by Balliol's supporters north of the river Forth were Stirling, Perth and Cupar in Fife, while guerrillas commanded by William Douglas held a large measure of control over the lowlands.

=== Perth ===
Balliol's regime was based at Perth from 1333. An English garrison was established in the town in 1335 following a campaign led by Balliol and Edward III. In 1336 Edward III strengthened the town's defences by building stone walls on three sides and three towers. Six nearby monasteries were required to pay for these improvements. Thomas Ughtred left Hull on 12 March 1337 with 240 men to take command of Perth. An indenture from 4 August 1338 allowed him a garrison of 460 men in peacetime and 800 in time of war, although these were unrealistic targets. Within a few months Ughtred was asking to be relieved of command, complaining that his men were not receiving sufficient supplies. With the northern garrisons becoming increasingly difficult to supply across hostile land, supplies were being shipped from Hull and King's Lynn. From April 1339 this supply line came under attack from a small fleet hired in France.

== Siege ==
Stewart began the siege in June 1339, accompanied by the earls of Ross and March. They were later joined by Douglas who had hired the services of Hugh Hampyle, a French pirate who commanded a group of five barges. Douglas had also recruited a force of Scots in exile at the court of Chateau Gaillard who were accompanied by several French knights with their retainers.

Hampyle's forces guarded the Tay estuary to prevent supplies from reaching the town and to prevent the inhabitants seeking help. Hampyle's best ship was captured, either while maintaining this blockade or possibly while attempting to storm the town, and he seems to have mounted a separate operation to recover it. Miners provided by the earl of Ross were able to drain the town's moat. Attempts were also made to undermine the walls.

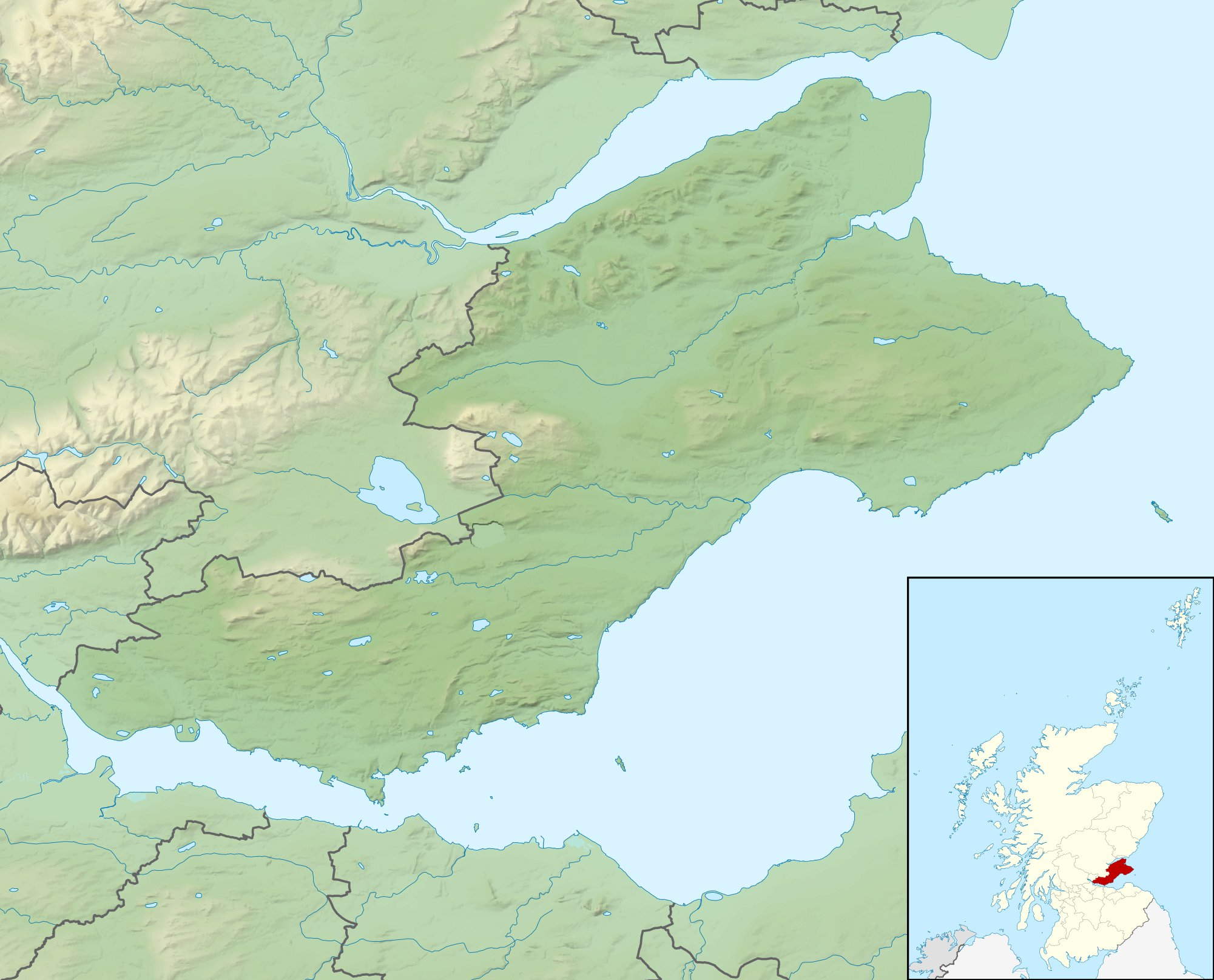
Location of Cupar castle relative to Perth

Parallel to the siege of Perth, Douglas managed to convince William Bullock, Balliol's commander of Cupar Castle, to join the Bruce faction in return for an award of land and possessions. The chronicler John of Fordun writes that Bullock "offered useful advice and brought appropriate help to the besiegers", including advising moving the protective shelters closer to the walls to better protect against crossbowmen.

Short of supplies, Ughtred was compelled to surrender on 17 August, by which point the siege had lasted 10 weeks. The English troops were allowed to return home.

In October a warrant was issued to pay the wages of 1,264 men from Cumberland and Westmorland, who under the command of Balliol and others were to raise the siege of Perth. Unable to complete this objective the force instead seems to have spent three weeks raiding elsewhere in Scotland.

== Aftermath ==
Following his surrender, Ughtred faced accusations of cowardice and in October 1339 succeeded in clearing his name during an inquiry in parliament.

After the capture of Perth and Cupar the Bruce faction besieged Stirling Castle, but quarrels between the nobles led to the departure of the Earl of Ross.The Bruce faction had reclaimed Edinburgh in 1341 and David was able to return to Scotland in June. Stirling fell in 1342, the same year as Roxburgh.

David was compelled to attack England, partly to receive recognition of his right to the Scottish throne and partly out of gratitude to France. This led to his capture in October 1346 at the battle of Neville's Cross in County Durham. He would be released in October 1357 following negotiations which included him being recognised as king by the English. Balliol had ceded his claim to the throne to Edward in 1356, pleading infirmity and old age. In return he received an annuity of 2,000 pounds which was paid until his death in 1364.

== Sources ==
- Archibald, Malcolm (2016). Dance If Ye Can: A Dictionary of Scottish Battles. Creativia. ISBN 978-1536821796.
- Ayton, Andrew (2008). "Ughtred, Thomas, first Lord Ughtred". Oxford Dictionary of National Biography (online ed.). Oxford University Press. doi:10.1093/ref:odnb/27980. (Subscription, Wikipedia Library access or UK public library membership required.)
- Brooks, Richard (2005). Cassell's battlefields of Britain and Ireland. London: Weidenfeld & Nicolson. ISBN 0-304-36333-2.
- Brown, Chris (2006). The second Scottish Wars of Independence. Stroud, Gloucestershire: Tempus. ISBN 0-7524-3812-3.
- DeVries, Kelly (1998). Infantry Warfare in the Early Fourteenth Century : Discipline, Tactics, and Technology. Woodbridge, Suffolk; Rochester, New York: Boydell & Brewer. ISBN 978-0-85115-571-5.
- Lynch, Michael (1992). Scotland: a new history. London: Pimlico. ISBN 978-0-712-69893-1.
- MacInnes, Iain A. (2016). Scotland's Second War of Independence, 1332-1357. Boydell & Brewer. ISBN 978-1-78327-144-3.
- Rogers, Clifford (2014) [2000]. War Cruel and Sharp: English Strategy under Edward III, 1327–1360. Woodbridge, Suffolk: Boydell Press. ISBN 978-0-8511-5804-4.
- Sumption, Jonathan (29 September 1999). The Hundred Years War, Volume 1: Trial by Battle. University of Pennsylvania Press. ISBN 978-0-8122-1655-4.
- Watson, Fiona (2007). "Independence, Wars of". In Lynch, Michael (ed.). The Oxford companion to Scottish history. New York: Oxford University Press. ISBN 9780199234820.
- Webster, Bruce (2004a). "Balliol, Edward". Oxford Dictionary of National Biography (online ed.). Oxford University Press. doi:10.1093/ref:odnb/1206. (Subscription, Wikipedia Library access or UK public library membership required.)
- Webster, Bruce (2004b). "Bullock, William". Oxford Dictionary of National Biography (online ed.). Oxford University Press. doi:10.1093/ref:odnb/54145. (Subscription, Wikipedia Library access or UK public library membership required.)
