= William de Moravia, 5th Earl of Sutherland =

Scottish noble

- de Moravia Earl of Sutherland Coat of Arms
- Born: Unknown
- Died: 1370; Sutherland, Scotland
- Relatives: Kenneth de Moravia, 4th Earl of Sutherland (father); Margaret Bruce (wife); John of Sutherland (son); Robert Sutherland, 6th Earl of Sutherland (son)
- Military career
- Allegiance: Scotland
- Conflicts: Siege of Kildrummy Castle (1335); Battle of Culblean; Siege to Cupar Castle; Foray into England (1340); Capture of Roxburgh Castle; Battle of Neville's Cross

William de Moravia (also known as William Sutherland) (died 1370) was the 5th Earl of Sutherland and chief of the Clan Sutherland, a Scottish clan of the Scottish Highlands. William, 5th Earl of Sutherland was a loyal supporter of David II of Scotland in the wars against England.

== Early life ==
He was the son of Kenneth de Moravia, 4th Earl of Sutherland and Mary (or Marjorie) of Mar. He succeeded his father in 1333.

== Earl of Sutherland ==
=== Wars of Scottish Independence ===
According to 17th-century historian Sir Robert Gordon, 1st Baronet, William, 5th Earl of Sutherland joined Andrew Moray and the Earl of Dunbar in raising the siege of Kildrummy Castle and also took part in the Battle of Culblean on 30 November 1335. However, according to 19th-century historian William Fraser this statement has no supporting evidence other than that of an English chronicler who recorded that the Earl of Sutherland along with the Earls of Fife, Dunbar and March had laid siege to Cupar Castle in Fife which was then held by William Bullock in the English interest. This siege failed however because Sir John Stirling, the Scottish but pro-English Constable of Edinburgh Castle, took 120 men who attacked the besiegers. This account is corroborated by Sir John's account in the English Exchequer. In 1340, the Earl of Sutherland joined the Earl of March in a foray into England but they were repulsed by Sir Thomas Grey who himself recorded the incident in his Scalacronica.

David II of Scotland having spent nine years in France returned to his own kingdom in 1341 and appears to have highly favoured the Earl of Sutherland. According to Sir Robert Gordon, William, Earl of Sutherland succeeded in taking Roxburgh Castle back from the English. However, according to Sir William Fraser, Gordon misplaces this to the year 1340 immediately after the foray into England when Roxburgh Castle was actually re-captured two years later in 1342.

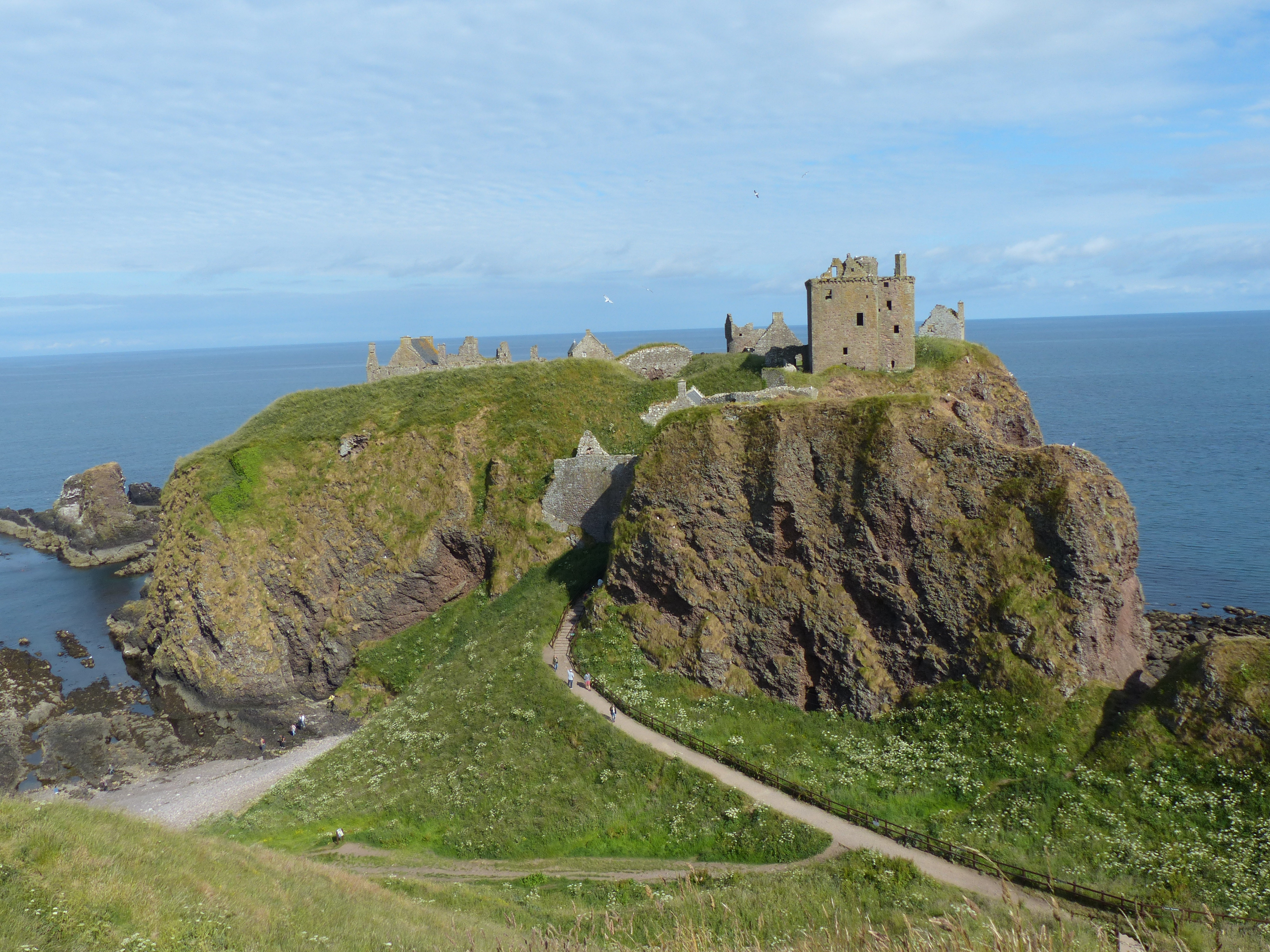
Dunnottar Castle that was granted to the Earl of Sutherland in 1346

William, Earl of Sutherland married Margaret Bruce, a daughter of King Robert the Bruce (Robert I of Scotland) and his second wife Elizabeth de Burgh. There was a papal dispensation for the marriage issued at the end of 1342. David II of Scotland subsequently conferred upon his brother-in-law the Earl of Sutherland various charters of lands in rapid succession. These included the thanage of Downie in Forfarshire in September 1345, the thanages of Kincardine, with Fettercairn and Aberluthnot, and half of the thanages of Formartine and Kintore in Aberdeenshire. The latter charter included that upon the death of the grantees all the lands were to revert to the Crown, but saving the right for Matilda Bruce, the king's elder sister, the other half of the thanages of Formartine and Kintore, should she survive her sister Margaret.

In 1346, the Earl of Sutherland and his countess received a grant for the important stronghold of Dunnottar Castle in The Mearns. The charter included a licence for the earl to build a fortalice upon it. However, according to William Fraser it is not known if the Earl of Sutherland built a fort on the site and that the building that is there is usually attributed to Sir William Keith, Marischal of Scotland and that the Earl of Sutherland probably departed with Dunnottar Castle in 1358. Also in 1346, the Earl of Sutherland joined the Scottish army that mustered at Perth and invaded England, subsequently being defeated at the Battle of Neville's Cross. An English historian puts him among those killed, but William Fraser states that this is erroneous and that he was actually among those taken prisoner. In June 1351, the Earl of Sutherland is mentioned in a safe conduct for him to attend a conference at Newcastle upon Tyne for the ransom of David II of Scotland. In September of the same year, he was one of a party who escorted King David back into Scotland, while his son, John of Sutherland, himself a nephew of the king, was used as a hostage in England for King David to be returned to England. In 1354, John of Sutherland again appears as a hostage for King David. In 1356, the treaty between England and Scotland was broken but renewed in 1357 and the Earl of Sutherland was deputed by the Scottish parliament to complete the negotiations. In October 1357, the Earl of Sutherland and his son John of Sutherland, were exchanged for King David to return to Scotland while they travelled to London and remained in the care of the Chancellor of England. The earl remained in England for ten years and he is recorded in safe conducts at intervals for himself or his servants to pass back and forth from England to Scotland.

=== Lands and charters ===
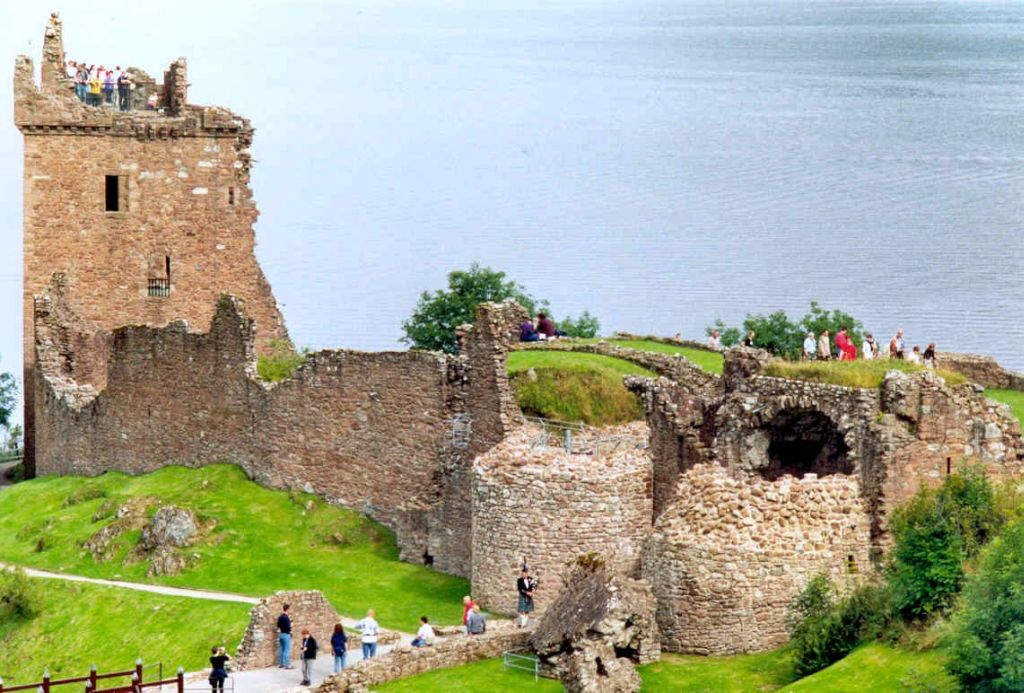
Urquhart Castle was granted to the Earl of Sutherland in 1358

In 1358, the Earl of Sutherland resigned all of his lands in Kincardine into the hands of the king who in turn bestowed upon the earl and his son John, the barony of Urquhart and Urquhart Castle in Inverness-shire. However, the king later re-conferred to the earl the baronies of Downie, Kincardine and Aberluthnot.

In September 1360, the Earl of Sutherland granted a charter to his brother, Nicholas Sutherland, 1st of Duffus, from this Nicholas Sutherland descended the Sutherland Lairds of Duffus. In 1362, the earl granted the chapel of St John the Baptist at Helmsdale to the monks of Kinloss Abbey. In 1362, the earl along with his second countess, Joanna daughter of Sir John Menteith, were given special permission to visit the shrine of St Thomas at Canterbury Cathedral. In December 1364, the earl had a safe conduct into Scotland which lasted by extension until September 1367, with him and his countess returning to England in March 1367. This was the last safe conduct granted and he was liberated shortly afterwards. During one of his visits to Scotland, the earl granted a charter to John of Tarale or Terrell for the six davochs of land in Strathfleet which was confirmed by King David of Scotland in 1363. In 1365, the king granted to the Earl of Sutherland and his male heirs half the thanage of Formartine in Aberdeenshire, which had already been granted to him for life. Between 1360 and 1365, the earl received various sums of money from the Exchequer of Scotland in addition to £80 from King David for his expenses in England.

=== Feud with the Mackays of Strathnaver ===
Between Iye Mackay, 4th of Strathnaver and the Sutherland family there was a feud that caused much blood-shed on either side. According to Sir Robert Gordon, 1st Baronet, who was a younger son of Alexander Gordon, 12th Earl of Sutherland, "the Earl of Sutherland had great controversy with the house and family of Mackay, chief of the Clan Vic-Morgan of Stathnaver, which did continue a long time between the inhabitants of Sutherland and Strahnaver, although with some intermission". According to historian Angus Mackay, this account corroborates with a complaint made by William, 5th Earl of Sutherland in 1342 when he applied to the Pope for a dispensation of marriage with Margaret Bruce (daughter of Robert I of Scotland) against "an ancient enemy" who caused "wars, disputes and many offences, in these parts". According to historian William Fraser, if as contended the Mackays are descendants of Malcolm MacHeth, 1st Earl of Ross, then it would make sense for them to be referred to as an ancient enemy of the Sutherlands, as the MacHeths gave trouble to the Scottish kings and their henchmen in the north the Earls of Sutherland.

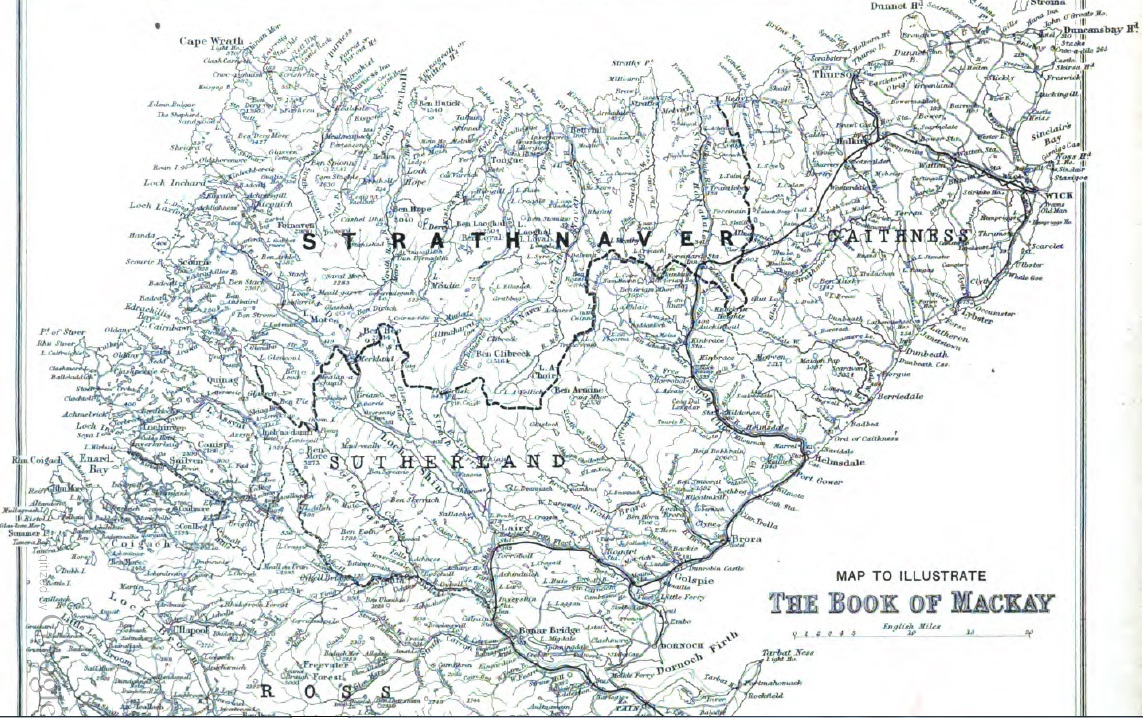
Map showing the Mackay chief's territory of Strathnaver in relation to the lands of Sutherland, held by the Earl of Sutherland and the lands of Ross to the south

According to the Blackcastle MS (which was written by Alexander Mackay of Blackcastle who had access to the Mackay chief's family charters and papers), a meeting was arranged in 1370 at Dingwall between the Earl of Sutherland and Mackay to settle the dispute. Present at the meeting was the Earl of Sutherland along with his brother Nicholas Sutherland, 1st of Duffus and Iye Mackay along with his son Donald. Mackay was about to succeed in his claim and the Sutherlands became so irritated that Nicholas Sutherland rose in the night and murdered both Iye Mackay and his son Donald. Sir Robert Gordon's version of events agrees with this account, but he adds that the meeting actually took place at Dingwall Castle. Gordon also adds that one of arbiters was the Lord of the Isles. Historian Angus Mackay concludes that the Earl of Ross would also have been one of the arbiters of a case tried in his own castle and that it is not unlikely that the Earl of Buchan who was justiciar for the north would also have been present.

Angus Mackay gives some background information as to what may have caused the feud between the Mackays and Sutherlands: In 1345, David II of Scotland granted a charter to the Earl of Sutherland and his wife Margaret Bruce who was the sister of David II which gave Sutherland almost kingly powers in Sutherland. The Earl had only one son with Margaret Bruce, John of Sutherland, who was to succeed the childless David II of Scotland as king. However, John of Sutherland died of plague in London and David was succeeded in the throne by his nephew, Robert II of Scotland. Around this time the king's physician was Farquhar Mackay, son of Iye Mackay, 4th of Strathnaver, member of the family that was the Sutherland's "ancient enemy". Farquhar Mackay had also received a charter from the Earl of Buchan, confined by the king for the lands of Melness in the parish of Durness. (Note: In modern times Melness is situated within the boundaries of the parish of Tongue. However, before 1724 the parish of Durness was a larger parish that included the lands that make up the modern parishes of both Tongue and Eddrachilles.) It suited royal policy to put pressure upon the Earl of Sutherland by favouring their "ancient enemy", Mackay of Strathnaver. Although the regality of the Earl of Sutherland did not include Strathnaver, Iye Mackay of Strathnaver also held lands in Sutherland, close to the borders of Ross-shire, and vexing the claim of Sutherland's powers of regality over him, tried to have the matter submitted to arbitration when in favourable circumstances. Thus just when Mackay was in sight of receiving a favourable judgement, he and his son were killed by Nicolas Sutherland in the dead of night at Dingwall Castle in 1370.

== Death ==
According to Sir Robert Gordon, William, Earl of Sutherland died in 1370, and Sir William Fraser says that this appears to be corroborated by the fact that in 1371, Urquhart Castle that had belonged to him was then in the hands of the Crown. However, Fraser also states that the evidence is not conclusive and that he may have survived longer even though he does not appear on record after 27 February 1369–70. It has been speculated that the Earl of Sutherland was killed in 1370 in revenge for the murder of the Mackay chiefs by his brother in the same year. It is confirmed that William, Earl of Sutherland was definitely dead before 1389 when his son, Robert, Earl of Sutherland, succeeded him.

== Family ==
He married Margaret Bruce in 1345, a daughter of King Robert the Bruce (Robert I of Scotland) and his second wife Elizabeth de Burgh. There was a papal dispensation for the marriage issued at the end of 1342. With Margaret Bruce, William, Earl of Sutherland only had one son:

1. John of Sutherland, who was to succeed to the throne of Scotland by royal descent through his mother Margaret Bruce, but died of plague in London and so Robert II of Scotland, nephew of David II of Scotland became the next king.

William, Earl of Sutherland married his second wife, Joanna daughter of Sir John Menteith in 1346. They had the following children:

1. Robert Sutherland, 6th Earl of Sutherland (the surname Sutherland now being fully used by the Earls).
2. Kenneth Sutherland, 1st Laird of the Sutherland of Forse family.
3. John Beg Sutherland, 1st Laird of the Sutherland of Langwell family (1st line).

== Notes ==
Peerage of Scotland
Preceded by Kenneth de Moravia	Earl of Sutherland c. 1333 – 1370	Succeeded by Robert Sutherland
