= List of listed buildings in Aberchirder =

This is a list of listed buildings in the parish of Aberchirder in Aberdeenshire, Scotland.

== List ==
Name	Location	Date Listed	Grid Ref. (Note: Sometimes known as OSGB36, the grid reference (where provided) is based on the British national grid reference system used by the Ordnance Survey. • "Guide to National Grid". Ordnance Survey. • "Get-a-map". Ordnance Survey.)	Geo-coordinates	Notes	LB Number (Note: Historic Environment Scotland assign a unique alphanumeric identifier to each designated site in Scotland, for listed buildings this always begins with "LB", for example "LB12345".)	Image
Main Street, Bank House and Clydesdale Bank				57°33′36″N 2°37′49″W	Category B	19913	Upload another image
137 Main Street with Boundary Wall				57°33′42″N 2°37′29″W	Category C(S)	19915	Upload Photo
18 and 19 The Square				57°33′38″N 2°37′45″W	Category B	19934	Upload Photo
30 and 32 Main Street				57°33′34″N 2°37′52″W	Category C(S)	19918	Upload Photo
South Street, Gowanlea with Boundary Wall and Railings				57°33′40″N 2°37′18″W	Category C(S)	19923	Upload Photo
7 South Street				57°33′32″N 2°37′47″W	Category C(S)	19926	Upload Photo
Rear, 19 and 20 South Street				57°33′33″N 2°37′43″W	Category C(S)	19927	Upload Photo
The Square, Victoria Fountain				57°33′37″N 2°37′43″W	Category C(S)	19932	Upload another image
Main Street, New Marnoch Church (Church Of Scotland) with Boundary Wall				57°33′44″N 2°37′20″W	Category B	19914	Upload another image
Main Street, Woodside Cottage				57°33′32″N 2°37′58″W	Category C(S)	19917	Upload Photo
North Street, Steading				57°33′36″N 2°37′48″W	Category C(S)	19919	Upload Photo
North Street, United Presbyterian Church				57°33′37″N 2°37′55″W	Category C(S)	19920	Upload another image
St Marnan's Episcopal Chapel with School, Retaining Wall and Gatepiers				57°33′31″N 2°37′57″W	Category B	19922	Upload another image
23 South Street				57°33′34″N 2°37′40″W	Category B	19928	Upload Photo
51 South Street with Boundary Wall and Railings				57°33′40″N 2°37′22″W	Category C(S)	19929	Upload Photo
148 Main Street				57°33′42″N 2°37′25″W	Category C(S)	19916	Upload Photo
South Street, Laurelbank				57°33′40″N 2°37′17″W	Category C(S)	19925	Upload Photo
10 South Street				57°33′32″N 2°37′45″W	Category B	19930	Upload Photo
12 The Square				57°33′36″N 2°37′45″W	Category C(S)	19933	Upload Photo
South Street, Kinnairdy Lodge with Boundary Wall and Railings				57°33′40″N 2°37′19″W	Category C(S)	19924	Upload Photo
38 South Street				57°33′36″N 2°37′31″W	Category B	19931	Upload Photo
69 North Street				57°33′40″N 2°37′45″W	Category C(S)	19921	Upload Photo

== Key ==
The scheme for classifying buildings in Scotland is:

- Category A: "buildings of national or international importance, either architectural or historic; or fine, little-altered examples of some particular period, style or building type."
- Category B: "buildings of regional or more than local importance; or major examples of some particular period, style or building type, which may have been altered."
- Category C: "buildings of local importance; lesser examples of any period, style, or building type, as originally constructed or moderately altered; and simple traditional buildings which group well with other listed buildings."

In March 2016 there were 47,288 listed buildings in Scotland. Of these, 8% were Category A, and 50% were Category B, with the remaining 42% being Category C.

== See also ==
- List of listed buildings in Aberdeenshire
- Scheduled monuments in Aberdeenshire
