= Berriedale Water =

Coordinates: 58°10′57″N 3°29′46″W

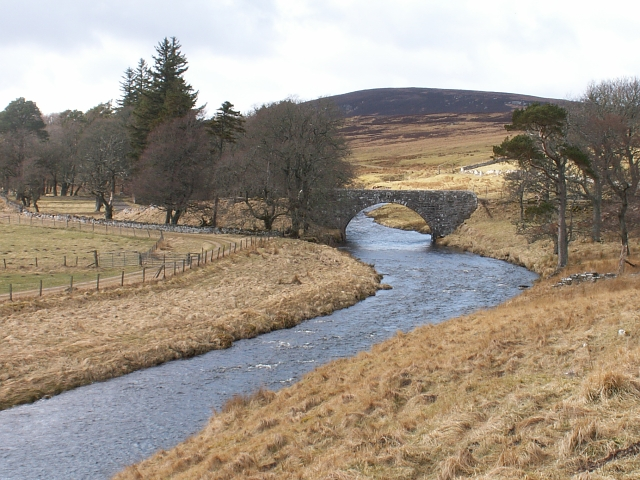

Berriedale Water is a short river in Caithness in northern Scotland. It arises as the Feith Gaineimh Mhor, Feith Chaorunn Mhor and Feith Fhuaran come together at the southern edge of the Flow Country after which it flows generally eastwards to Braemore. Downstream of Braemore it curves to the south within an increasingly narrow valley which continues to the coast at the estate village of Berriedale. It is joined at this point by the Langwell Water, the headwater streams of which lie just to the south of those of Berriedale Water. Like the lower stretches of Berriedale Water, the valley sides become more wooded towards the coast. The 706m high hill of Morven lies on the watershed between the two rivers. The two rivers are crossed by the A9 road at their confluence only a few hundred metres short of the Moray Firth. The remains of Berriedale Castle stand above the mouth on the south side. Berriedale Water is designated a Site of Special Scientific Interest by NatureScot.
