= Inverugie Castle =

- Inverugie, Aberdeenshire, Scotland
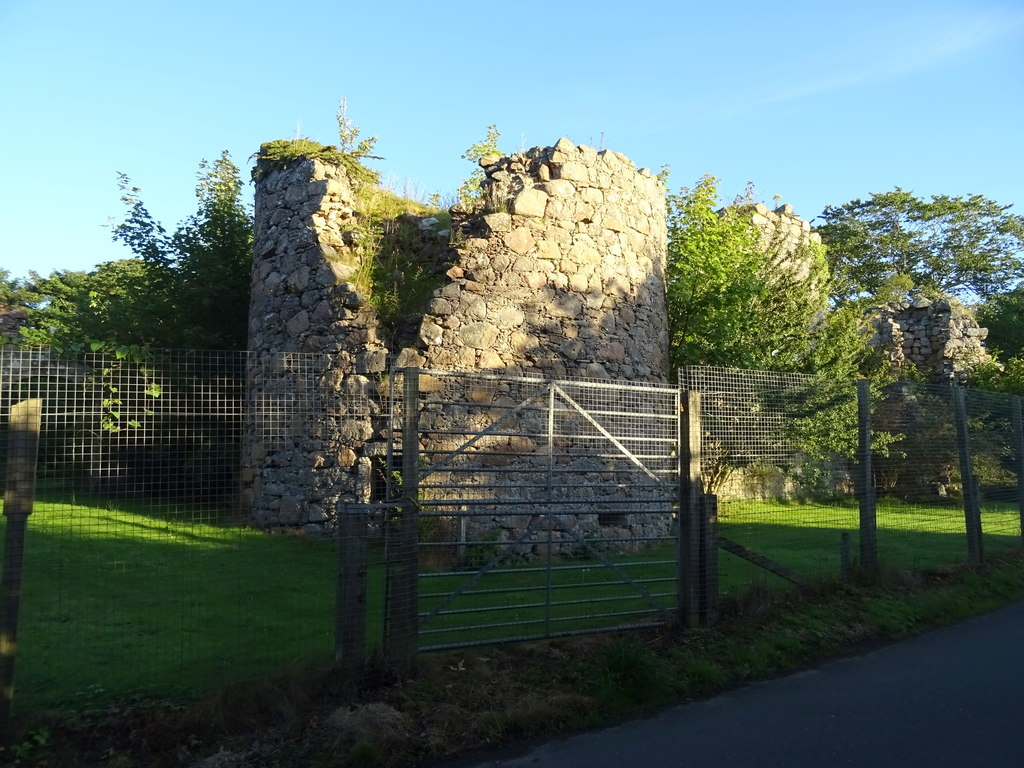
- Inverugie Castle in 2020

Site information
- Type: Motte-and-bailey
- Open to the public: No
- Condition: Ruined

Location
- Coordinates: 57.5252°N 1.8305°W

Site history
- Built: 13th and 17th centuries

Scheduled monument
- Official name: Inverugie Castle
- Type: Secular: castle
- Designated: 30 December 1936
- Reference no.: SM98

Inverugie Castle or Cheyne's Tower is the ruins of a motte-and-bailey castle in Aberdeenshire, Scotland. It is a scheduled monument.

== Location ==
Inverugie Castle is located 2 miles (3.2 km) from Peterhead on the north-east coast. The ruins of the original motte (sometimes called Castle Hill) are a small mound only 3 metres (9.8 ft) high above the River Ugie. Remains of the walls of the later castle are slightly further south.

== History ==
A defensive structure was first built at Inverugie by the Cheyne (Le Chen) family in the 13th or 14th century.

Confusion can occur in historic records with Ravenscraig Castle, known as the Craig of Inverugie, which was also held by the Cheynes and is less than a mile away in a more defensible location, and also an even earlier coastal castle at the mouth of the River Ugie, visible until the late 19th century but now vanished.

In 1345, following the death of Reginald le Chen, Baron Inverugie, the estate of Inverugie was passed onto the Keith Earl Marischals, who had their main seat at the coastal fortress of Dunnottar Castle (via marriage of Edward Keith and the heiress Marjory (or Mariot/Mariota), daughter of Reginald le Chen and Helen de Strathearn). Around 1660, the Keiths built what is the current, but now ruined, castle, lying south of the original wooden motte. Part of the building was referred to as Cheyne's Tower, so may have incorporated earlier masonry.

In the 19th century, an oak heraldry shield was found in a local cottage with the arms of William Keith, 7th Earl Marischal and its date was carved as 1660.

The Keith lands were forfeited after the Jacobite Rebellion and some time after 1745, the Inverugie estate passed from the Keiths to James Ferguson the third Laird of Pitfour who kept the building in a perfect state until he died in 1820. However, the fifth Laird stripped the castle of all the restoration undertaken and his successor worsened the state of neglect.

In 1858, the castle was described as "a picturesque ruin, popular for picnics and pleasure parties". However, by 1890, the castle was in poor condition and was unable to withstand inclement weather. In April 1890, strong winds caused the collapse of some walls and the stair tower. It was declared unsafe by the Local Authority following further storms on New Years Day 1899. The estate factor, William Ainslie, probably acting under instruction from the Laird at that time, arranged to have much of what was left of the ruins blown up, weakening the remaining structure. Within a fortnight, little remained of the castle.

Charles McKean described the castle as "a splendid double-courtyard Renaissance chateau [consisting] of a four-storey block with circular angle towers and a stair turret".

William Burnes or William Burness (1721 – 1784), the father of Robert Burns the poet, was born at Clochnahill Farm, Dunnottar, and trained as a gardener at Inverugie Castle, before moving to Ayrshire.
