= Broomend of Crichie stone =

Pictish symbol stone in Aberdeenshire, Scotland

The Broomend of Crichie Stone
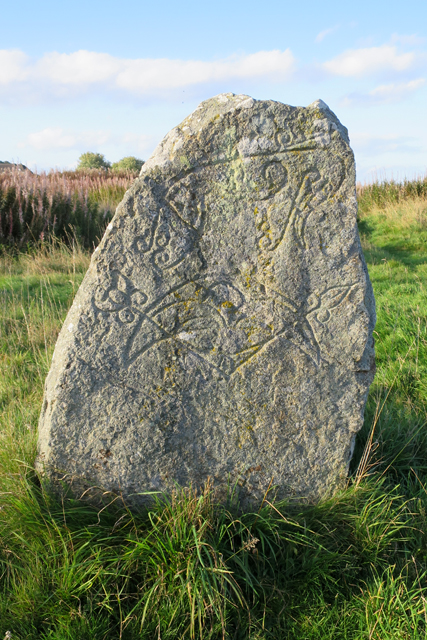
- Broomend of Crichie Stone in 2017
- Symbols: Pictish beast; Crescent and V-rod
- Present location: Port Elphinstone, Inverurie, Aberdeenshire
- Coordinates: 57.2672°N 2.3677°W
- Classification: Class I incised stone
- Culture: Picto-Scottish

Designations

Scheduled monument
- Official name: Broomend Of Crichie
- Type: Crosses and carved stones: symbol stone, Prehistoric ritual and funerary: barrow; henge; standing stone
- Designated: 14 August 1929
- Reference no.: SM18

The Broomend of Crichie Stone is a class I Pictish stone that stands within a henge at Broomend of Crichie, Port Elphinstone, Inverurie, Aberdeenshire, Scotland. It was moved to the centre of the henge in the 19th century from its original location about 65 m to the north-east. The stone is a flat slab bearing the incised symbols of the Pictish beast and the crescent and V-rod.

The henge, with the avenue, standing stones and the symbol stone, is a scheduled monument.
