= William Bullock (chamberlain) =

14th-century Scottish noble

- Chamberlain of Scotland
- Died: c. 1343

William Bullock (died c. 1343), Chamberlain of Scotland, was a Scottish noble.

He was a former ecclesiastical man, who was appointed Chamberlain of Scotland by Edward Balliol in 1334. Bullock while constable of Cupar Castle in 1339, surrendered the castle to William Douglas, Lord of Liddesdale, who had laid siege to the castle, and changed allegiance to the Bruce side. He assisted with the siege of Perth in 1339 and Edinburgh Castle in 1341. He served as Chamberlain of Scotland between 1341 and 1342, under David II of Scotland. Following the murder of Alexander Ramsay of Dalhousie by William Douglas of Liddesdale, David II had Bullock arrested by David de Barclay in 1342, on charges of treason, possibly in retaliation for Ramay's murder but possibly because he was conspiring with the English again. Bullock was imprisoned in Lochinorb Castle and was starved to death.
