= Reginald le Chen (d.1293) =

- Baron Inverugie; Chamberlain of Scotland (1267-1269)
- Noble family: Clan Cheyne
- Spouses: Firstly: daughter of John Comyn of Buchan; Secondly: Eustacia Colville
- Father: Bernard le Chen

Reginald le Chen or Cheyne (died 1293) was the Chamberlain of Scotland from 1267 to 1269. He was the Baron of Inverugie.

Reginald was the son of Bernard le Chen of Inverugie and succeeded his father upon his father's death. His brother was Henry le Chen, Bishop of Aberdeen. He held the office of Sheriff of Kincardine in 1263. He founded a Carmelite monastery in Aberdeen in 1342 and made an endowment to the Benedictines at Fyvie, near Aberdeen, in 1285.

He married firstly an unknown daughter of John Comyn of Buchan and, with her, had Reginald le Chen (d.1312) and Robert le Chen. He married secondly Eustacia Colville, but they had no known issue.

Reginald died in 1293 and was succeeded by his son Reginald.
