= Ravenscraig Castle, Aberdeenshire =

Ravenscraig Castle
- Peterhead, Aberdeenshire in Scotland
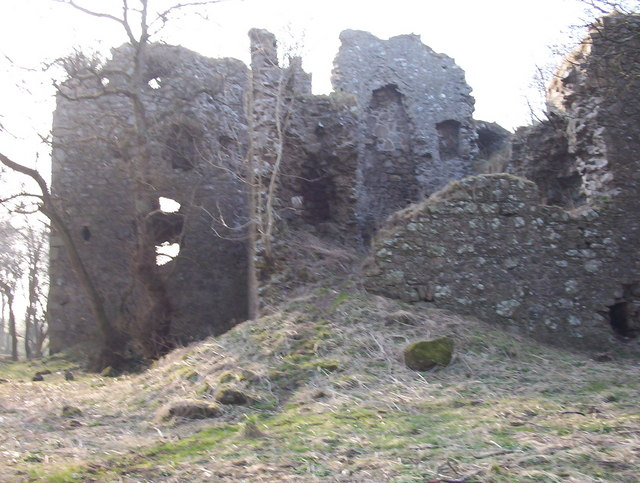
- Ruins of Ravenscraig Castle

Site information
- Condition: Ruined

Location
- Coordinates: 57.5291°N 1.8423°W

Site history
- Built: 15th century

Scheduled monument
- Official name: Ravenscraig Castle
- Type: Secular: castle
- Designated: 30 June 1964
- Reference no.: SM2496

Ravenscraig Castle, also known as the Craig of Inverugie, is a ruined 15th-century (or earlier) L-shaped tower-house located 2 miles north-west of Peterhead, Aberdeenshire, Scotland. It is a scheduled monument.

== History ==
The castle was the seat of the barony of Torthorston (now Torterston), held by the Cheyne family, and passed to the Keiths in the mid-14th century on the death of Sir Reginald Cheyne. It is in a strong defensive position on a rocky crag above the River Ugie, hence its name. A licence was granted to build a new castle in May 1491, with the castle built on the banks of the Ugie and defended by a moat. However, the basic square form and very thick walls built of run-work are typical of the early 13th century, so the fabric of this original castle may have been incorporated in the new one.

Confusion can occur in historic records with Inverugie Castle, which was also held by the Keiths and is less than a mile away in a more accessible location. It was suggested that Craig of Inverugie was the original name and the name Ravenscraig arose after it was ruined, when ravens regularly nested in one of the old chimneys.

It is recorded that King James VI of Scotland visited the Craig of Inverugie in 1589 to attend the wedding of Rebecca Keith and Sir James Gordon of Lesmoir. At that time, the castle belonged to John Keith of Ravenscraig, whose half-brother William Keith of Delny was a courtier and diplomat who had tried to save the life of Mary, Queen of Scots, in 1587.

Most of the castle's decorative features and dressed stone have been robbed; however, the vaulted ground floor and principal apartments on the first are still visible. "A circular stair in the re-entrant angle rose originally above the wall head into a turret."

== Literary inspiration ==
The Mitherless Bairn by William Thom

William Thom was inspired to write this deathless poem after sighting a "pretty governess" in the castle grounds in 1844.
