= Dingwall Castle =

Castle in Dingwall, Scotland

Coordinates: 57.59770°N 4.42195°W

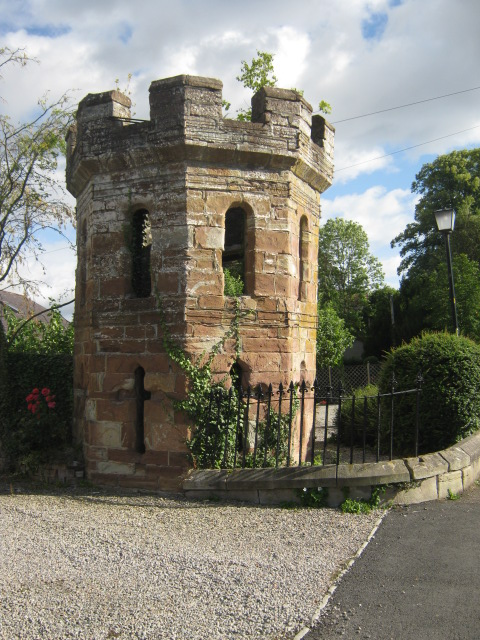
This folly is said to have been built from the stones of Dingwall Castle, on the site of the castle and is one of the few surviving relics of Dingwall Castle.

Dingwall Castle was a medieval fort and royal castle in the town of Dingwall, eastern Ross-shire, Scotland.

The castle is believed to have been established by Norse settlers in the area in the 11th century.

== Wars of Scottish Independence ==
During the Wars of Scottish Independence the castle was garrisoned by the forces of Edward I of England. However it was later captured by Scottish forces for Robert the Bruce led by Uilleam II, Earl of Ross.

From the castle, the Earl of Ross (chief of Clan Ross) led the men of Ross to fight against the English at the Battle of Bannockburn in 1314. As a reward in 1321 King Robert granted Dingwall Castle with the town and lands of Dingwall to the Earl of Ross.

== Murder in the Castle ==
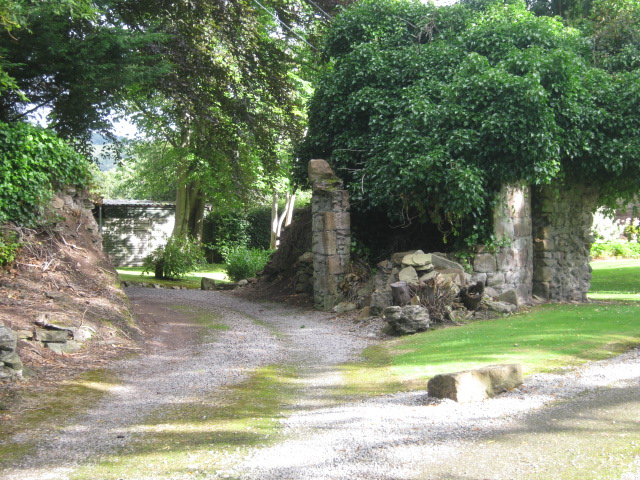
These broken walls are the only remaining ruins of the original Dingwall Castle.

In 1370 a feud arose between William de Moravia, 5th Earl of Sutherland (chief of Clan Sutherland) and Iye Mackay, 4th of Strathnaver (chief of Clan Mackay). A meeting was arranged for them to meet at Dingwall Castle to resolve their issues. However, Iye Mackay and his son Donald Mackay were both murdered in the castle while they were asleep by Nicholas Sutherland, 1st of Duffus, brother of the Earl of Sutherland. See page: Iye Mackay, 4th of Strathnaver for a detailed explanation of the feud.

== Duel ==
Sometime at the beginning of the 15th century a duel is said to have taken place between the governor of the castle, who had been appointed by Robert Stewart, Duke of Albany and Thomas Munro, brother of Hugh Munro, 9th Baron of Foulis (chief of Clan Munro). The two met at the village of Maryburgh and after an argument dirks were pulled and a duel took place in which Thomas Munro killed the governor of Dingwall Castle. The Scottish Castles Association states that the new governor of the castle was "assassinated" by one of the Munroes and replaced by a Mackay.

== Lord of the Isles occupation ==
In 1411 Domhnall of Islay, Lord of the Isles (chief of Clan Donald) captured Dingwall Castle as part of his pursuit of his claim to the earldom of Ross by right of his wife, Mariota Leslie. This took place shortly before the Battle of Harlaw.

In 1436 the next successive Clan Donald chief, Alexander of Islay, Earl of Ross was officially recognized as the Earl of Ross and took up his residence at Dingwall Castle. His son, John of Islay, Earl of Ross was not as successful; the Earldom of Ross was confiscated and the castle became a royal possession once more in 1475. John Munro, 11th Baron of Foulis was then made governor of the castle, who in turn was succeeded by Andrew Munro, 2nd of Milntown. The next governor in 1488 was Sir James Dunbar.

== 16th century ==
In 1507 Andrew Stewart, Bishop of Caithness carried out improvements after the castle had been assaulted by the MacDonalds and Mackenzies, and a new great hall was built. Later governors were John Stewart, 2nd Earl of Atholl (1516 - 1522), James Stewart, 1st Earl of Moray (1501 creation) - brother of James V of Scotland, David Sinclair - until 1550, George Munro, 4th of Milntown also known as "of Docharty" in 1561, Sir Andrew Keith (Lord Dingwall), in 1584, Sir John Preston, later Earl of Desmond, in 1605.

Supporters of Mary, Queen of Scots, captured Dingwall Castle in October 1568.

== Downfall ==
The Crown abandoned Dingwall Castle in about 1600 and it eventually fell into a ruin. The castle ceased to be maintained after the death of King James VI of Scotland in 1625. It was used as a quarry until 1817 when it was finally levelled and only a few fragments remain. The remains are protected as a scheduled monument.

== Tunnel ==
A tunnel still exists that runs from the site of Dingwall Castle to the basement of nearby Tulloch Castle. The tunnel has now collapsed, but it is possible to view this passageway through an air vent on the front lawn of Tulloch Castle's grounds.
