= John of Sutherland =

- Born: 1344; Scotland
- Died: 1361 (aged 16–17); London, England
- Noble family: Earldom of Sutherland; House of Bruce
- Father: William de Moravia, 5th Earl of Sutherland

John of Sutherland, also known as John, Master of Sutherland, or John Sutherland, (born 1344 and died 1361) was a member of the Scottish nobility.

John of Sutherland was the only son of William de Moravia, 5th Earl of Sutherland and Margaret Bruce, daughter of Robert the Bruce (Robert I of Scotland). 14th century chronicler, John of Fordun, states that John of Sutherland's mother Margaret Bruce died after giving birth to him. This is supported by Andrew of Wyntoun whose chronicle was finished between 1420 and 1424. While aged only six or seven, John of Sutherland was used as a hostage for his uncle, David II of Scotland, who had been captured at the Battle of Durham, to return to Scotland from England, and John was then released when King David returned to captivity in England. Andrew of Wyntoun's chronicle states that John of Sutherland died in 1361 in London. Walter Bower, writing much later in the 15th century stated that John of Sutherland died on 8 September 1361 in Lincoln, England.

John of Sutherland was supposed to succeed the childless David II of Scotland as king, but according to Angus Mackay, John of Sutherland died of plague in London. David was therefore succeeded in the throne by his nephew, Robert II of Scotland.

== See also ==
- Earl of Sutherland
- Clan Sutherland
