= Ardlair Stone =

The Ardlair Stone
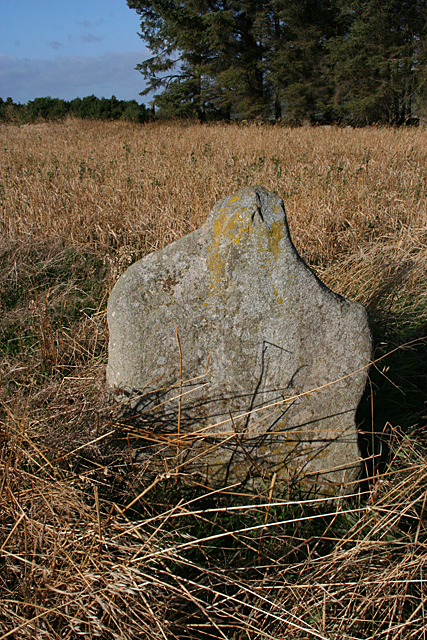
- Ardlair Stone in 2015
- Material: Grey Gneiss
- Symbols: Pictish beast; Tuning fork; Mirror
- Discovered: Identified as Pictish 1901
- Present location: Kennethmont, Aberdeenshire, Scotland
- Coordinates: 57.3385°N 2.7409°W
- Classification: Class I incised stone
- Culture: Picto-Scottish

Designations

Scheduled monument
- Official name: Ardlair Symbol Stone
- Type: Crosses and carved stones: symbol stone, Prehistoric ritual and funerary: standing stone
- Designated: 31 December 1923
- Reference no.: SM65

The Ardlair Stone is a class I Pictish stone that stands in a field in Ardlair, Kennethmont, Aberdeenshire, Scotland. It is associated with a number of other stones that have been proposed by some to be the remains of a recumbent stone circle.

== Description ==
A rough hewn stone of grey Gneiss, the stone was identified as Pictish in 1901. The stone bears the incised symbols of the Pictish beast, the tuning fork and the mirror.
