= Esslemont Castle =

Ruined medieval tower house in Aberdeenshire, Scotland

- Near Ellon, Aberdeenshire, Scotland grid reference NJ932297
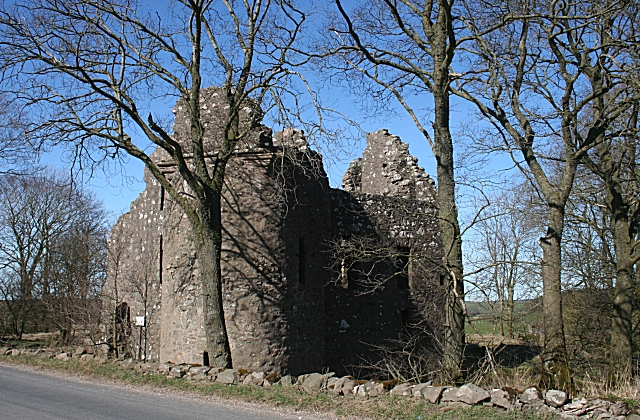
- The castle in 2010

Site information
- Type: Tower house and moat
- Owner: Private
- Controlled by: Clan Gordon (historical)
- Open to the public: No
- Condition: Ruined

Location
- Coordinates: 57.3581°N 2.1141°W

Site history
- Built: mid 14th century-1570
- Built by: various, notably Henry Cheyne
- In use: Until 1769
- Materials: Granite

Scheduled monument
- Official name: Esslemont Castle
- Type: Secular: castle
- Designated: 31 December 1973
- Reference no.: SM3400

Esslemont Castle is a ruined medieval tower house near Ellon in Aberdeenshire, Scotland. It is designated a scheduled monument.

== Etymology ==
The name Esslemont may be of Brittonic origin, from a term cognate with Welsh iselfynydd ("low hill").

== History ==
The earliest known reference to Esslemont is as the “manor of Eislemont” in the 14th century.

The lands of Esslemont passed from the family of Mareschal through the marriage of the heiress Janet to Francis le Chen of Straloch in the 14th century. The castle was burned in 1493. John Cheyne obtained a licence to rebuild from James IV in July 1500. He was permitted to build a tower as high as he liked, with iron yetts, machicolations, portcullis, drawbridges, and other “strengths”. John Cheyne and his kin fought with Duncan Forbes in Aberdeen's Gallowgate in 1503.

In 1564, Patrick Cheyne was created Baron of Esslemont by Queen Mary, who stayed here during her campaign against the Earl of Huntly, and a fortalice and tower were recorded in 1575/1576.

The castle was then destroyed as the result of a feud between the Cheynes and the Hays. The name of the lands appears as “Essilmounthe” in Scottish records in 1609.

The castle ceased to be regularly occupied in 1625, when the estate passed to the Errol family. In 1728, it became the property of Robert Gordon and may have been partially occupied until 1769, when the existing mansion, Esslemont House, was erected in its vicinity.

== Excavations ==
In 1938, excavations within the enclosure revealed the lower courses of an earlier castle, indicating a massive L-shaped tower house with walls 6–7 feet (1.8–2.1 m) thick and a maximum surviving height of 6 feet (1.8 m). There had been a curtain wall 4 feet (1.2 m) thick. The surrounding ditch may date from the 14th century. Finds from the excavation included 14/15th century potsherds, a medallion, and a worn shilling of William III.

== The castle today ==
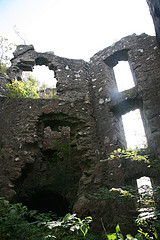
The castle interior

The castle is roofless and missing large sections of its walls, which were reused in building sites nearby. Especially noticeable are the missing dressed stones of the windows. The structure is a L-plan castle with a staircase turret and a round tower at the south-east angle. The main building seems, on the ground floor, to have contained the kitchen, with a wide fireplace in the north gable; the rugged edges of the ruined sides of the flue being visible high up in the gable. Though ruined, the remains still show that there were three stories.

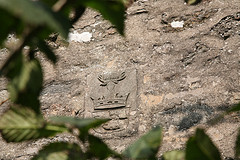
Gordon Arms on Esslemont Castle

The Gordon Arms are visible on the exterior of the castle.

== See also ==
- Clan Gordon
- Earl of Erroll
