= Berriedale, Highland =

Village in Highland, Scotland

Coordinates: 58°11′22″N 03°29′45″W

Berriedale Water Maiden Pap in the background

Berriedale (Scottish Gaelic: Bearghdal) is a small estate village on the northern east coast of Caithness, Scotland, It is situated on the A9 road between Helmsdale and Lybster, close to the boundary between Caithness and Sutherland. It is sheltered from the North Sea at the mouth of two rivers, Langwell Water and Berriedale Water.

Berriedale is located at the end of the eighth stage of the coastal John o' Groats Trail.

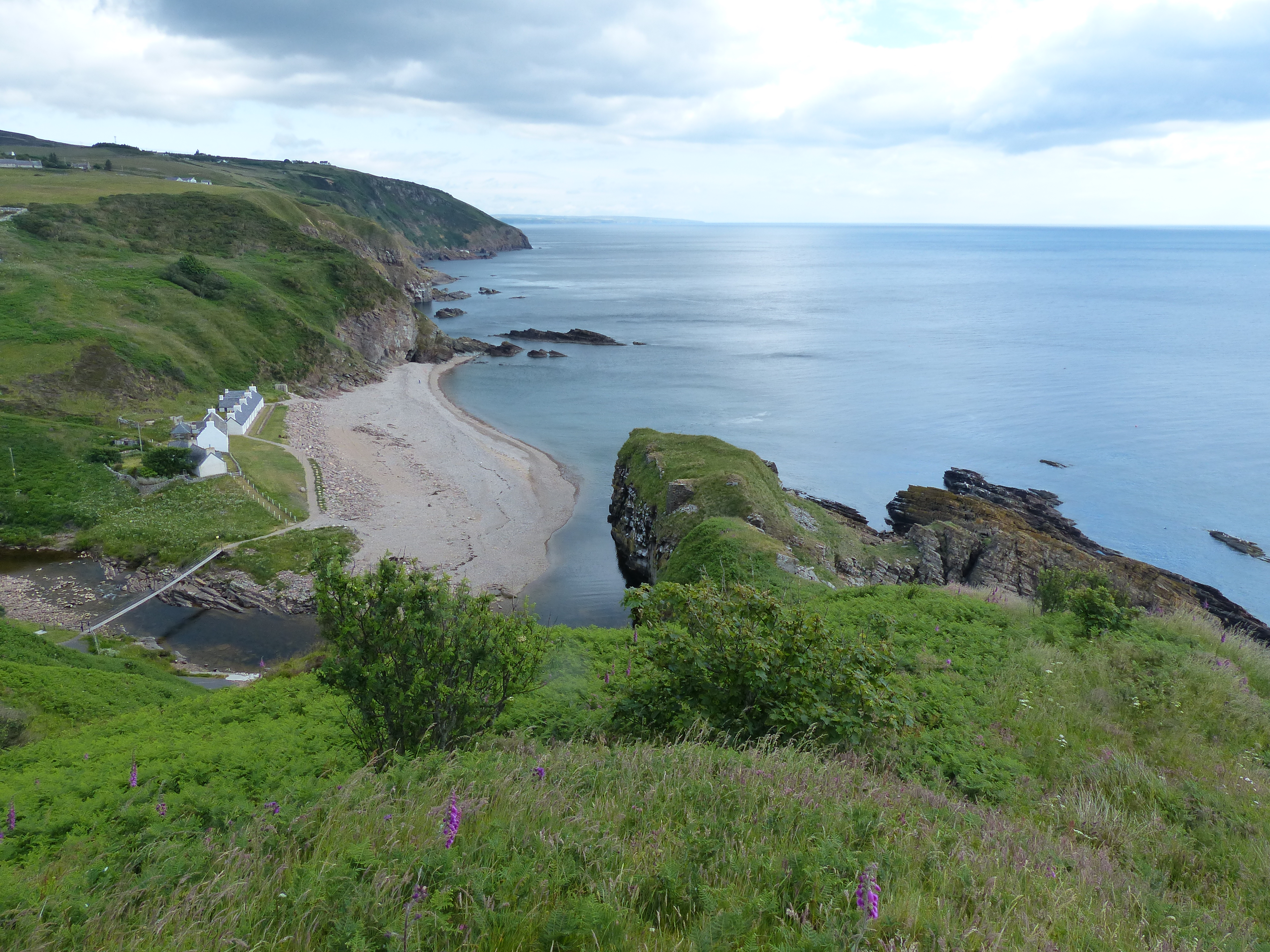
The mouth of Berriedale Water, showing the footbridge and Shore Cottages

== History ==
In about 1815, a formal road was laid out under the plans of Thomas Telford through Berriedale. Two small stone bridges were built to cross the Berriedale and Langwell waters. While the modern A9 has been rerouted across a new bridge, the old bridges remain for pedestrians and are Category C listed.

On 25 September 1920, a memorial was unveiled to honour those who fought in the First World War (those who died from the area in the Second World War were later added to the memorial). The granite memorial on a base of polished Caithness slabs has a bronze memorial plaque and is topped by a bronze statue of Saint Andrew. It is Category B listed and was funded by William Cavendish-Bentinck, 6th Duke of Portland and his wife who owned the surrounding Langdale Estate.

Berriedale is listed as the place of death on the death certificate of Prince George, Duke of Kent, younger brother of King George VI. He was killed in an air crash nearby on 25 August 1942, alongside 14 others.

On 18 September 2014, a lorry suffered brake failure while descending the Braes, resulting in a significant crash and the fatality of the driver.

In January 2024, multiple drivers became stranded in Berriedale due to high levels of snow in a blizzard.

== Buildings ==
The village has a parish church in the Church of Scotland situated up the Brae to the north of the settlement.

The Old Smithy building displays numerous antlers on its external walls.

From the settlement beside the A9, a small road leads down to Berriedale beach where there are a range of cottages beside the river. A further set of coastal cottages line the beach shore and are accessed by a small pedestrian suspension bridge.

=== Berriedale Castle ===
Berriedale castle is a ruined medieval castle that is situated on a rocky outcrop beside Berriedale Water (river). The castle dates to at least the 14th century and has had a succession of owners before being sold to the Earl of Caithness in 1606 whereafter it eventually fell into disuse.

== Transport ==
Just south of Berriedale, on the way to the north, the A9 road passes the Berriedale Braes, a steep drop in the landscape (brae is a Scots word for hillside, a borrowing of the Scottish Gaelic bràighe). The road drops down steeply (13% over 1,3 km) to bridge a river, before rising again (13% over 1,3 km), with a number of sharp bends in the road – although some of the hairpin bends and other nearby gradients have been eased in recent years, with the worse hairpin removal completed in 2020 at a cost of £9.6 million.

The impracticality (and cost) of bridging the Berriedale Braes prevented the building of the Inverness-Wick Far North Line along the east coast of Caithness; instead the railway runs inland through the Flow Country.
