= Cupar Castle =

Location
- Location within Fife
- Coordinates: 56.32002800°N 3.01029150°W

Cupar Castle was a royal castle at Cupar, Fife, Scotland. It was located on a small hill or motte that is known as Castle Hill next to the former Castlehill Primary School in Cupar. No vestiges of the castle remain above ground.

== History ==
The castle was built by the Earls of Fife in the 11th century. King Alexander III's wife Margaret died at the castle on 26 February 1275.

The castle traded hands several times during the first and second Scottish War of Independence.

The castle was surrendered to the English in 1296, and King Edward I of England stayed there for a time. In 1306, Scottish forces led by Robert Wishart, Bishop of Glasgow, attacked the English garrison at the castle and besieged it. Wishart was captured by the English at Cupar and imprisoned until he was ransomed after the Scottish victory at the Battle of Bannockburn. In 1308 the Warden of Cupar Castle, Sir Thomas Grey, was ambushed on his way back from Edward II's coronation by a follower of Robert Bruce, Walter de Bickerton. Although heavily outnumbered, Thomas routed Bickerton's men through the use of cavalry charges and by deceiving his enemy that they were greater in number than they really were. However, that same year, Cupar Castle was recovered for the Scots by Robert the Bruce.

The forces of the pretender Edward Balliol retook the castle for the English in 1332. In April 1336 the forces of Robert Stewart, then Guardian of the Realm laid siege to Cupar Castle. The following month English forces, led by John de Strivelyn, relieved the English forces occupying the castle breaking the siege. The castle was surrendered by the English constable Sir William Bullock to William Douglas, Lord of Liddesdale in 1339.

The court of the Stewart of Fife sat at the castle until 1425.
