= Nicholas Sutherland, 1st of Duffus =

Scottish noble

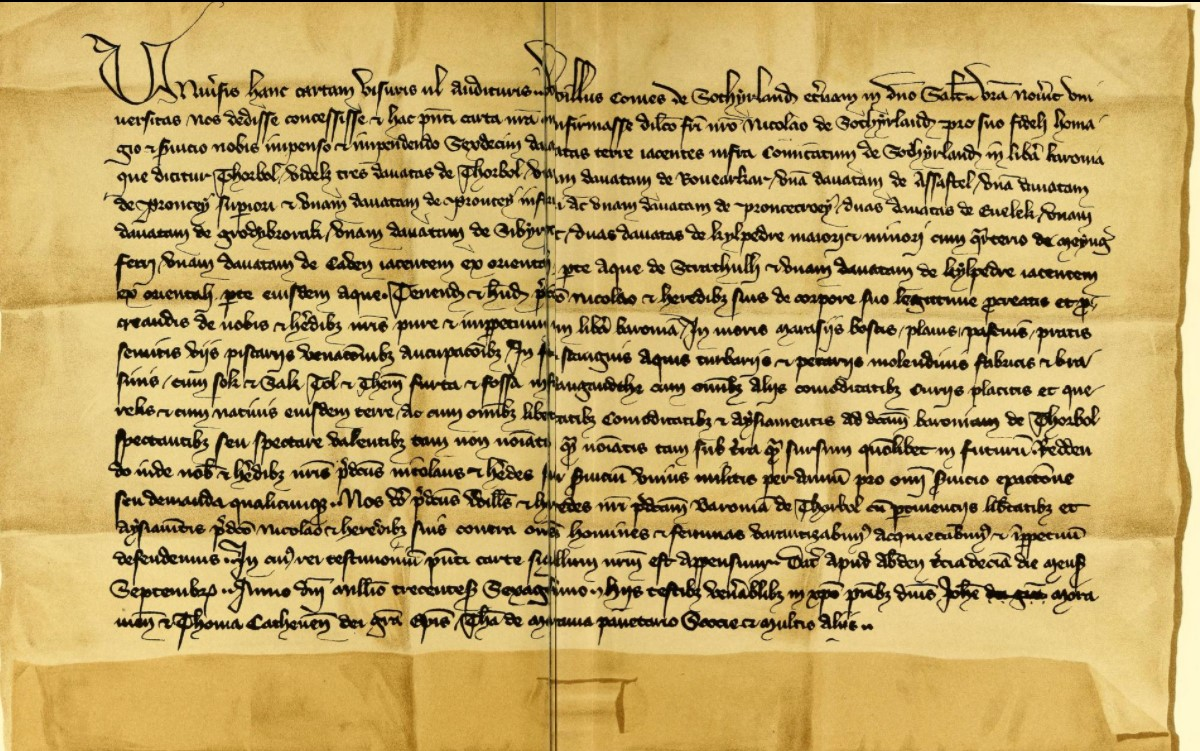
Charter by William de Moravia, 5th Earl of Sutherland to Nicholas Sutherland, his brother, for the barony of Torboll dated 13 September 1360.

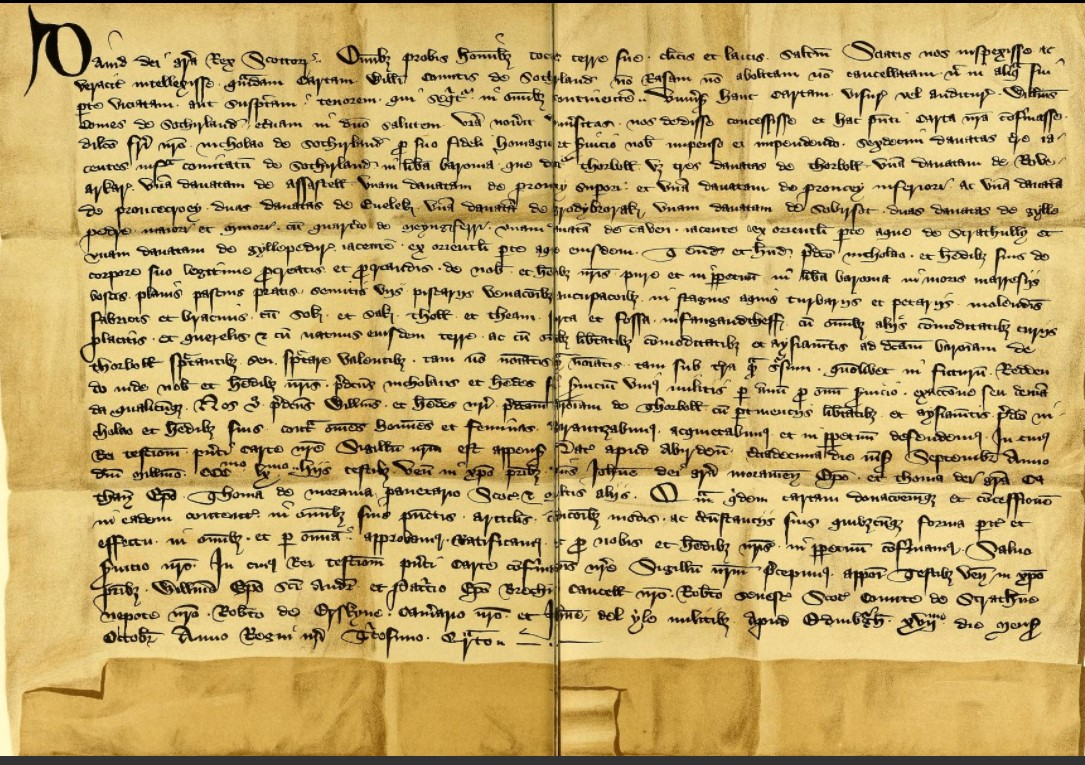
Charter by David II of Scotland confirming charter from the Earl of Sutherland to Nicholas Sutherland dated 17 October 1362.

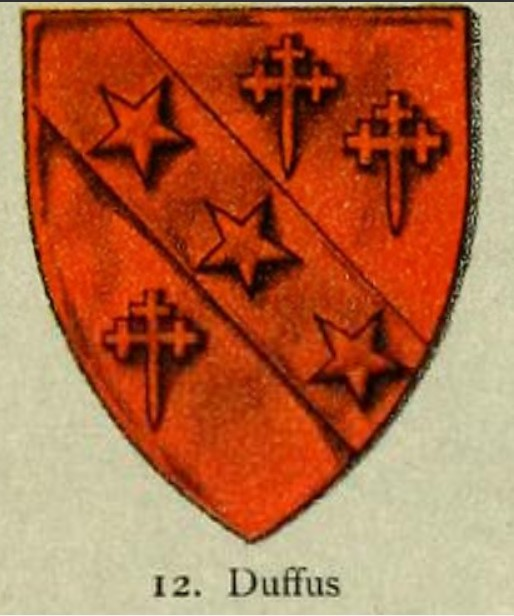
Coat of Arms of Henry Sutherland of Torboll, younger son of Nicholas Sutherland, 1st of Duffus and whose son, Alexander, succeeded to Duffus

Nicholas Sutherland, 1st of Duffus was a Scottish noble who was seated at Duffus Castle, near Elgin, Moray, Scotland in the 14th and 15th centuries.

== History ==
Nicholas Sutherland was the second son of Kenneth de Moravia, 4th Earl of Sutherland, chief of Clan Sutherland. Nicholas married Mary, daughter of Reginald le Chen (died 1345) and in doing so brought the estate of Duffus back to the family of de Moravia, from whom Nicholas was a lineal descendant, and at that time the Earls of Sutherland had not yet given up the surname de Moravia. William de Moravia, 5th Earl of Sutherland confirmed to Nicholas Sutherland, his brother, a charter for the barony of Torboll dated 13 September 1360 and this was subsequently also confirmed by charter from David II of Scotland to Nicholas dated 17 October 1362. Nicholas Sutherland of Duffus is recorded as having murdered Iye Mackay, 4th of Strathnaver and his son Donald Mackay, 5th of Strathnaver, chiefs of Clan Mackay, while they slept at Dingwall Castle, after they had met there to settle a dispute with the Sutherlands peacefully in 1370. Nicolas Sutherland was named as Lord of the Castle of Duffus in 1408.

== Family ==
Nicholas Sutherland married Mary, daughter of Reginald le Chen (died 1345). They had the following two sons:

1. John Sutherland, 2nd of Duffus (1408-1427).
2. Henry Sutherland of Torboll, who received from Robert Sutherland, 6th Earl of Sutherland the £40 lands of Torboll which Nicolas Sutherland had resigned to the earl. Henry Sutherland of Torboll married Margaret Mureff or Moray. Their son was Alexander Sutherland, 3rd of Duffus who succeeded his father in Torboll and his uncle in Duffus.

== See also ==
- Lord Duffus
