= Inverugie =

Village in Aberdeenshire, Scotland

Coordinates: 57.5247°N 1.8306°W

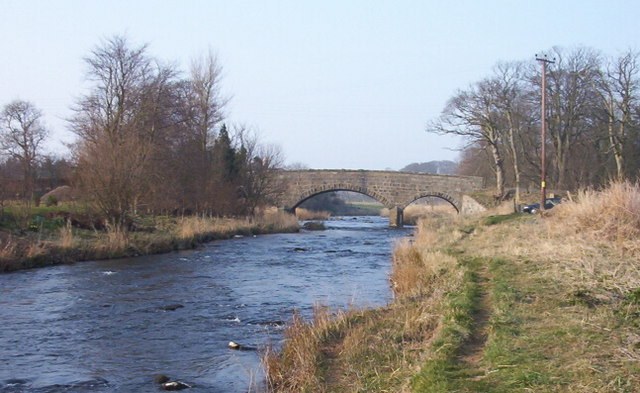
Inverugie Brig across a tributary of the River Ugie

Inverugie (Scottish Gaelic: Inbhir Ùigidh) is a small village in Aberdeenshire, Scotland, to the northwest of Peterhead.

== Sources ==
- Inverugie in the Gazetteer for Scotland
- Historical overview of Inverugie in the Gazetteer for Scotland
