= Reginald le Chen (died 1345) =

Scottish noble (died 1345)

Sir Reginald le Chen of Inverugie and Duffus (died 1345) was a 13th–14th century Scottish noble. He was Baron of Inverugie and Duffus.

Reginald was the son of Sir Reginald le Chen of Inverugie and Mary de Moravia.

He was taken prisoner by the English at the Battle of Dunbar and sent to England, there to remain until his release in 1299. He signed the Declaration of Arbroath in 1320.

== Family ==
Reginald married Helen, daughter of Malise, Earl of Strathearn and Joanna Menteith and had the following issue:

- Mary, married Nicholas Sutherland, 1st of Duffus, son of Kenneth de Moravia, Earl of Sutherland and Marjorie of Mar.
- Mariota, married firstly John Douglas, son of John Douglas of Lothian and secondly John Keith, second son of Sir Edward Keith, 11th Marischal of Scotland and Isabella de Synton.

He died in 1345, his two daughters inheriting the titles and lands between them.
