= Fahan, County Kerry =

Fahan
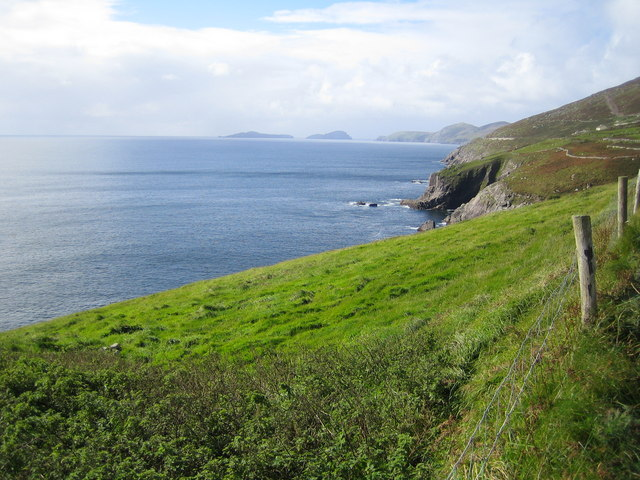
- Fahan: The Dingle Peninsula coastline looking towards Slea Head and the Blasket Islands from the R559 road

- Location within Ireland
- 52.101615°N 10.421519°W
- Location: County Kerry, Ireland

History
- Built: 13th century

Site notes
- Architectural style: clochán

Fahan is an area on the Dingle Peninsula in County Kerry, Ireland, noted for a collection of clochán, or drystone beehive huts. Fahan lies below Mount Eagle on the southern coast of the Dingle peninsula, to the west of the fishing village of Ventry and to the east of the steep cliffs of Slea Head. Fahan has many antiquities, including cave dwellings, stone beehive huts, stone monuments and forts.

== Dunbeg Fort ==
Dunbeg Fort is located on a rocky promontory looking over Dingle Bay to the south. The cliffs have eroded since it was built, and much of the fort has been lost to the sea. The fort's wall cut off access to the triangular promontory, which was later occupied by a single large "beehive" hut. A visitor center at the site includes audiovisual displays, an information and craft room and a restaurant and café. The date at which the Dunbeg fort was built is very uncertain, although its structure resembles other Western Stone Forts. It may have been built around the same time as Iron Age blockhouse forts in Scotland such as the Crosskirk Fort in Caithness and the Clickimin Fort, Ness of Burgi Fort and Huxter Fort in Shetland.

== Clochán ==
The collection of beehive houses at Fahan is said to be the most remarkable in Ireland. The date of the Fahan clochán is uncertain, since stone huts with this design have been built from Neolithic times to the twentieth century. Some of the earliest may have been built by hermit monks. However, it is thought that most of the clochán in this grouping dates to the twelfth century, when Norman invaders forced farmers from more prosperous areas to move to the marginal lands of the Dingle Peninsula. George Victor Du Noyer described the settlement when he visited in 1858. In his view the nearby Dunbeg Fort had been built to protect the community. However, the fort was built before 800 AD, and most likely during the Stone Age before the Christian Era.

Some of the stone huts in the Fahan group lay within stone ring forts. The cashels and clochán formed two clusters, or "cities", of the Fahan group. 460 have been counted, of which 414 are clochán. Most of them appear to be ancient, although some date to the middle of the nineteenth century. Their sizes range from 4 feet (1.2 m) to 22 feet (6.7 m) across, mostly round but sometime D-shaped or oval. They would have had corbelled stone roofs, giving them the shape of beehives.

== Famine cottage ==
The Kavanaugh Famine Cottage is one of Fahan's tourist attractions. Once it had two rooms and a loft. The restored building has three rooms and two outhouses. It contains a selection of furniture and artifacts from the period of the Great Irish Famine. The cottage is on the north side of the R559 road, just west of the car park for Dunbeg Fort.

== Gallery ==
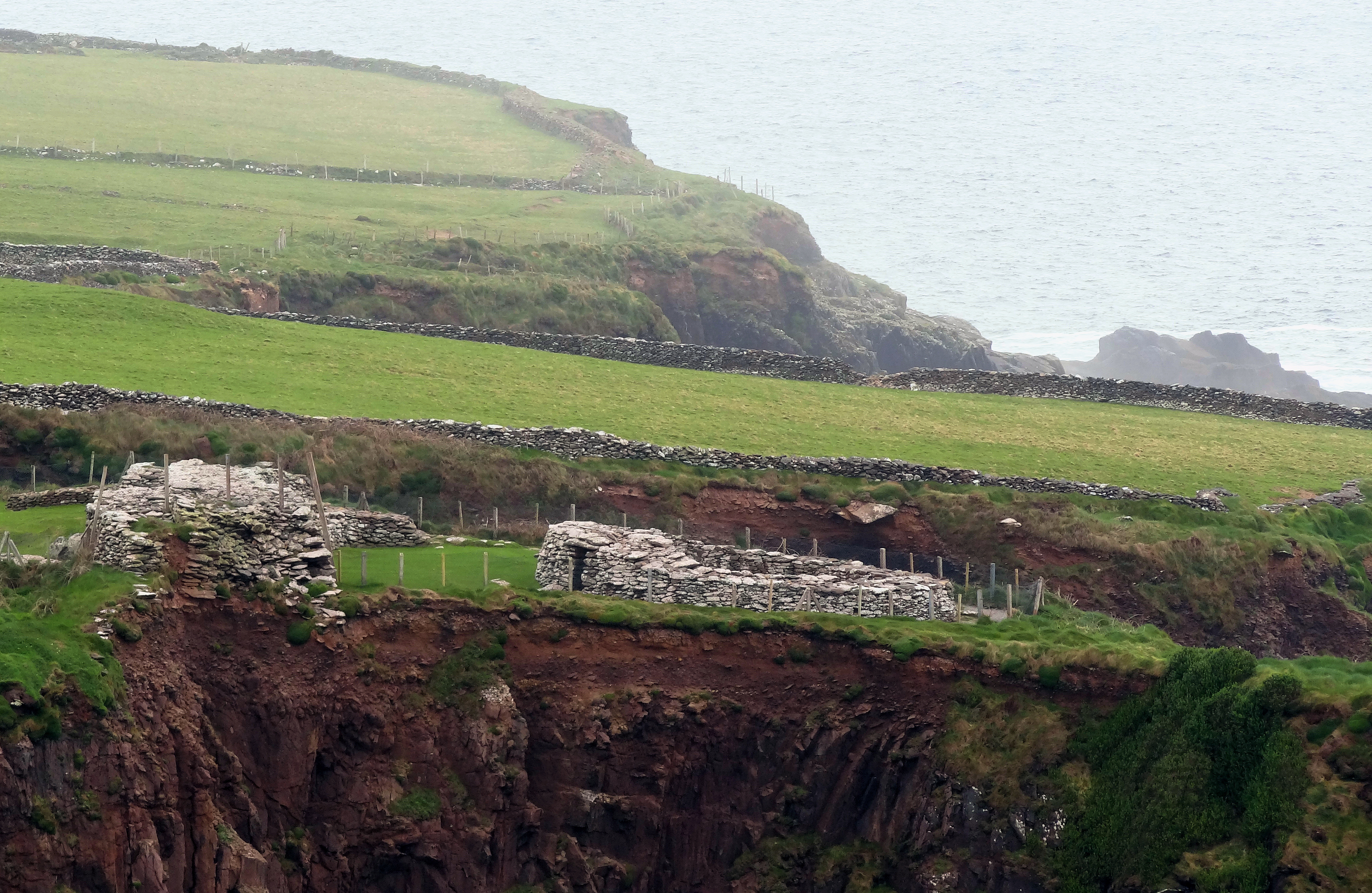
Dunbeg promontory fort

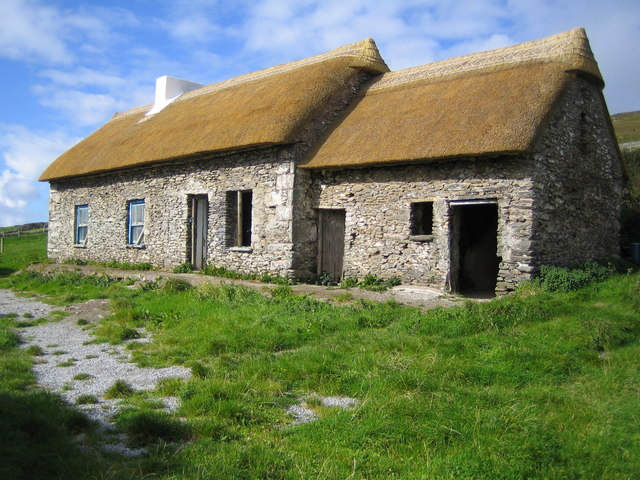
Famine Cottage - a museum of the Famine Years between 1845 and 1853

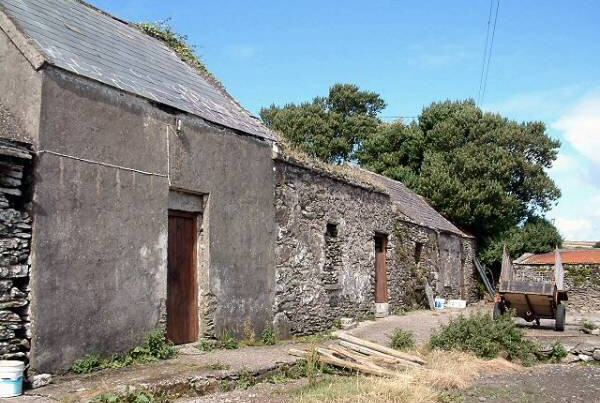
Fahan Farm Buildings

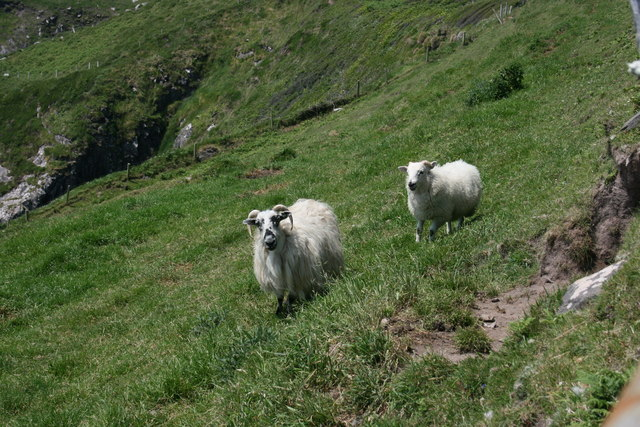
Steep pastures near Fahan

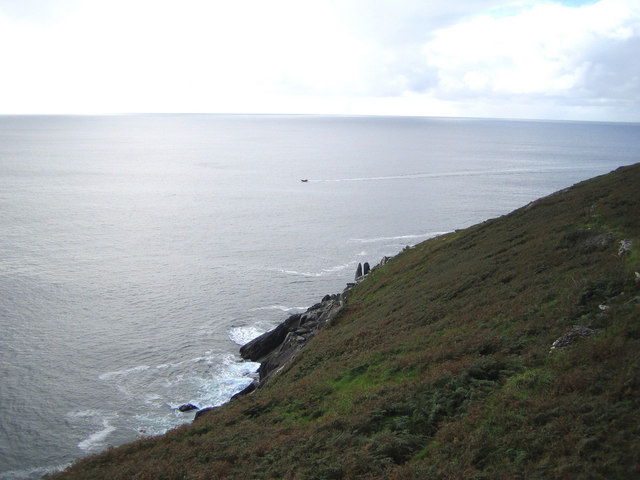
View taken from the R559 road

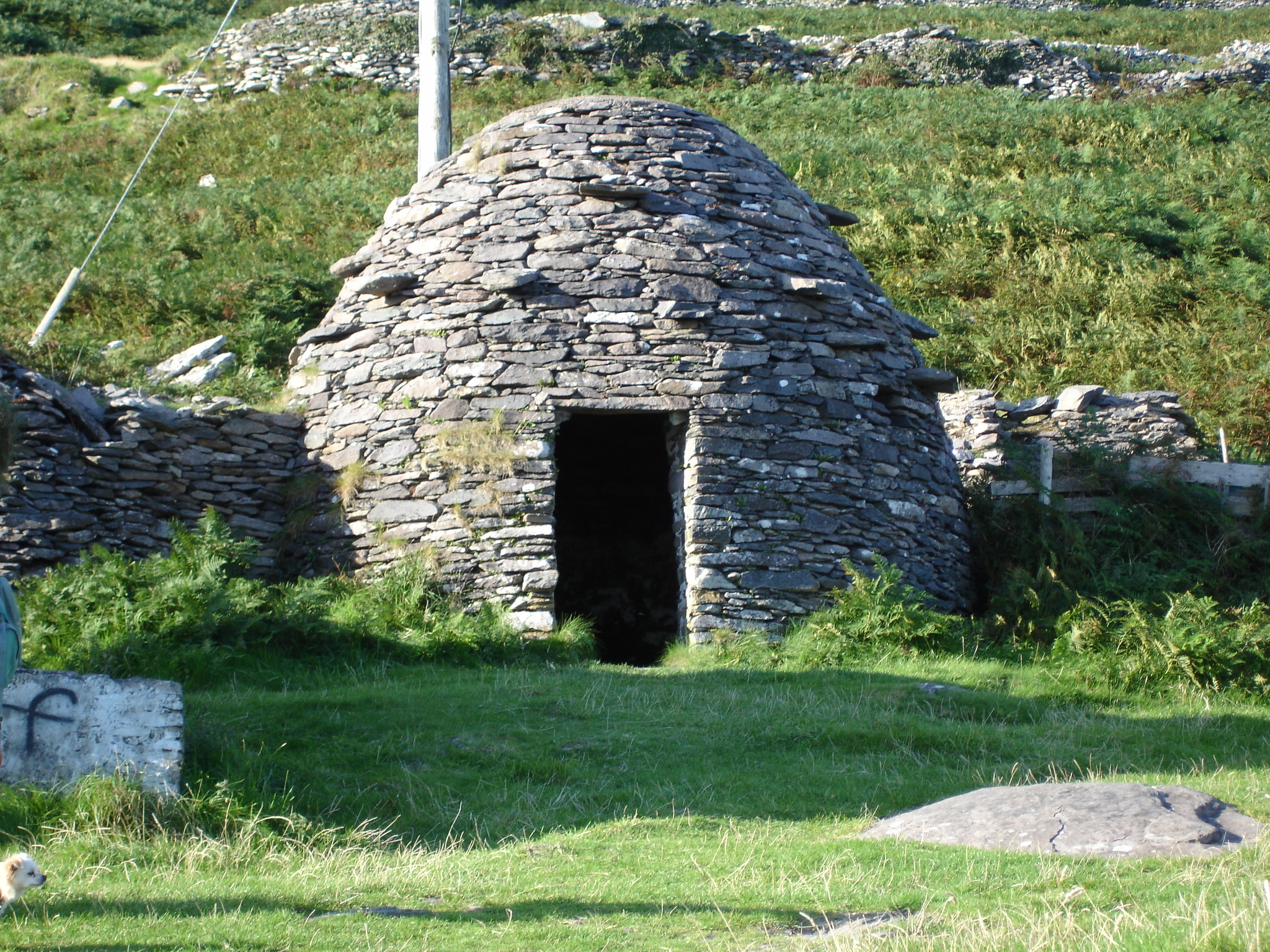
Typical Clochán on the Dingle Peninsula
