= Dunbeg Fort =

- An Dún Beag (Irish)
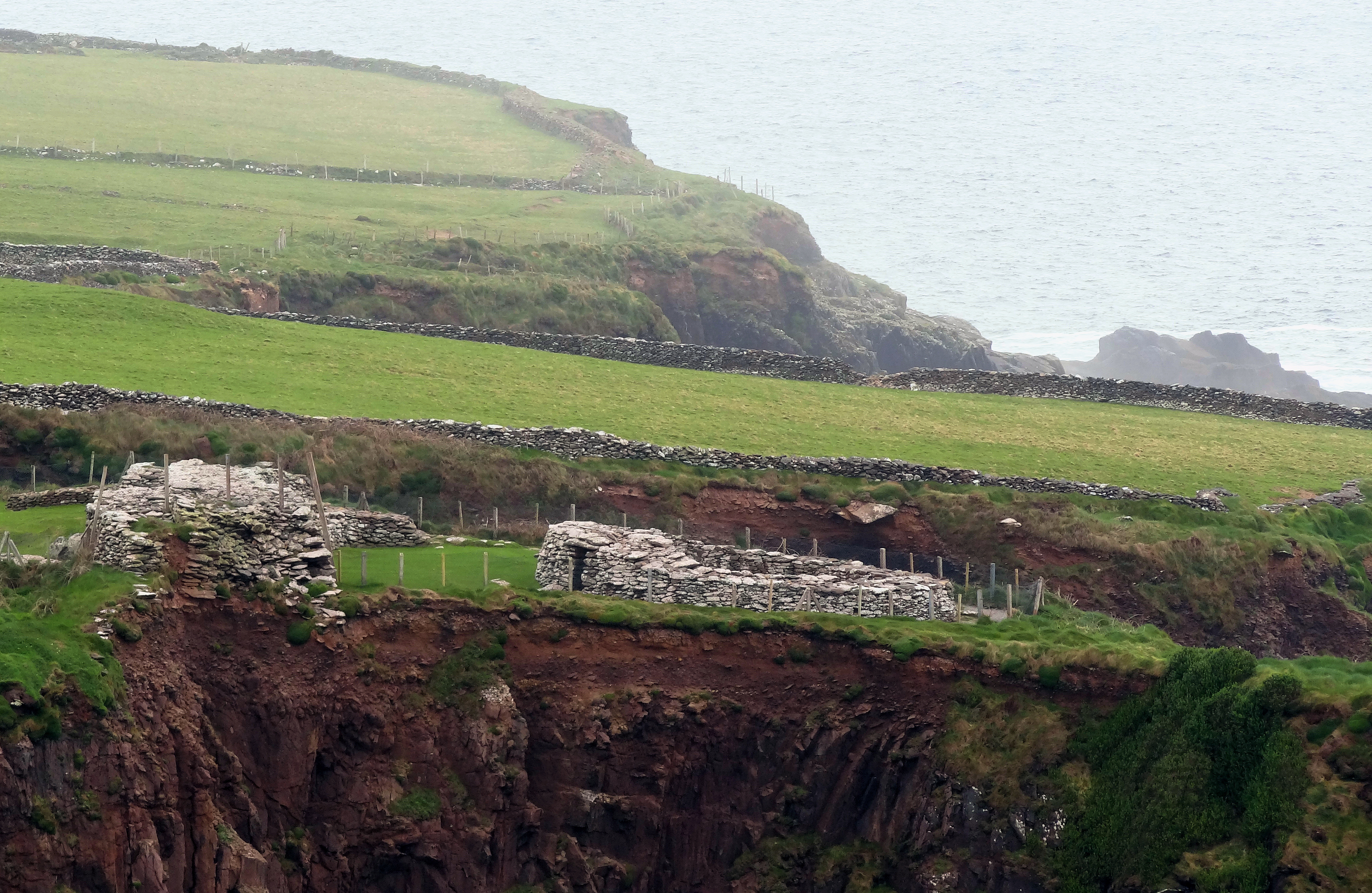
- Dunbeg Fort

- Location within Ireland
- 52.103415°N 10.408551°W
- Location: Fahan, County Kerry, Ireland

History
- Built: Iron Age

Site notes
- Architectural style: Promontory fort

National monument of Ireland
- Reference no.: 177

Dunbeg Fort (Irish: An Dún Beag) is a promontory fort built in the Iron Age near the modern village of Ventry in County Kerry, Ireland.

== Location ==
Dunbeg Fort is located on a rocky promontory just south of Slea Head on the Dingle Peninsula, looking over Dingle Bay to the south and the Atlantic Ocean to the west. The cliffs have eroded since it was built, and much of the fort has been lost to the sea. The fort's wall cut off access to the triangular promontory, which was later occupied by a single large "beehive" hut. Near to the fort there is a group of clocháns, small stone structures also known as beehive huts that seem to have been built around 1000 BC.

A visitor center at the site includes audiovisual displays, an information and craft room and a restaurant and café.

In January 2014 the fort was closed when much of the western wall of the fort fell into the sea due to storm damage. The Office of Public Works and National Monuments Service sent personnel to investigate damage to the site.

The fort was again closed in December 2017 and separately in January 2018 after further damage was inflicted by the season's storms.

Because of its exposed location, the location of Dunbeg Fort makes it vulnerable to natural weather events and the site's existence is threatened. The Office of Public Works has taken mitigating measures to reduce the impact of climate change on this site and protect its architectural, archaeological and natural features.

== Structure ==
George Victor Du Noyer described the fort as it was when he visited in 1858. The fort divided the point of a headland from the main shore with a dry stone wall between 15 and 25 feet (4.6 and 7.6 m) in width and about 200 feet (61 m) long from one side of the headland to the other. A passage near the midpoint leads through the wall, which was then 3.5 feet (1.1 m) high, (Note: After excavations, the floor of the passageway is now lower than in Du Noyer's day.) 2 feet (0.61 m) wide at the top and 3 feet (0.91 m) wide at the base. The lintel is 7 feet (2.1 m) long. The passage widens to 8 feet (2.4 m) inside the fort, with an arched ceiling.

In front of the defensive wall there are four parallel ditches separated by three clay and gravel mounds. A pathway leads through this defence to the entrance of the fort. It seems that originally the path ran through a stone passage with a flagged roof as it passed through each mound. Possibly the earth ramparts were built first, then the rock wall added later to strengthen the defences. The wall itself was at first 8 to 11 feet (2.4 to 3.4 m) thick, with the landward face later built out to as much as 22 feet (6.7 m) near the entrance.

To the right of the entrance passage there is a rectangular room built into the wall. It is about 10 by 6 feet (3.0 by 1.8 m) that can be entered from the passage by a low square opening. A broad bench-like seat is opposite this opening in the passage. To the left of the passage is another, similar room, accessible from the fort through a low square opening, but not accessible from the passage. The wall contains long, narrow passages on either side of the entrance, which would have been covered over. They seem to have been inaccessible, so their purpose is not known. The interior of the wall slopes, forming steps, presumably to give access to a parapet.

Inside the fort Du Noyer found traces of several clocháns, or drystone huts whose layout was no longer clear. There were traces of a wall along the cliff to the west, which is about 90 feet (27 m) above sea level. Two parallel walls ran from the fort up to the slopes of Mount Eagle, separating the lands round the Fahan settlement from the land to the east.

Due to erosion in December 2017 and early 2018 substantial damage has been done to the entrance doorway which has been declared unsafe by the OPW and is closed to visitors.

== Archaeology ==
The date at which the Dunbeg fort was built is very uncertain, although its structure resembles other Western Stone Forts. It may have been built around the same time as Iron Age blockhouse forts in Scotland such as the Crosskirk Fort in Caithness and the Clickimin Fort, Ness of Burgi Fort and Huxter Fort in Shetland. A sample of wood found in a ditch lying partly under the stone wall was dated to around 580 BC, so the wall is no older than that. Another piece of wood in a deposit overlaying the base of a retaining wall was dated to around 800 AD, indicating that the wall was built before that date. There is no trace of occupation other than the drystone clochán within the fort, which was built in the 10th century AD.

== Gallery ==
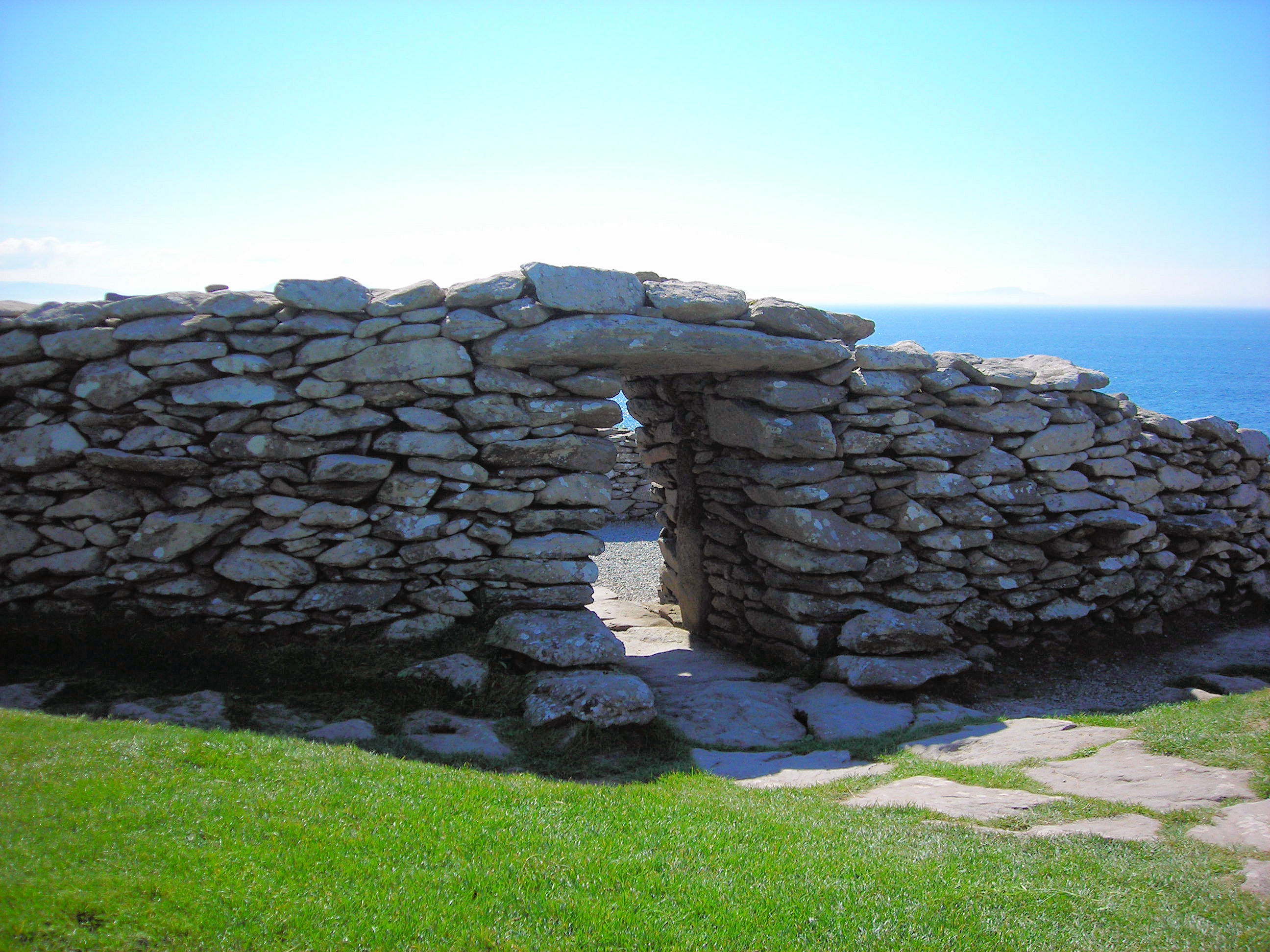

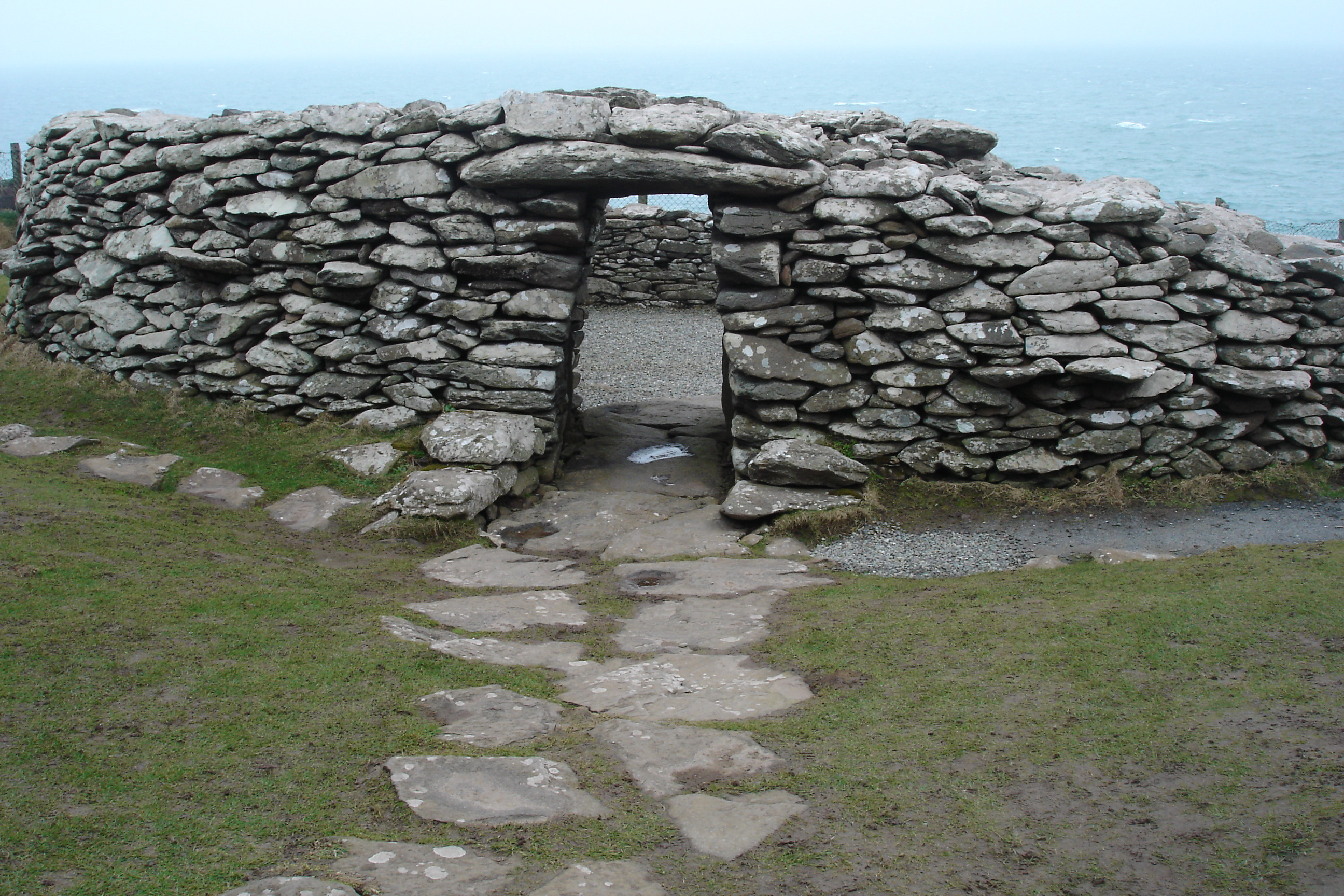

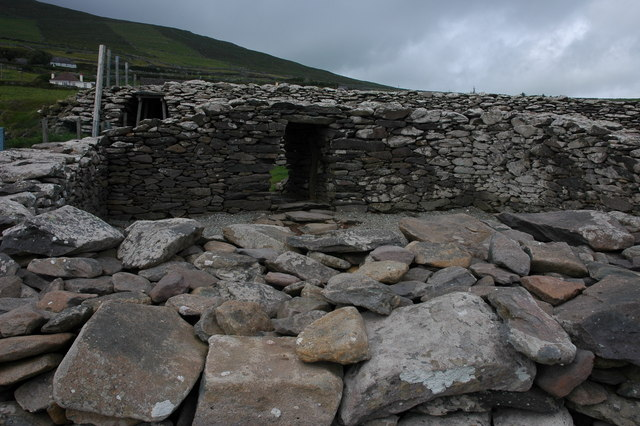

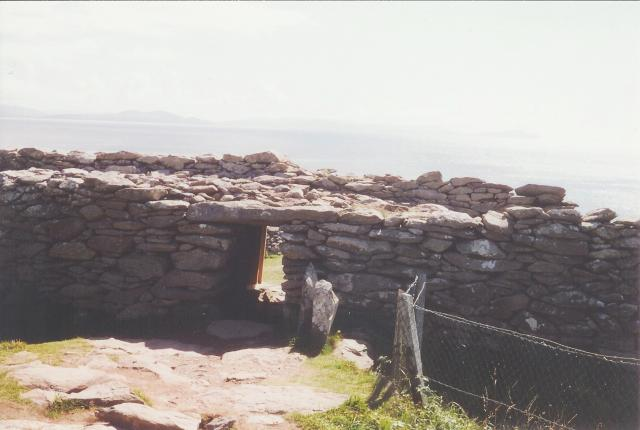

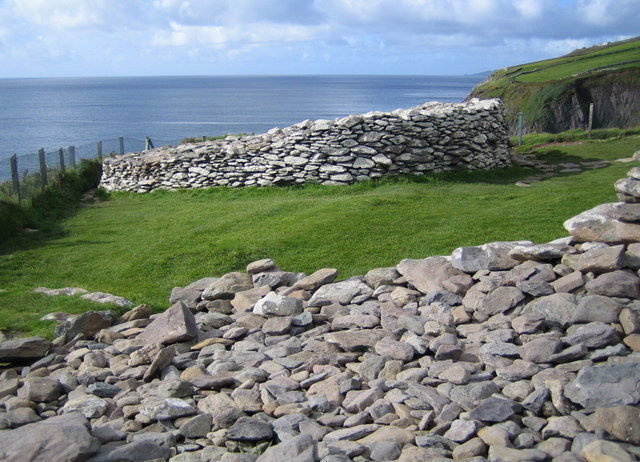
The fence marks the line of the top of the cliffs showing where parts of this promontory fort have fallen into the sea.

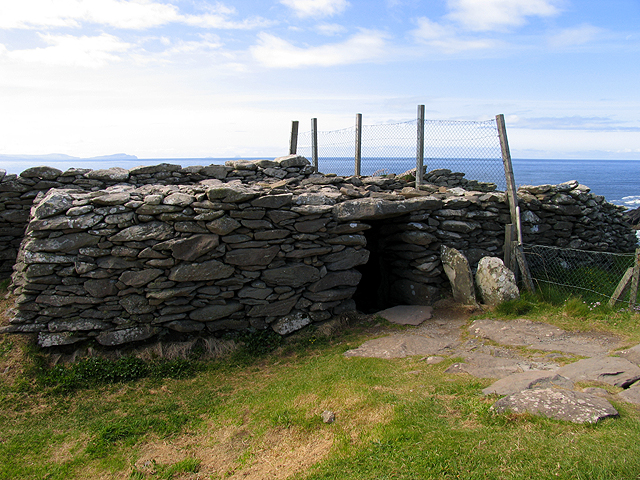

== Notes and references ==
Notes

Citations

Sources

- Albertson, Elizabeth (20 April 2009). Ireland For Dummies. John Wiley & Sons. p. 310. ISBN 978-0-470-46508-0.
- Du Noyer, George V. (1858). "On the remains of ancient stone-built fortresses and habitations occurring to the west of Dingle, County Kerry". The Archaeological Journal. Royal Archaeological Institute.
- Henderson, Jon C. (2007). The Atlantic Iron Age: Settlement and Identity in the First Millennium BC. Psychology Press. p. 186. ISBN 978-0-415-43642-7.
- Kelleher, Suzanne Rowan (12 April 2006). Frommer's Ireland from $90 a Day. John Wiley & Sons. p. 343. ISBN 978-0-471-78941-3.
- "Promontory Forts". The Archaeology of Ireland. Taylor & Francis. 1998. p. 286. GGKEY:RPDUYE54HR0.
- "Welcome to Dún Beag Fort Visitor Centre". Dúnbeag Fort. Archived from the original on 28 September 2007.
