= Westfield, Highland =

Coordinates: 58.55232°N 3.60575°W

Westfield: Scottish Gaelic: an t-Achadh Siar
- Location within the Caithness area
- OS grid reference: ND066638
- Council area: Highland
- Country: Scotland
- Sovereign state: United Kingdom
- Post town: Thurso
- Postcode district: KW14 7
- Police: Scotland
- Fire: Scottish
- Ambulance: Scottish

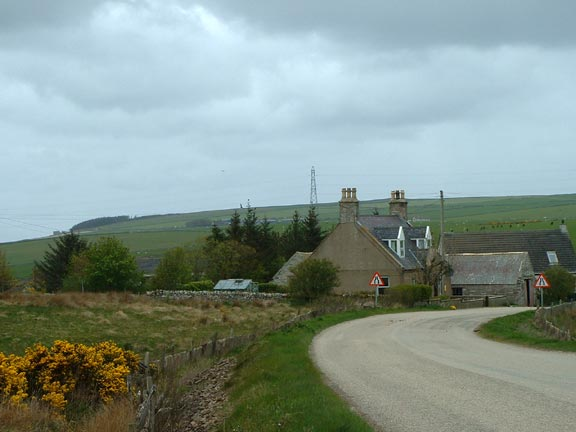
Knockglass, Westfield. Looking down from Knockglass towards the bridge.

Westfield (Scottish Gaelic: An t-Achadh Siar) is a small hamlet, located 3 miles southeast of Thurso, in Caithness, Scottish Highlands and is in the Scottish council area of Highland Amenities in westfield include a scattering of houses, farms, and a shop.

Forss Water passes through Westfield towards Loch Shurrey. Another Branch of the river turns into a small burn and heads towards Loch Lieurary.
