= Huxter =

Coordinates: 60.342°N 0.987°W

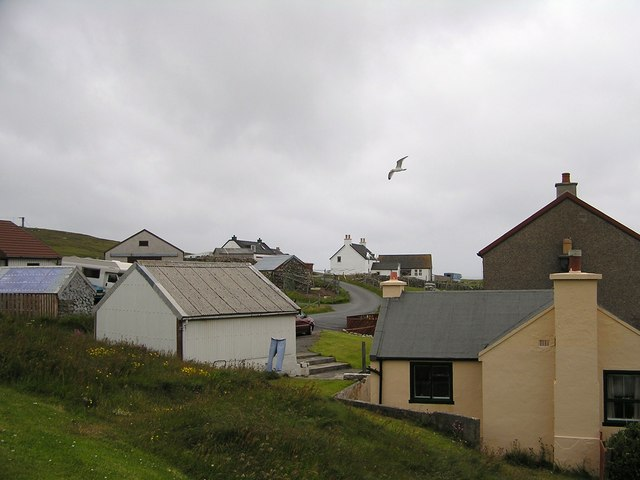
- Huxter, Whalsay

- Location within Shetland
- OS grid reference: HU559623
- Civil parish: Nesting
- Council area: Shetland
- Lieutenancy area: Shetland
- Country: Scotland
- Sovereign state: United Kingdom
- Post town: SHETLAND
- Postcode district: ZE2
- Dialling code: 01806
- Police: Scotland
- Fire: Scottish
- Ambulance: Scottish
- UK Parliament: Orkney and Shetland
- Scottish Parliament: Shetland

Huxter is a crofting township in southeastern Whalsay in the parish of Nesting in the Shetland islands of Scotland.

== Location ==
It lies to the east of Symbister, just north of the Loch of Huxter. Huxter Fort is located in the vicinity, can be reached by foot along a causeway.
