= Forss, Highland =

Hamlet in Caithness, Scotland

Coordinates: 58.58991°N 3.65158°W

Forss: Scottish Gaelic: Fors
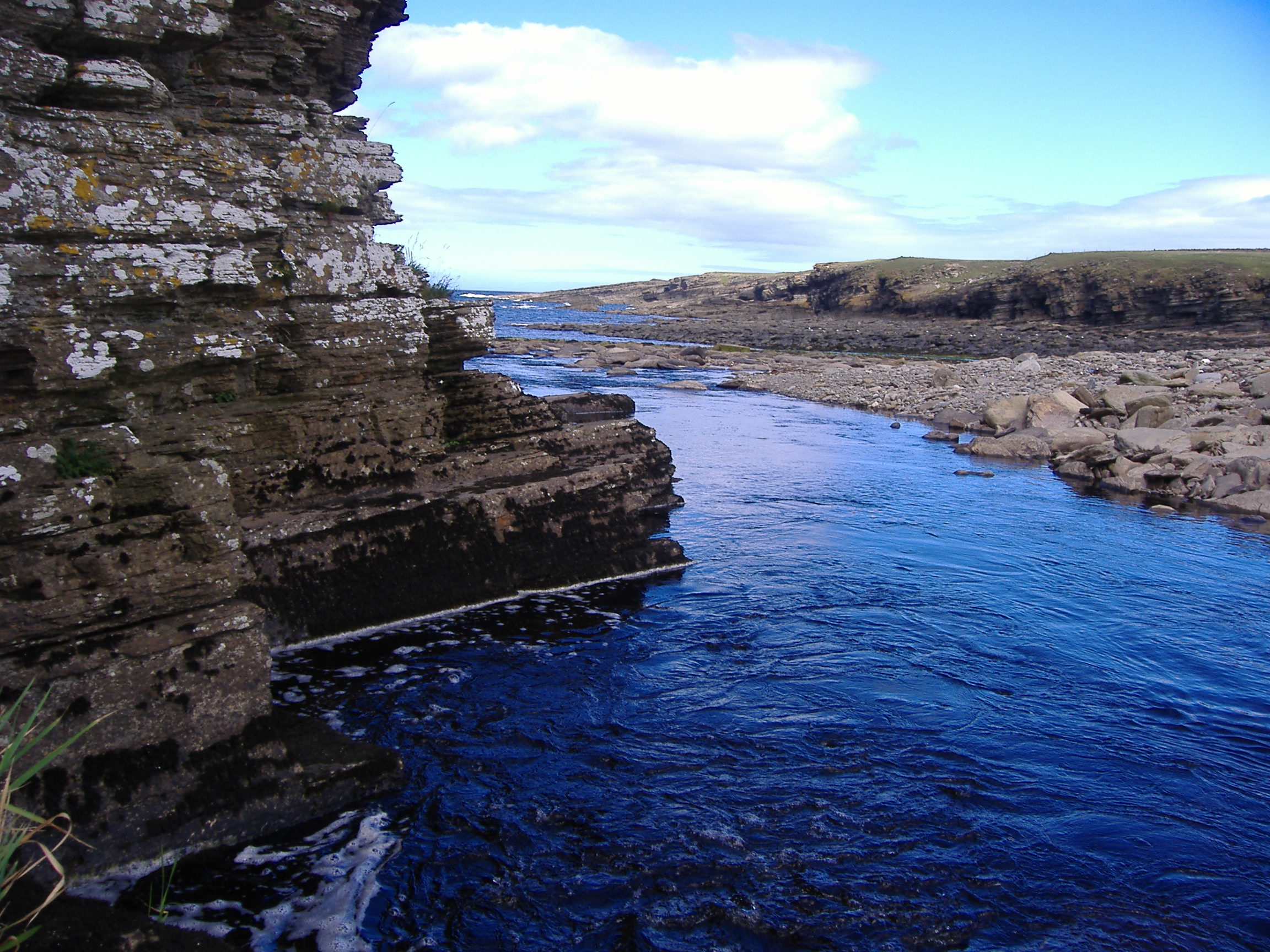
- Forss Water entering the Pentland Firth at Crosskirk Bay.

- Location within the Caithness area
- OS grid reference: ND040680
- Council area: Highland
- Lieutenancy area: Caithness
- Country: Scotland
- Sovereign state: United Kingdom
- Post town: Thurso
- Postcode district: KW14 7
- Police: Scotland
- Fire: Scottish
- Ambulance: Scottish
- UK Parliament: Caithness, Sutherland and Easter Ross
- Scottish Parliament: Caithness, Sutherland and Ross

Forss is a small hamlet, situated 3 miles west of Thurso, in Caithness, Scottish Highlands and is in the Scottish council area of Highland. Brims Castle is located in Forss and was the former stronghold of the Sinclairs of Dunbeath. The ancient 12th century chapel known as St Mary's Chapel is located nearby at Crosskirk.

Forss Water flows through Forss, flowing north to Crosskirk, with the outflow at Crosskirk Bay.

== Gallery ==
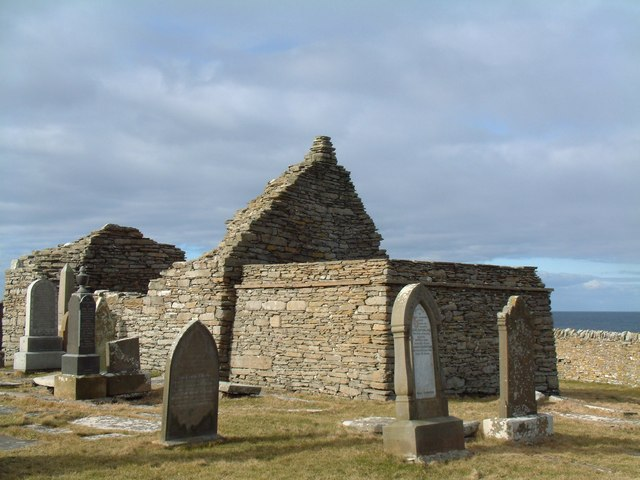
12th century Chapel of St Mary's
