= Neil Mackay, 8th of Strathnaver =

Chief of Scottish Clan Mackay (died 1450)

Neil Mackay, 8th of Strathnaver, was in the 15th century the eighth chief of the ancient Clan Mackay, a Scottish clan of the Scottish Highlands. He is sometimes also recorded as Neil Bass Mackay or Neil Wasse Mackay which was a nickname taken from the fact that for a time he was a prisoner on the Bass Rock.

== Early life and imprisonment ==
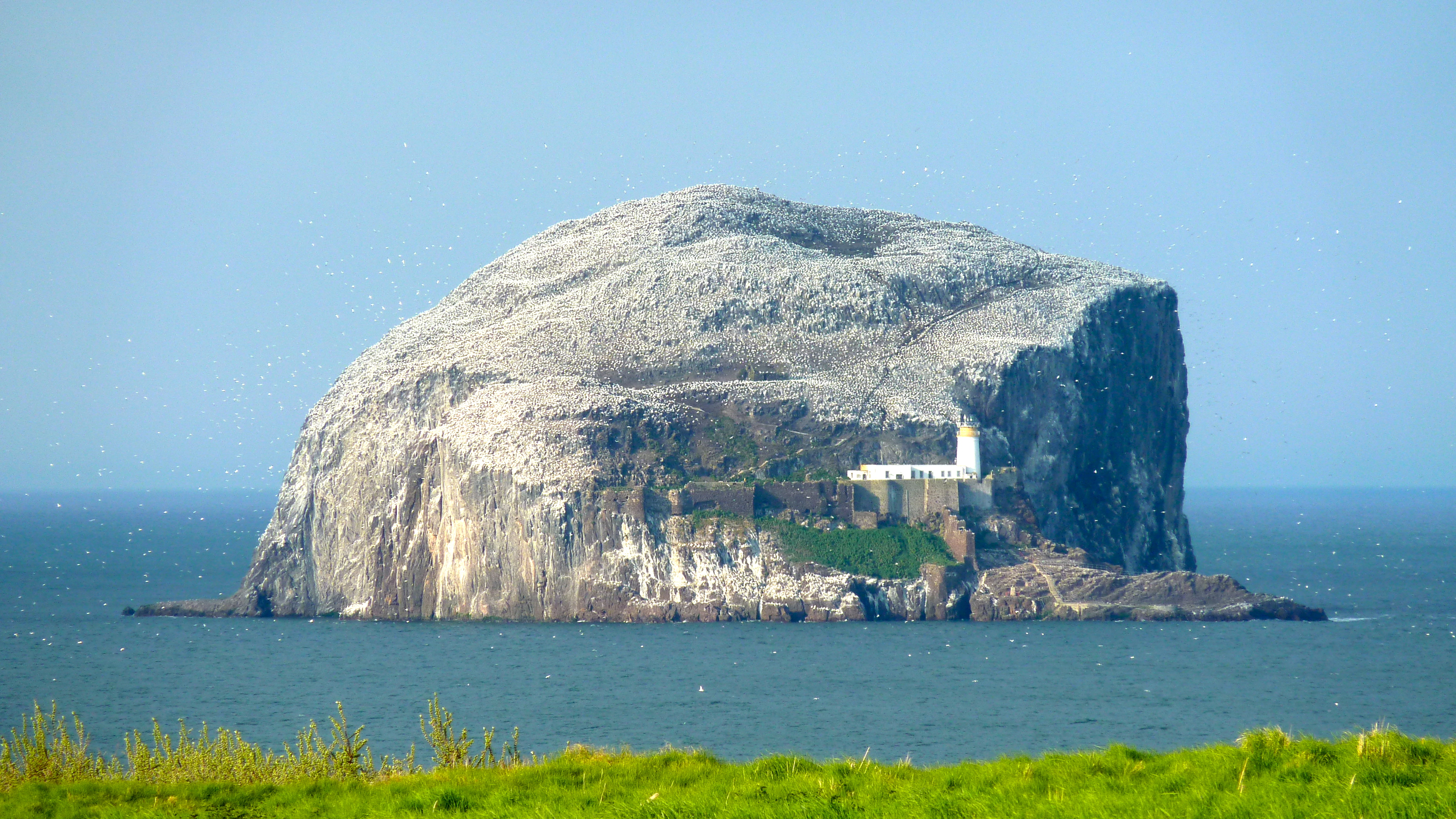
The Bass Rock where Neil Mackay was imprisoned as a hostage after the parliament of 1427 and was afterwards known as Neil Bass Mackay

Neil Mackay, 8th of Strathnaver was the eldest son of Angus Du Mackay, 7th of Strathnaver and his wife Elizabeth, sister of Donald of Islay, Lord of the Isles. In 1427 his father, Angus Du Mackay, was called by James I of Scotland with many other Highland chiefs to a "parliament" at Inverness. The call to a parliament was a ruse and the king had the chiefs arrested, some he killed and some he released. The result was that although Angus Du Mackay was released, his son Neil was kept as a hostage and imprisoned on the Bass Rock. While Neil was kept as a prisoner his father’s cousins, Neil Neilson Mackay and Morgan Neilson Mackay, attempted to take over the Mackay lands of Strathnaver with the support of the Murrays of Aberscross and the Clan Sutherland. However, they were defeated by Angus’s forces who were led by his second son, John Mackay, I of Aberach at the Battle of Drumnacoub in 1433, although Angus was killed.

Neil Mackay remained in captivity for some years until after the king was assassinated and after Neil's father’s death. In the meantime, maintenance of the Mackay interests devolved upon his brother, John Mackay of Aberach.

== Escape from the Bass Rock ==
In 1436, or 1437, King James was murdered at Perth and Neil Mackay escaped from imprisonment on the Bass Rock. This was apparently achieved with help from the wife of the governor, Lauder. John Mackay of Aberach handed over governance of the clan to Neil upon his return and Neil rewarded him with lands in Strathnaver.

In 1437, Neil Mackay having returned home led an expedition into Caithness at the head of his clansmen. This conflict became known as the Sandside Chase in which the Caithness men, believed to have been of the Clan Gunn, were defeated.

== Family ==
According to historian Angus Mackay, writing in 1906, Neil Mackay, 8th of Strahtnaver, married a daughter of George Munro, 10th Baron of Foulis, chief of Clan Munro, and his wife who was a daughter of Ross of Balnagown, chief of Clan Ross. However, according to historian Alexander Mackenzie, writing in 1898, she was the daughter of Hugh Munro, 9th Baron of Foulis and Isabelle Keith, daughter of William Keith, 1st Earl Marischal, also known as the Great Marishchal of Scotland. They had the following children:

1. Angus Roy Mackay, 9th of Strathnaver, who was killed at the Battle of Tarbat in 1486.
2. John Roy Mackay, who had a son called William Roy Mackay.
3. Elizabeth Mackay who married John MacGillion of Lochbuie, chief of the Clan Maclaine of Lochbuie.

== See also ==
- Chiefs of Clan Mackay
- Clan Mackay
