= Loch of Huxter =

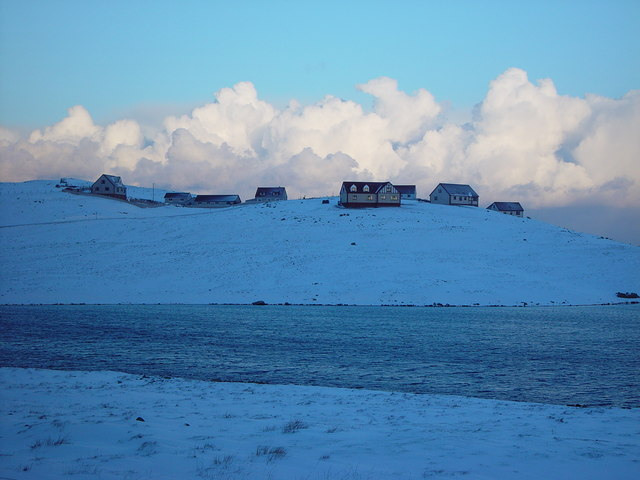
- Huxter and Loch of Huxter in winter

- Location within Scotland
- Location: Whalsay, Shetland Islands, Scotland
- Coordinates: 60.339871°N 0.991285°W
- Type: loch

Loch of Huxter is a loch of southeastern Whalsay, Shetland Islands, Scotland, to the southwest of the village of Huxter. There is a water pumping station on its bank. Huxter Fort is located on an islet to the southeast of the loch, connected by a causeway.
