= Rahinnane Castle =

- Caisleán Ráthanáin (Irish)
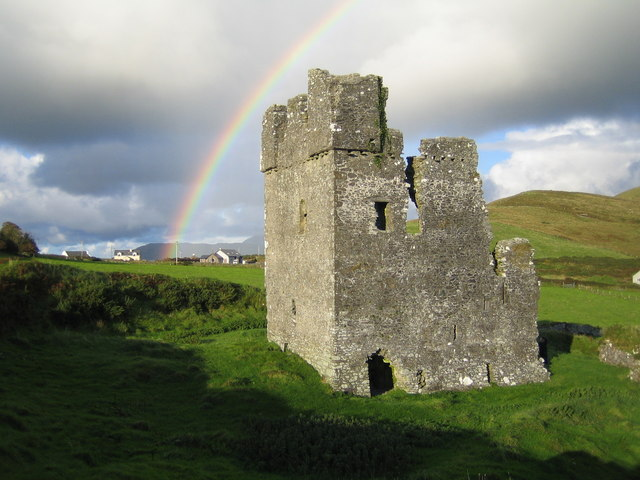

- Location within Ireland
- 52.143050°N 10.383232°W
- Type: tower house atop ringfort
- Location: Rahinnane, Ventry, County Kerry, Ireland

Site notes
- Owner: State

National monument of Ireland
- Official name: Rahinnane Castle, Ringfort & Souterrain
- Reference no.: 10045

Rahinnane Castle is a tower house and National Monument located in County Kerry, Ireland.

== Location ==
Rahinnane Castle is located 1.73 km (1.07 mi) northwest of Ventry, in the west of the Dingle Peninsula.

== History ==
The ringfort on the site was built in the 7th or 8th century AD. The Irish name was originally Rath Fhionnáin — Finan's ringfort.

Local tradition once claimed that this piece of land was the last in Ireland held by the Vikings, as it was so easily defended.

The stone tower house was built in the 15th or 16th century by the FitzGeralds, hereditary Knights of Kerry.

In 1602, towards the end of the Nine Years' War, the castle was taken by Sir Charles Wilmot. It was ruined during the Cromwellian conquest (1649–53).

== Building ==
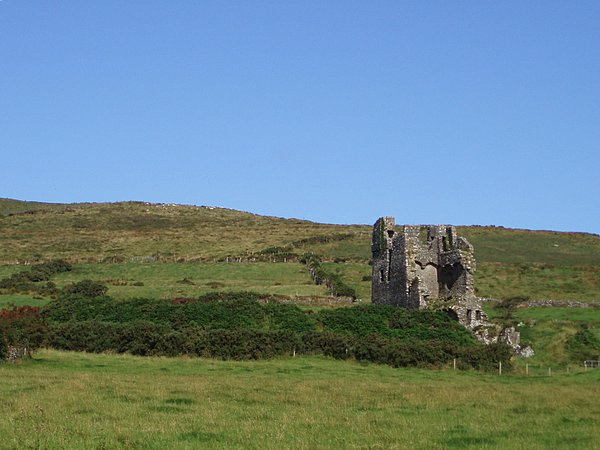
Another view of the castle

The ancient earthwork featured a 9 metres (30 ft) deep ditch, an entrance in the southwest and a souterrain in the southeast. The castle was rectangular and three storeys tall. Most of the outer walls remain; on the inside there is some mural stairway, traces of vaulting and a blind arcade. Two corner turrets are also visible. More than half the outer walls of the three-storey castle remain.
