= Clickimin Loch =

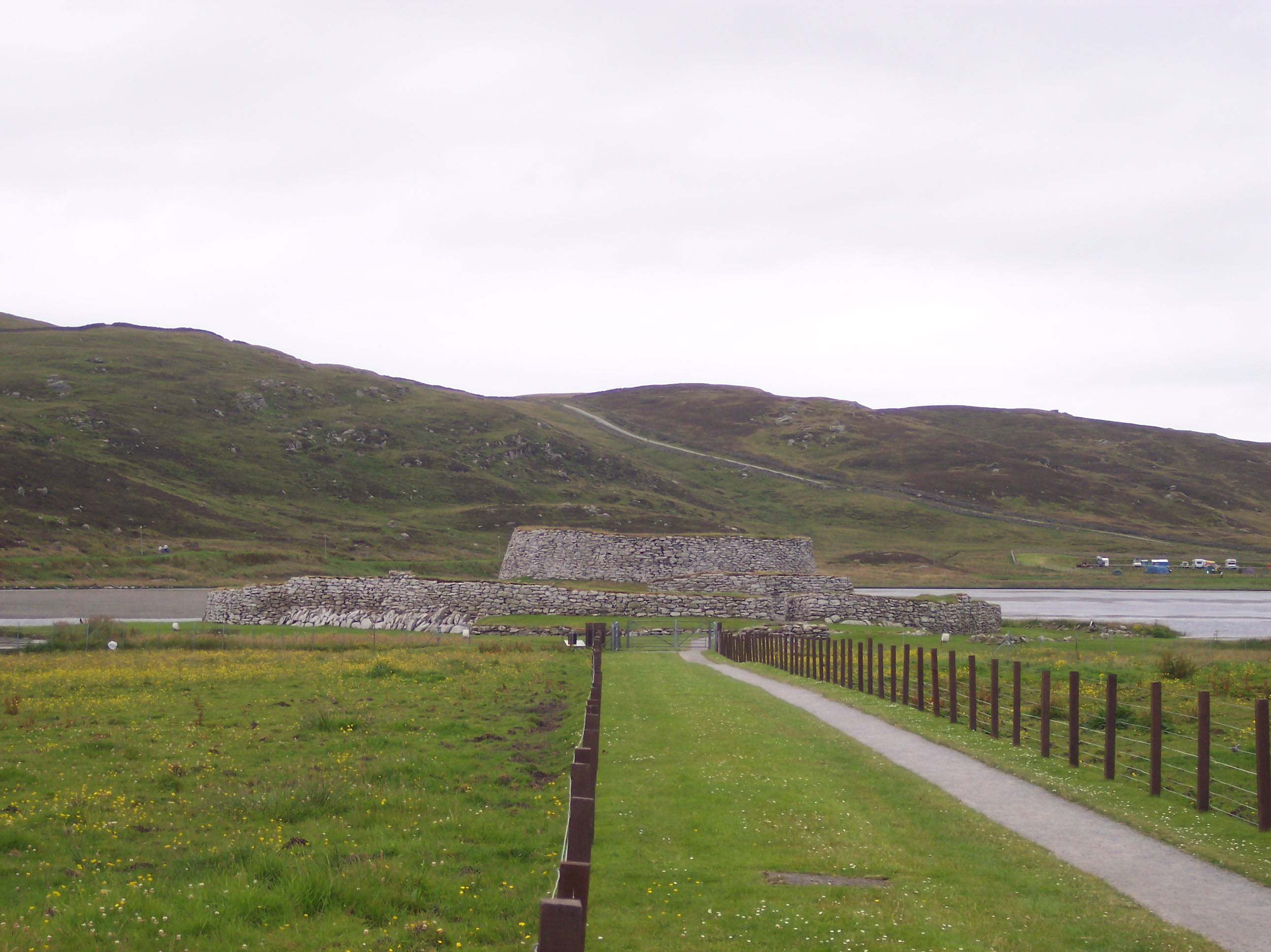
- Clickimin Broch at the loch

- Location within Shetland
- Location: Lerwick, Shetland
- Coordinates: 60.150691°N 1.164894°W
- Type: freshwater loch
- Basin countries: Scotland
- Settlements: Lerwick

Clickimin Loch (/ˌklɪkəmɪn ˈlɔːx/ KLIK-ə-min LOKH) is a loch in Shetland, Scotland, west of Lerwick. A Pictish fort from the 6th century called Clickimin Broch is located on a small islet at the southern end of the loch.

Clickimin Leisure Centre is at the north of the loch.
