= Huxter Fort =

Iron Age fortification in Scotland

- Whalsay, Shetland Islands, Scotland
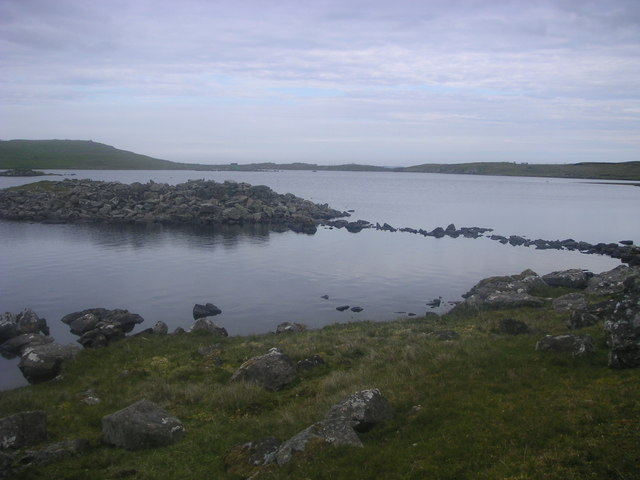
- Connected to the shore by a stone built causeway

Site information
- Condition: Ruined

Location
- Coordinates: 60.338211°N 0.989912°W

Site history
- Built: Iron Age
- Materials: Stone

Huxter Fort is an Iron Age fortification on the island of Whalsay, in the Shetland islands of Scotland, dating to around 300 BC. It is on an islet in the Loch of Huxter, connected to the shore by a causeway.

== Origins ==
The fort was probably built around 300 BC, the generally accepted date of most similar fortifications in the region. It resembles other fortifications such as the Crosskirk Broch, the blockhouse in front of the Broch of Clickimin and the Ness of Burgi fort at Scatness. Presumably these were built by culturally-related people. There are also similarities with stone forts in western Ireland, such as the Dunbeg Fort in County Kerry. (Note: The ring fort or promontory fort design appears to predate construction of brochs. In 1950, B.H. St.John O'Neil presented the view that the brochs were built to defend against Roman slave traders.) This ring fort and blockhouse existed before the other two forts in Whalsay, brochs that were built just before the 1st century AD started.

Huxter was standing until the 19th century. When described in 1879, the fort was much less dilapidated than today.

== Structure ==
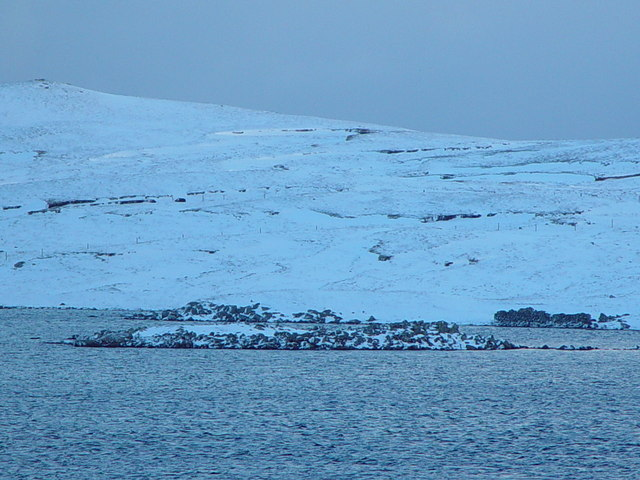
Looking south east across the Loch of Huxter at the remains of the Iron Age Fort situated on an islet in the loch. In the background is the Ward of Hevdafield.

Entry to the fort enclosure was across the causeway, then through a passageway with rooms on either side and with a doorway in the center. The entrance section is part of the main wall. This is similar to the blockhouse at Clickhimin. The passage is just 2.5 feet (0.76 m) wide at its opening, and 3.5 feet (1.1 m) at its inner end. It has been conjectured that there may have been a two-story timber building built against the inner face of the fort. There is little structural evidence for this today. However, early accounts of the fort indicate that this may have been the case, and other forts show traces of what may have been internal stairways.

A ring wall runs around the islet, with a two-room blockhouse forming the defense opposite the causeway. The ring wall seems to have been built separately from the main structure. The blockhouse forms part of the ringwork, but is not bonded into the ring wall. The weaknesses in the defense of this and related structures could be explained by additional defenses of wood and thorn branches that have disappeared without leaving any trace. Another possibility is that the defenses were mainly symbolic, and perhaps played a part in warfare that was conducted according to formal rituals.

== Notes and references ==
Notes

Citations

Sources

- Fairhurst, Horace; Breeze, David John (1984). Excavations at CrossKirk Broch, Caithness. Society Antiquaries Scotland. ISBN 978-0-903903-03-5.
- Hamilton, J. R. C. (April 1956). "Viking Congress, Lerwick, July 1950 (review)". The Antiquaries Journal. 36 (1–2). Cambridge University Press. doi:10.1017/s000358150006073x. S2CID 163609245.
- Harding, Dennis William (2004). The Iron Age in Northern Britain: Celts and Romans, Natives and Invaders. Routledge. p. 148. ISBN 978-0-415-30149-7.
- Henderson, Jon C. (2007). The Atlantic Iron Age: Settlement and Identity in the First Millennium BC. Psychology Press. ISBN 978-0-415-43642-7.
- Ministry of Public Building and Works (1968). Archaeological Reports. H.M. Stationery Office.
- Prehistoric Society (1965). Proceedings of the Prehistoric Society. The Society. p. 102.
- "The Shetland Blockhouse". Proceedings of the Society of Antiquaries of Scotland. Society. 1995.
- Turner, Val (April 1998). Ancient Shetland. B.T. Batsford. p. 66. ISBN 978-0-7134-8001-6.
- "Whalsay A thriving fishing community" (PDF). Heritage.co.
