= Hugh Munro, 9th Baron of Foulis =

Hugh Munro, 9th Baron of Foulis was a 14th – 15th century Scottish soldier and said to be 12th chief of the Clan Munro in the Scottish Highlands. He was seated at Foulis Castle in Ross-shire, Scotland. Although he is traditionally the 9th Baron and 12th overall chief of the clan, he is only the 2nd Munro chief that can be proved by contemporary evidence.

== Lands and Charters ==
Hugh Munro was the eldest son of Robert de Munro, 8th Baron of Foulis (d.1369). Upon his father's death Hugh succeeded as chief of the clan and he was granted from his cousin, Uilleam III, Earl of Ross, charters for the lands of Katewell and the Tower of Badgarvie in the parish of Kiltearn. The following year in 1370 Hugh was granted more lands from the same Earl including Inverlael in Loch Broom, Kilmachalmack in Strath-Oykel, Carbisdale in Strathcarron, lands in the parish of Kincardine, Sutherland and was also reserved the salmon fishing in the Kyle of Oykel for himself and his heirs.

In 1379 Euphemia I, Countess of Ross confirmed the lands of Contullich and the Tower of Ardoch (Contullich Castle) to her cousin Hugh Munro of Foulis and in 1394 she granted Hugh two charters, one in respect of the "Tower of Strathschech" and "Wesstir Fowlys".

== Harlaw and the Lord of the Isles ==
In 1411, Hugh Munro, 9th Baron of Foulis joined Donald of Islay, Lord of the Isles, the chief of Clan Donald, to prosecute his rightful claim to Ross. It was opposed by Robert Stewart, Duke of Albany and his agent and nephew, Alexander Stewart, Earl of Mar. This resulted in the Battle of Harlaw where the Munros fought in the Lord of the Isles 'host' of 10,000 man against a lesser army of armed knights led by the Earl of Mar, agent for the Duke of Albany, who wanted Ross for his son.

== Family ==
Hugh Munro, 9th Baron of Foulis married Isabelle Keith daughter of William Keith, 1st Earl Marischal, also known as the Great Marishchal of Scotland. They had 4 children:

1. George Munro, 10th Baron of Foulis. Hugh's heir and successor as chief of the Clan Munro.
2. John Munro, 1st of Milntown. Progenitor of the Munro of Milntown branch of the clan.
3. Janet Munro. Married Malcolm Og MacKintosh, grandson of Malcolm Beg Mackintosh, 10th of Mackintosh.
4. Elizabeth Munro. Married Neil Mackay, 8th of Strathnaver.

Hugh Munro died in 1425 and was buried at Chanonry. In the years following his death, during the chiefship of his eldest son George Munro, King James I of Scotland returned from captivity in England and took strong measures to restore order in the Highlands. He came to Inverness in 1427 and seized Mariota, Countess of Ross and her son, Alexander of Islay, Lord of the Isles, as well as many other prominent Highlanders who were punished in various ways. Among these no Munros are named. However, there is a "letter of remission", signed under the Great Seal of Scotland and dated 24 August 1428, in which twenty eight named individuals are freed for crimes they had committed in the past and the first five names on the list are all Munros.
