= Sandside Chase =

1437 Scottish clan battle in Caithness

Coordinates: 58°33′48″N 3°47′13″W

Sandside Chase (Battle of Ruoig-Hansett)
- Part of the Scottish clan wars
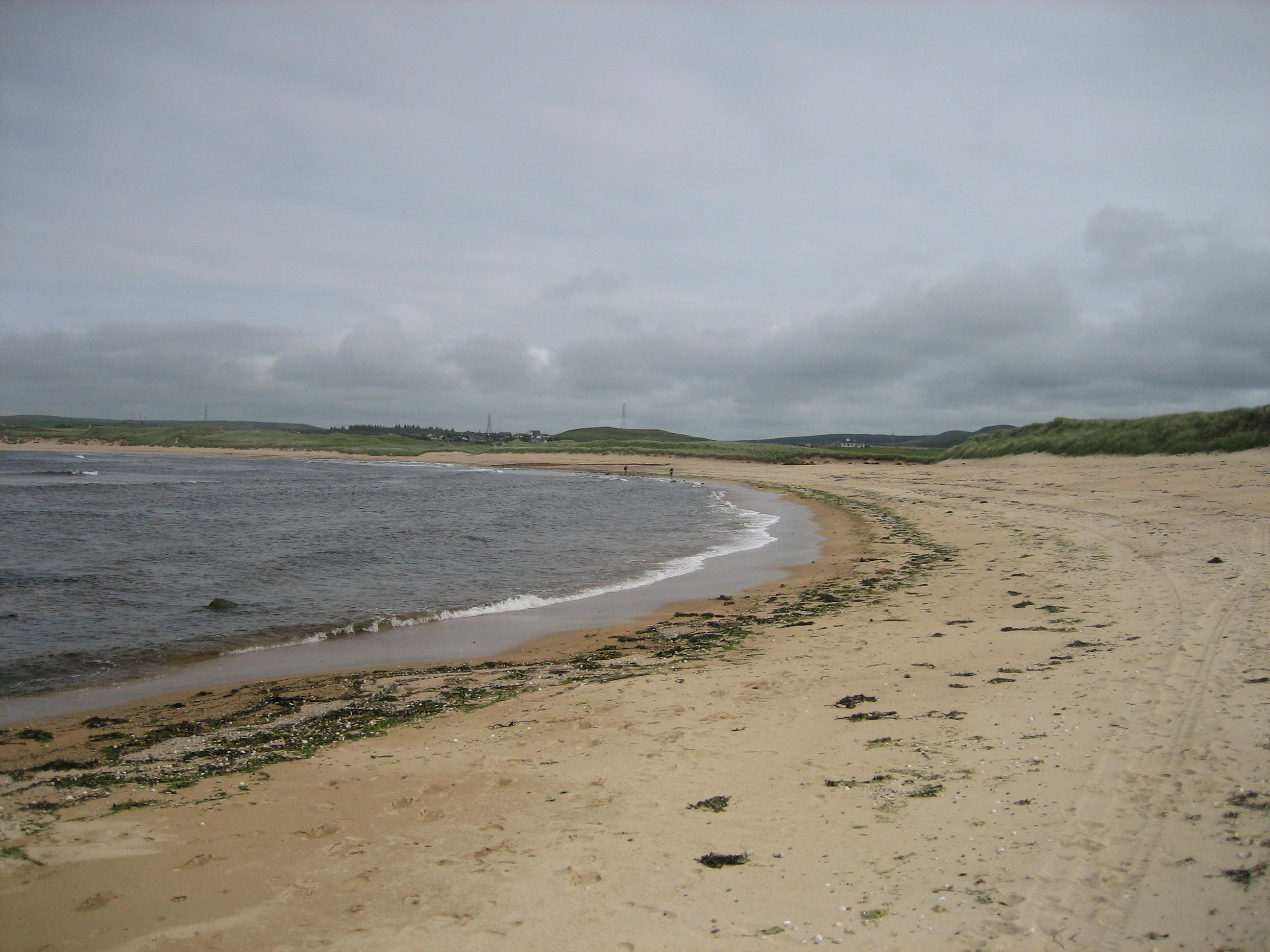
- Sandside Bay
Date	1437
Location	west of Thurso, Caithness grid reference NC950642
Result	Mackay victory

Belligerents
Clan Mackay	Clan Gunn

Commanders and leaders
Neil Mackay, 8th of Strathnaver; John Aberach Mackay	

Strength
Unknown	Unknown

Casualties and losses
Unknown	"Crushing defeat"

The Sandside Chase (The Chase of Sandside, The Chase of Sansett; in Gaelic, Ruoig-Hansett, Ruaig Handside or Ruaig-Shansaid) was a Scottish clan battle which took place in 1437 in Caithness, about 6 miles (9.7 km) west of Thurso. The Clan Mackay launched a raid from Strathnaver towards Thurso until they encountered resistance from the locals at Dounreay. The Mackays then pulled back to Sandside, where they were joined by reinforcements and slaughtered the defenders on the coast north of Reay.

== Background ==
Neil Mackay, 8th of Strathnaver, son of Angus Du Mackay, 7th of Strathnaver, chief of Clan Mackay had been imprisoned on the Bass Rock by King James I of Scotland in 1427 for his part in the Battle of Harpsdale, which took place in 1426. Neil Wasse Mackay was released from the Bass Rock in 1436 and the following year raided Caithness in a repeat of the Battle of Harpsdale eleven years before.

== Battle ==
The Mackays met the Caithness men at Dounreay (grid reference ND006658) and pushed them to the Forss Water before Caithness reinforcements made them retreat to Sandside (grid reference NC950642). There they were joined by the Mackay forces that had been posted on Drum Hollistan to protect their rear. Ian Aberach manoeuvred his opponents into a loop of the bay below Sandside House and slaughtered them around the ancient fort of Cnoc Stangar. The survivors were chased back to Dounreay.

A row of some 60 stones still standing at grid reference ND007660 in 1915 were said to mark the graves of some of those killed in the battle, but they had disappeared by 1964.

== Accounts of the Battle ==
=== Conflicts of the Clans ===
An account of the battle was written in the book Conflicts of the Clans which was published by the Foulis press in 1764 and which was written from Sir Robert Gordon's manuscript which was written in the time of King James VI of Scotland (1566 - 1625):

The year of god 1437, Neil Wasse Mackay, after his release out of the Bass, entered Caithness with all hostility, and spoiled all that country. He skirmished with some of the inhabitants of that province at a place called Sanset, where he overthrew them with slaughter on either side. This conflict was called Ruaig-hanset, that is the Chase at Sanset. Shortly thereafter Neil Wasse died.

=== Sir Robert Gordon ===
Sir Robert Gordon's (1580–1656) manuscript was published in 1813 and has an account of the battle as follows:

Neil- wasse-MacKay, immediately after his release out of the Bass, the year 1437, entered into Caithness, and spoiled the country. He skirmished with some of the people of the country, at a place called Sansett, where he overthrew them, with slaughter on either side. This conflict was called Ruoig-Hansett, that is, the flight or chase at Sansett. After which Neil-Wasse died, leaving two sons, Angus and John-Roy. Of this John-Roy, the Sleaght-ean-Roy (offspring of John-Roy) are descended.

=== Robert Mackay ===
A traditional account of the battle was written by Robert Mackay in his book the History of the House and Clan of the Name Mackay, published in 1829:

The tradition regarding this invasion, is to the following effect: The people of Caithness had committed some depredations on the east parts of the Reay country, in return for which, he and his brother John-Abrach with their men, marched into Caithness, and took a great spoil with them. The better to provide against an assault, they placed a reserve about the border beyond Drimholisten, (Prospect-hill) to be ready to assist, if necessary. Neil and John were overtaken by a great company of Caithness-men at Downreay, when a fierce conflict ensued; but at length the latter fled, and were pursued with slaughter about four miles to the water of Forss, where Niel and John saw a fresh company marching with speed down the hill of Forss, to assist their flying countrymen. The MacKays then retired back as far as Sanside, before their opponents got up with them, and by that time they were joined by their reserve. A most desperate engagement followed, which terminated in the defeat and flight of the Caithness-men, who were pursued with considerable slaughter as far as Downreay, about three miles. It is to this day called Ruoig Haundsaid, i.e., the Sandside Chace.
