= Forss Water =

River in Scotland

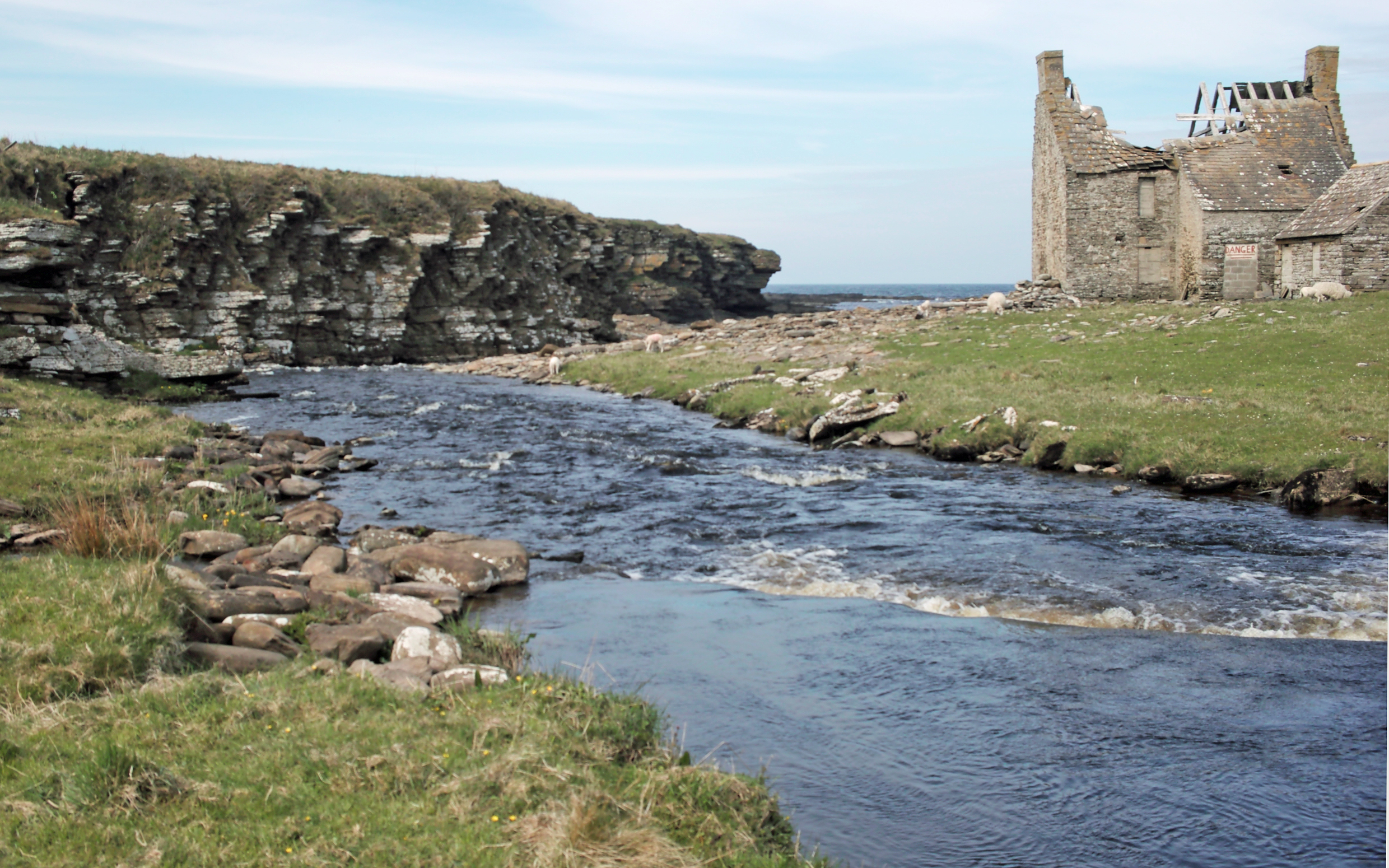

Forss Water, known also as Forss River, has its source at the northern end of Loch Shurrey, at grid reference ND042568. About 13 kilometres north of its source the river flows into Crosskirk Bay and the Atlantic Ocean at ND029700. Crosskirk Bay is on the north coast of Great Britain and about 8 kilometres west of the burgh of Thurso, Caithness, in Highland, Scotland. The river marked the eastern extent of the Clan Mackay raid in the Sandside Chase of 1437.

== Tributaries ==
- Alt Torigil, known also as Alt Forsiescye, enters the river at ND037591.
- Alltan Guinne enters at ND058638.
- The Burn of Baillie enters at ND050653.
- The Burn of Brimside enters at ND045669.

== Bridges ==
The river is crossed by four road bridges and one footbridge.

The road bridges are:

- Near the river's source at Loch Shurrey, at ND042568.
- Near Broubster Village, at ND036601.
- Near Westfield, at ND055642.
- Near Lythmore, at ND047662.
- The Bridge of Forss, which carries the A836 road at ND037687. The A836 leads towards Thurso and John o' Groats in the east and towards Reay, Melvich, Bettyhill and Tongue in the west.

The footbridge is near the river's mouth at ND029700, providing access to St Marys Chapel, to the west of the river, from Crosskirk, to the east.
