= Loch Shurrery =

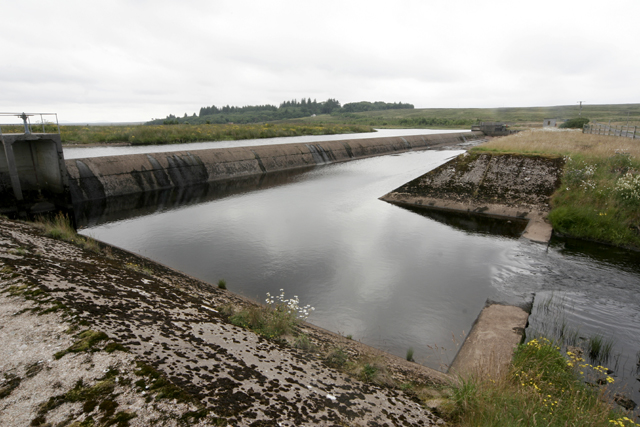
- Dam at the head of Loch Shurrery

- Location within Highland
- Location: Caithness, Highland, Scotland
- Coordinates: 58.477600°N 3.640100°W
- Type: freshwater loch
- Primary inflows: Torran Water
- Primary outflows: Forss Water
- Basin countries: Scotland
- Max. length: 1.25 mi (2.01 km)
- Max. width: 0.5 mi (0.80 km)
- Surface area: 99.4 ha (246 acres)
- Average depth: 4.5 ft (1.4 m)
- Max. depth: 7 ft (2.1 m)
- Water volume: 43,000,000 ft^{3} (1,200,000 m^{3})
- Shore length^{1}: 7.4 km (4.6 mi)
- Surface elevation: 94 m (308 ft)
- Islands: 1
- ^{1} Shore length is not a well-defined measure.

Loch Shurrery (also known as Loch Shurrey) is a small, shallow, lowland freshwater loch lying approximately 8 mi (13 km) south west of Thurso in the Scottish Highlands. The loch has a somewhat elliptical shape with a perimeter of 7.4 km (4.6 mi). It is approximately 1.25 mi (2.01 km) long, has an average depth of 4.5 ft (1.4 m) and is 7 ft (2.1 m) at its deepest. The loch was surveyed on 6 October 1902 by John Parsons and T.R.H. Garrett and later charted as part of Sir John Murray's Bathymetrical Survey of Fresh-Water Lochs of Scotland 1897-1909. A dam lies to the north end of the loch.

Approximately 200 yards (180 m) from the northern end of the loch are the archaeological remains of an Iron Age hut circle with a medium-sized oval house. Some pottery was found at the site. At the southern end of the loch is Lambsdale Leans, a cairn with possible cist or chamber. Two Viking graves lie nearby.

The loch is used for fishing and the Dounreay Fly Fishing Association keeps a boat on the loch for members and visitors.
