= George Munro, 10th Baron of Foulis =

George Munro of Foulis (died 1452) is traditionally the 10th Baron and 13th-successive chief of the Clan Munro; however, he is only the third-successive chief of the clan who can be proved by contemporary evidence. He was the eldest son of Hugh Munro, 9th Baron of Foulis, and was seated at Foulis Castle.

== Lands and Charters ==
According to 19th-century historian Alexander Mackenzie, George Munro of Foulis was on 17 October 1410, before Hugh Fraser, 1st Lord Lovat, the Sheriff of Inverness, served heir to his mother, Isobel Keith, in the lands of Lissera, Borrowston and Lybster in Caithness. These lands being disponed by his maternal grandmother, the Lady Mariotta Cheyne as one of the co-heiresses of her father Sir Reginald Cheyne of Inverugie. Mackenzie also states that George Munro of Foulis obtained a charter under the Great Seal of king James I of Scotland dated at St Andrews on 22 July 1426, in which he had confirmed to him the land and baronies of Easter and Wester Fowlis (Foulis), Katewell, Contullich, Dann, Carbisdale, Inverlael, Findon and others. Mackenzie also states that George Munro of Foulis is recorded on charters of the years 1437, 1438, 1439, 1440 and 1449. 20th-century historian RW Munro does not deny these charters but does say that the evidence for them is "lacking"; however, he does confirm that George Munro is on record in 1437 and 1449.

== Battle of Bealach nam Broig ==
It was during George Munro of Foulis's chiefship that a rising took place in 1452 by a group of clans from Kinlochewe who were septs and supporters of the Clan Mackenzie, whose chief was Alexander Mackenzie of Kintail. The Kinlochewe clans took hostage the nephew of the Earl of Ross. The Munros and Dingwalls in response pursued the rising clans and the Battle of Bealach nam Broig took place in which the Kinlochewe clans of the MacIvers, MacAulays and MacLeays were almost utterly extinguished and the Munros and Dingwalls won a hollow victory: though the Earl's nephew had been rescued, they had lost a great number of men. George is believed to have been killed at the Battle of Bealach nam Broig in 1452 and this is likely as it is confirmed by records that he was dead by 1453.

John of Islay, Earl of Ross, who was also the Lord of the Isles had supported the Earl of Douglas in rebellion against the king. George Eyre-Todd, writing in 1923, stated that George Munro of Foulis was killed during the wars of the Isles and Douglases, the Battle of Brechin having been fought by supporters of the Douglases in 1452, which was the same year that the Battle of Bealach nam Broig took place, but Eyre-Todd gives the year of Munro's death as 1454.

== Family and descendants ==
George Munro of Foulis married twice. His first marriage was to Isobella Ross, daughter of the chief of the Clan Ross of Balnagown Castle. Different sources mention the child they had. Mackenzie states that George Munro and Isobella's only son was another George Munro said to have been killed with his father at the Battle of Bealach nam Broig in 1452. However the Munro Tree of 1734 states that their child was called William Munro. Mackenzie states that William Munro was born from George's second marriage and that he is recorded in a document from 1499.

George Munro married secondly a daughter of MacCulloch of Plaids. They had two sons:

1. John Munro, 11th Baron of Foulis (heir and successor).
2. Hugh Munro, 1st of Coul and later of Balconie. The clergyman and writer Donald Monro, Dean of the Isles, was his grandson. Other notable descendants included Sir Thomas Munro, 1st Baronet (of Linderits), and William Munroe, who became a landowner in the United States and his brother, Benedict Munro, Baron von Meikeldorf a German Baron.
