= Crosskirk =

Hamlet in Caithness, Scotland

Coordinates: 58.60605°N 3.66841°W

Crosskirk: Scots: Crosskirk
- Location within the Caithness area
- OS grid reference: ND031698
- Council area: Highland
- Country: Scotland
- Sovereign state: United Kingdom
- Post town: Forss
- Postcode district: KW14 7
- Police: Scotland
- Fire: Scottish
- Ambulance: Scottish
- UK Parliament: Caithness, Sutherland and Easter Ross
- Scottish Parliament: Caithness, Sutherland and Ross

Crosskirk is a small remote hamlet, overlooking Crosskirk Bay, in Caithness, Scottish Highlands and is in the Scottish council area of Highland.

The hamlet of Crosskirk is situated less than 1 mile north east of Forss and 3 miles west of Thurso. The ancient Crosskirk Broch fortification used to stand on a promontory near the hamlet, but has been eroded into the sea.
