= Ventry =

Seaside village in County Kerry, Ireland

Ventry / Ceann Trá Fionntrá
- Village
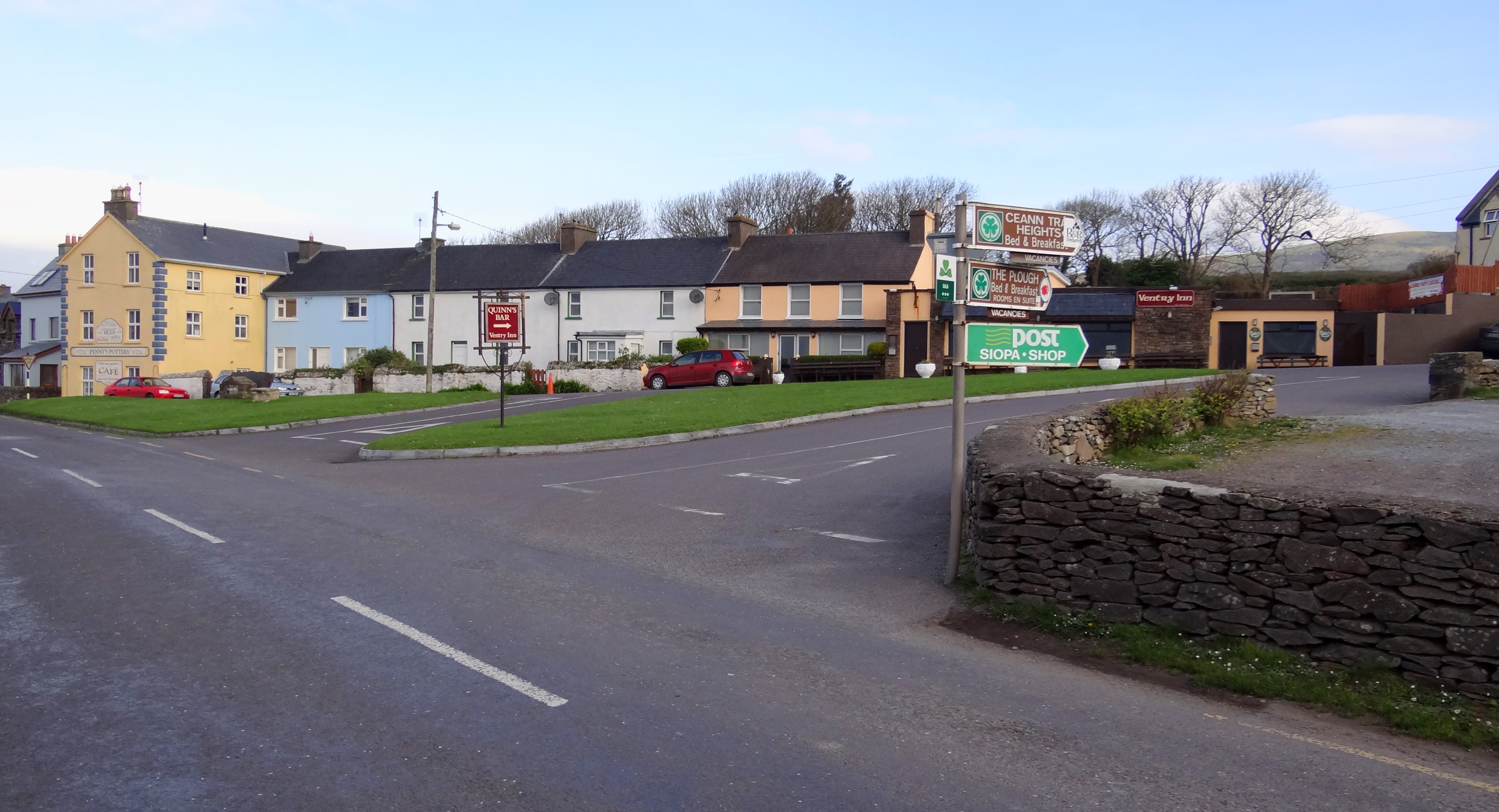
- The village centre

- Location in Ireland
- Coordinates: 52°08′00″N 10°21′59″W
- Country: Ireland
- Province: Munster
- County: County Kerry

Population (2011)
  - Total: 423
- Irish grid reference: Q381006
- Ceann Trá is the only official name.

Ventry (from Irish Fionntrá, meaning 'white beach'), officially Ceann Trá, is a Gaeltacht village in County Kerry, Ireland, on the Dingle Peninsula, 7 kilometres west of Dingle. Due to its long sandy beach, Ventry is a tourist destination.

== History ==
Six kilometres west of Ventry are the ruins of Dunbeg (An Dún Beag), an Iron Age promontory fort on the edge of a steep cliff. Near Dunbeg is Kilvickadownig, home to other archeological ruins, including examples of the beehive house and the grave of Caol or Cháil Mic Crimthainn, the last to die in the Battle of Ventry from the Fenian Cycle of Irish mythology.

Also within Ventry parish is Rahinnane Castle, which was the residence of the Knight of Kerry. The Knight of Kerry lived there until the Cromwellian conquest of Ireland. The castle was built on the site of an old ringfort. The ringfort was built up and a second added with walls of six metres (20 feet), giving the appearance that there might have been a moat (although there never was one). Rahinnane Castle retains some of its original features, including a set of narrow stone stairs that connect the first and second floors.

== Transport ==
The village is connected to Dingle via the R559 road which runs from Dingle through various villages on Slea Head.

As of 2024 there were daily bus services to Dingle.

== Notable people ==
- Sport shooter Dennis Fenton was born in the village.
- Canon James Goodman, the music collector and Professor of Irish at Trinity College, Dublin, was raised in Ventry.
- Ventry was home to Páidí Ó Sé, the well-known Kerry footballer, who owned a pub across from the parish church until his death in 2012.

== Ventry Bay ==
The bay or harbour is a suitable anchorage for sailing and fishing boats. On 4 October 1939, German submarine U-35 entered Ventry Bay and landed 28 Greek sailors of the MV Diamantis. Their ship had been torpedoed by a U-boat. The event was commemorated with a plaque in October 2009. Guests at the plaque unveiling included the then German Ambassador to Ireland, the mayor of the Oinousses Islands in the Aegean, as well as members of London's Greek shipping community.

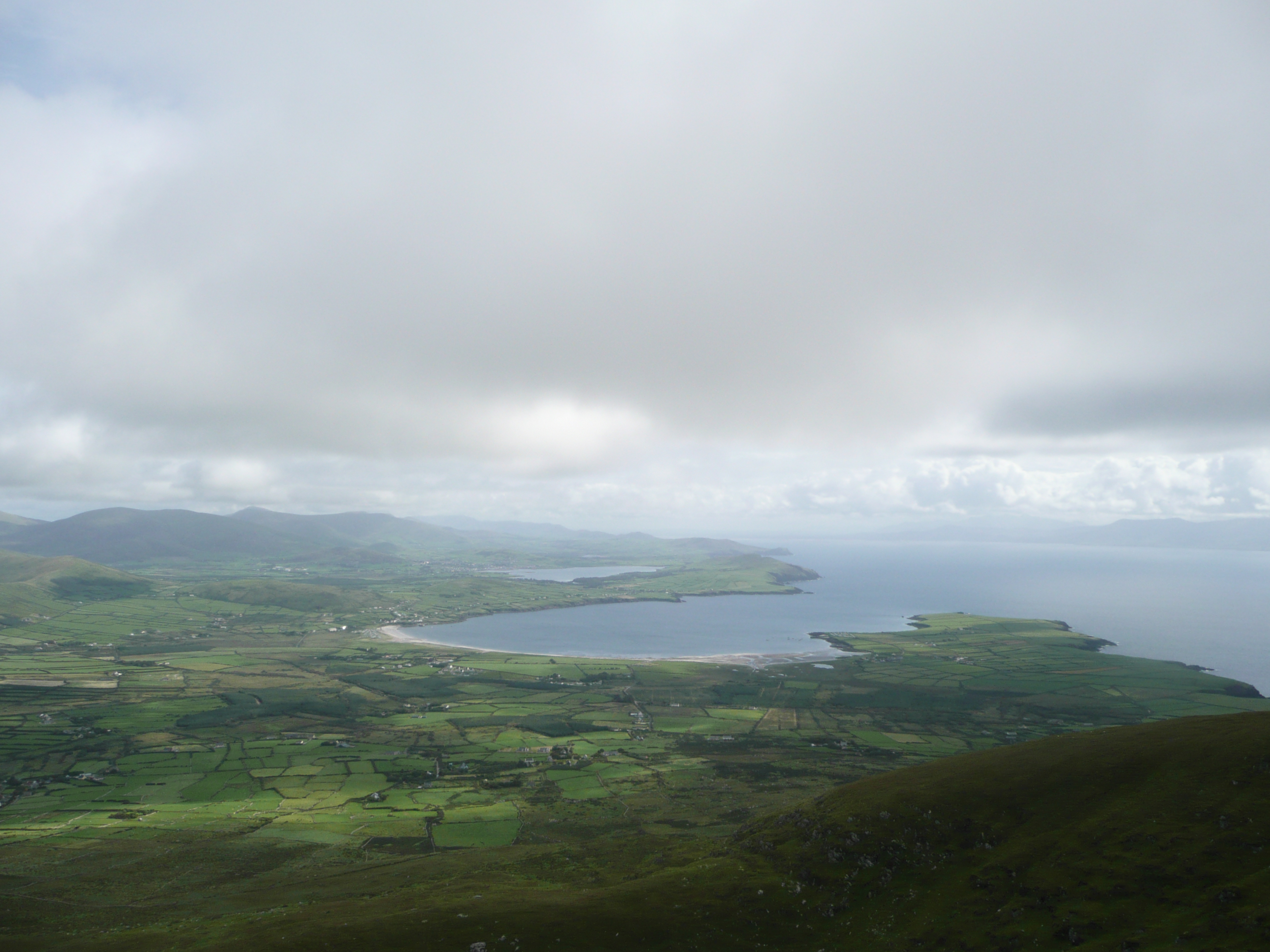
Ventry Harbour seen from Mount Eagle

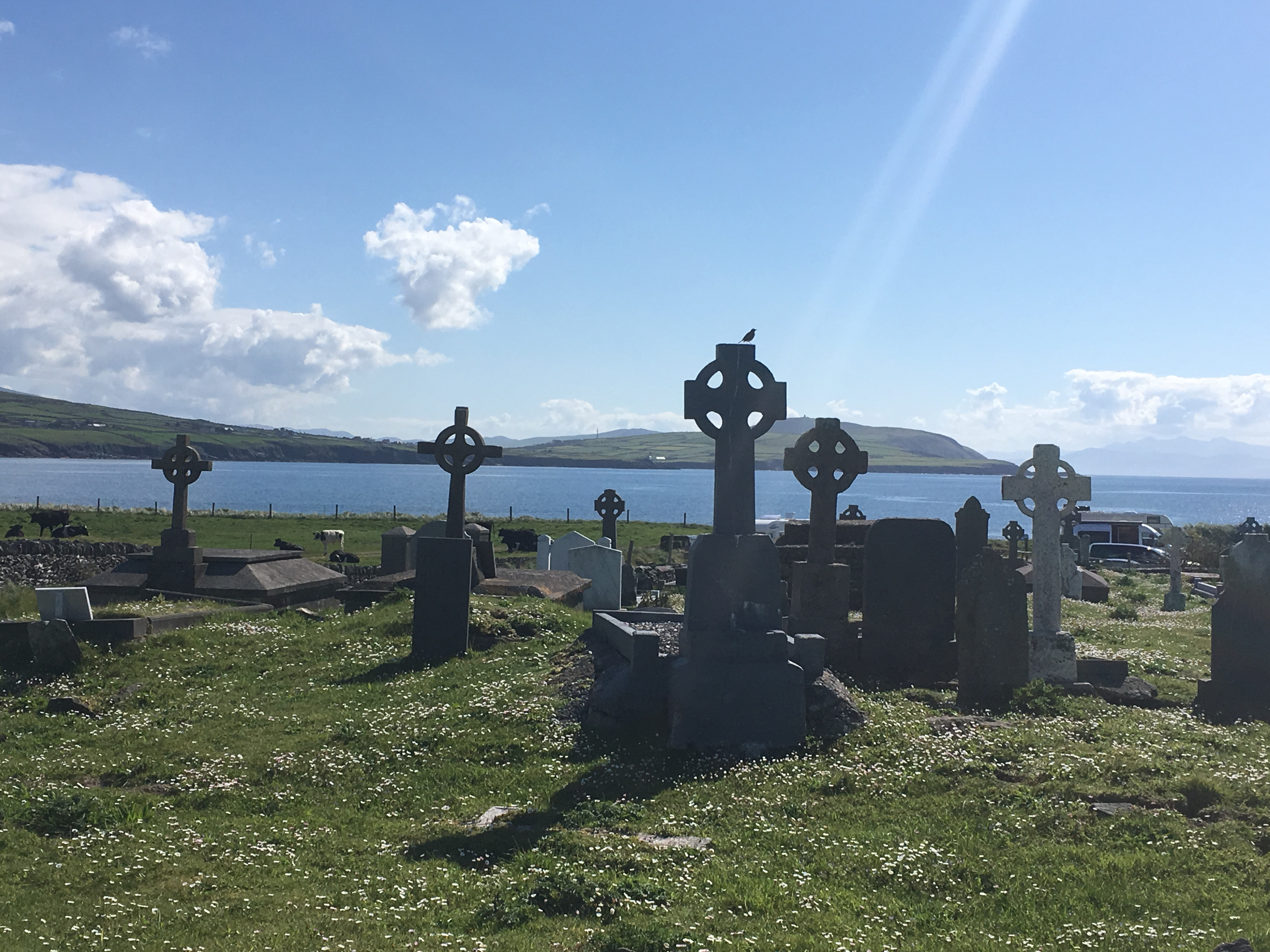
Ventury graveyard

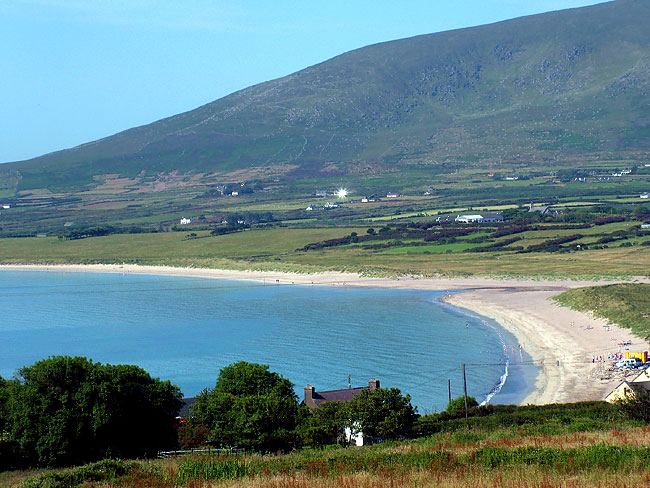
Ventry Beach

== See also ==
- List of towns and villages in Ireland
