= Mount Eagle (Ireland) =

Mountain in Kerry, Ireland

- Sliabh an Iolair
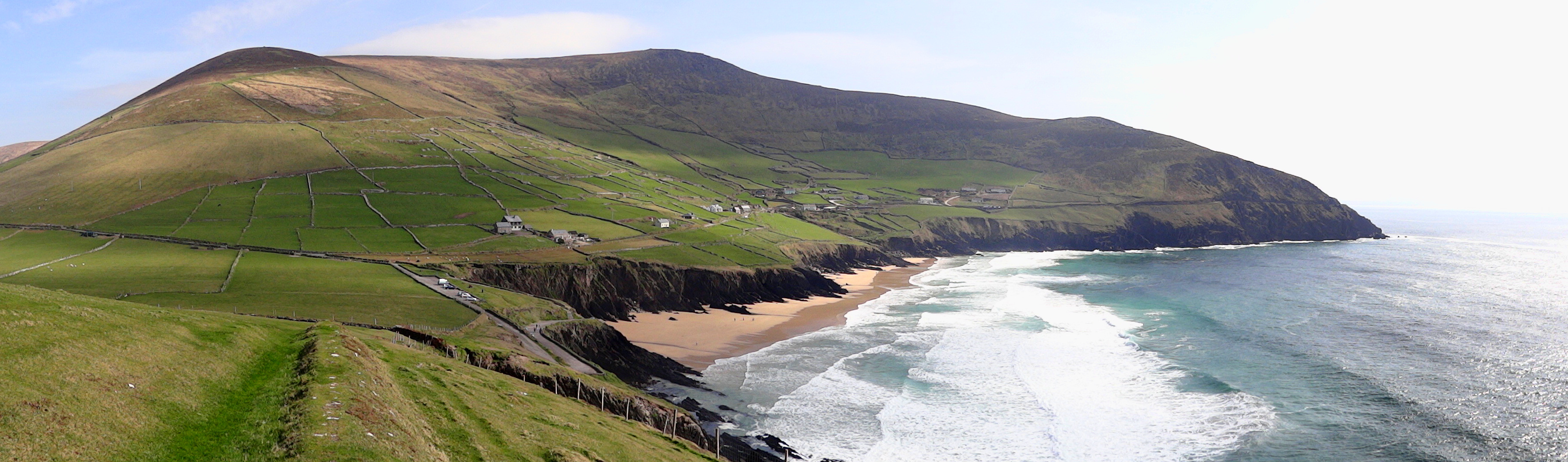

Highest point
- Elevation: 516 m (1,693 ft)
- Prominence: 461 m (1,512 ft)
- Listing: Marilyn
- Coordinates: 52°7′4.18″N 10°25′55.41″W

Naming
- English translation: Eagle mountain
- Language of name: Irish

Geography
- Location within Ireland
- Location: County Kerry, Ireland
- Parent range: Mountains of the Central Dingle Peninsula
- OSI/OSNI grid: V334989

Geology
- Mountain type: Mainly sandstone

Climbing
- First ascent: ancestral
- Easiest route: Hiking

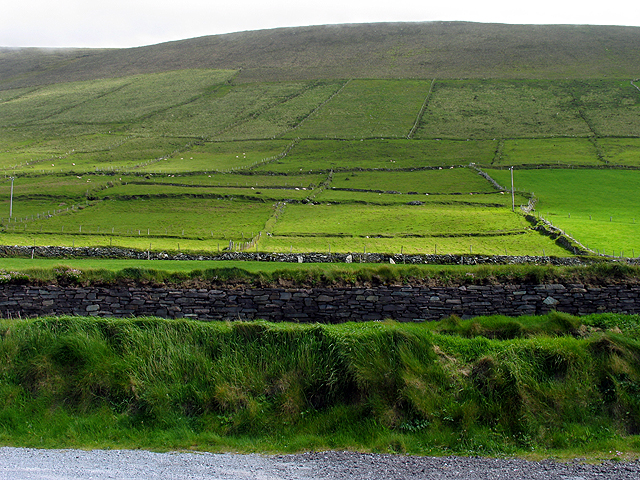
Pasture along the slopes of Mt.Eagle

Mount Eagle (Irish: Sliabh an Iolair, meaning 'eagle mountain') is a mountain in County Kerry, Ireland.

== Geography ==
The mountain is part of Mountains of the Central Dingle Peninsula and is the 419th highest in Ireland. Mount Eagle is located not faraway from Slea Head (Ceann Sléibhe), the most south-westerly point of the peninsula, and is connected with Mount Brandon by a ridge of lower hills. On the mountain's top stands a trig point.

== History ==
The mountain summit was the first European bit of land seen by Charles Lindbergh after his 1927 plane voyage across the Atlantic Ocean.

== Access to the summit ==
Mount Eagle summit can be reached with a medium walk from Ventry Harbour. From the top of the mountain there is a good view of the neighbouring coast and the Blasket Islands.

== See also ==
- List of mountains in Ireland
- List of Marilyns in Ireland
