= George Victor Du Noyer =

Irish artist

- Born: George Victor Du Noyer; 1817; Dublin, Ireland
- Died: 3 January 1869 (aged 51–52); County Antrim, Ireland
- Known for: Painting

George Victor Du Noyer MRIA (1817 – 3 January 1869) was an Irish painter, geologist and antiquary of Huguenot descent. As an artist, his favourite medium was watercolour, but a large number of sketches by him in pencil and other mediums also survive. He was a gifted and extremely prolific artist.

Most of his work relates exclusively to Ireland. Throughout his life, he was often commissioned to draw or paint realistic depictions of locations all over Ireland (making many of his works interesting from an Irish historical perspective). Much of this work took place during his time with the Irish Ordnance Survey and particularly the Geological Survey of Ireland.

== Personal life ==
Born in 1817 and raised in Dublin, Ireland, George Victor Du Noyer, he was the son of Louis Victor Du Noyer (1782–1868) and Margaret Du Bédat (1794–1876), both of Huguenot descent. They had married in 1816. His father, Louis Victor, was a French teacher in Dublin.

On 4 January 1858, George Victor Du Noyer married Frances Adélaide Du Bédat (1833–1914).

They had five children – William Victor (born 1859), Fanny (born April 1864 – died 2 January 1869), Charlotte Eugéne (born 20 July 1865), and Henry Westropp and Joseph Du Bédat, twins (born 18 March 1867). The family lived at Albertville, Sydney Avenue, Blackrock, Co . Dublin, for many years.

On 3 January 1869, George Victor Du Noyer died of scarlet fever while on Survey in County Antrim, one day after his daughter Fanny died of the same disease. Du Noyer was buried in County Antrim.

Throughout his life Du Noyer lived at various addresses in Dublin. However, the nature of his work meant that he was often absent from Dublin for long periods at a time.

== Career ==
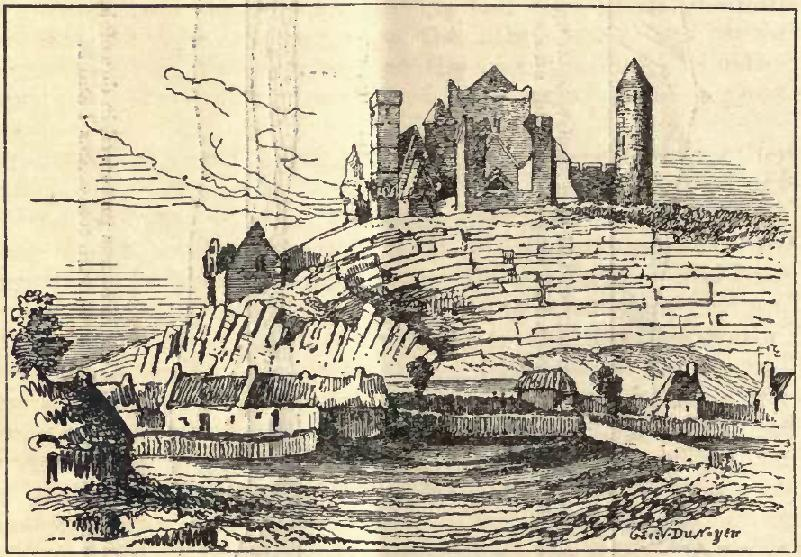
Mid-19th century drawing of the Rock of Cashel, County Tipperary, Ireland, showing geology of the rock outcrop, by Du Noyer.

In 1834 he was employed by the Civilian Department of the Irish Ordnance Survey. He remained there for a number of years – during a period when Ireland was being mapped by the Ordnance Survey for the first time.

He became a member of the 'Geological Society of Dublin' on 20 November 1843. In October 1848, he became a Temporary Assistant Geologist with the Geological Survey of Ireland. In April 1849, he became an Assistant Geologist with the Survey. In April 1867, Du Noyer became the Geological Survey of Ireland's first District Surveyor and moved to Carrigfergus, County Antrim.

Du Noyer's art includes works on plants, animals, fish, fossils, geology, maps, landscapes, people, country houses, historic buildings and antiquities, as well as on other subjects.

One of his well-known works is Killiney Head looking towards Bray, County Wicklow, a landscape painted in watercolor in 1866. When compared with this part of County Dublin today, a change is noticeable – with what was in Du Noyer's time a rural area having since become part of the city of Dublin.

Most of his best work is in the collections of the Geological Survey of Ireland, the Royal Irish Academy, the National Museum of Ireland, the National Botanic Gardens. and the Royal Society of Antiquaries of Ireland. However, his work is also located elsewhere and some is in private collections. Note that prints of his most famous geological sketches can be viewed and purchased at the offices of the Geological Survey of Ireland

Du Noyer was a member of the Royal Irish Academy. He was also a member of a number of societies associated with his various fields of interest.

== Bibliography ==
- Croke, Fionnuala, ed. (1995). George Victor du Noyer – Hidden Landscapes. Dublin: The National Gallery of Ireland. ISBN 0-903162-71-7.
