= Crosskirk Broch =

- Crosskirk, Caithness, Scotland
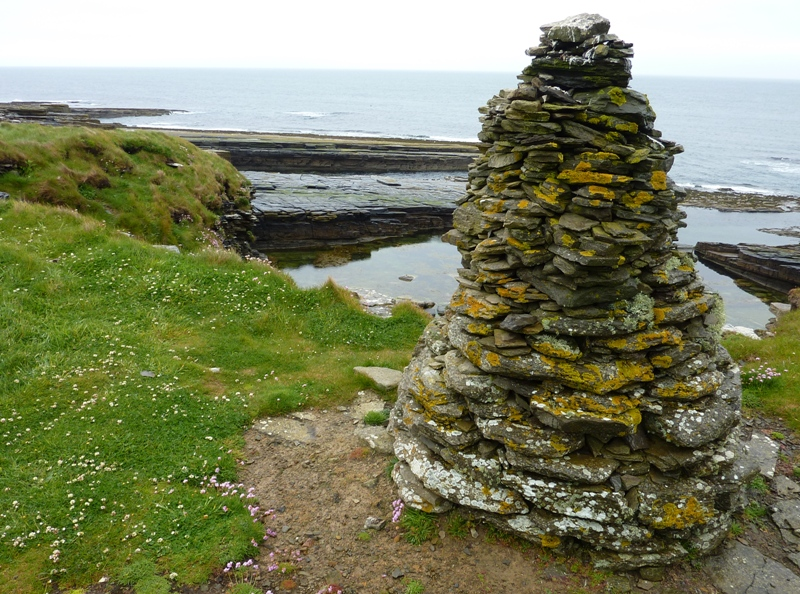
- Crosskirk Broch memorial cairn, overlooking the site of the broch.

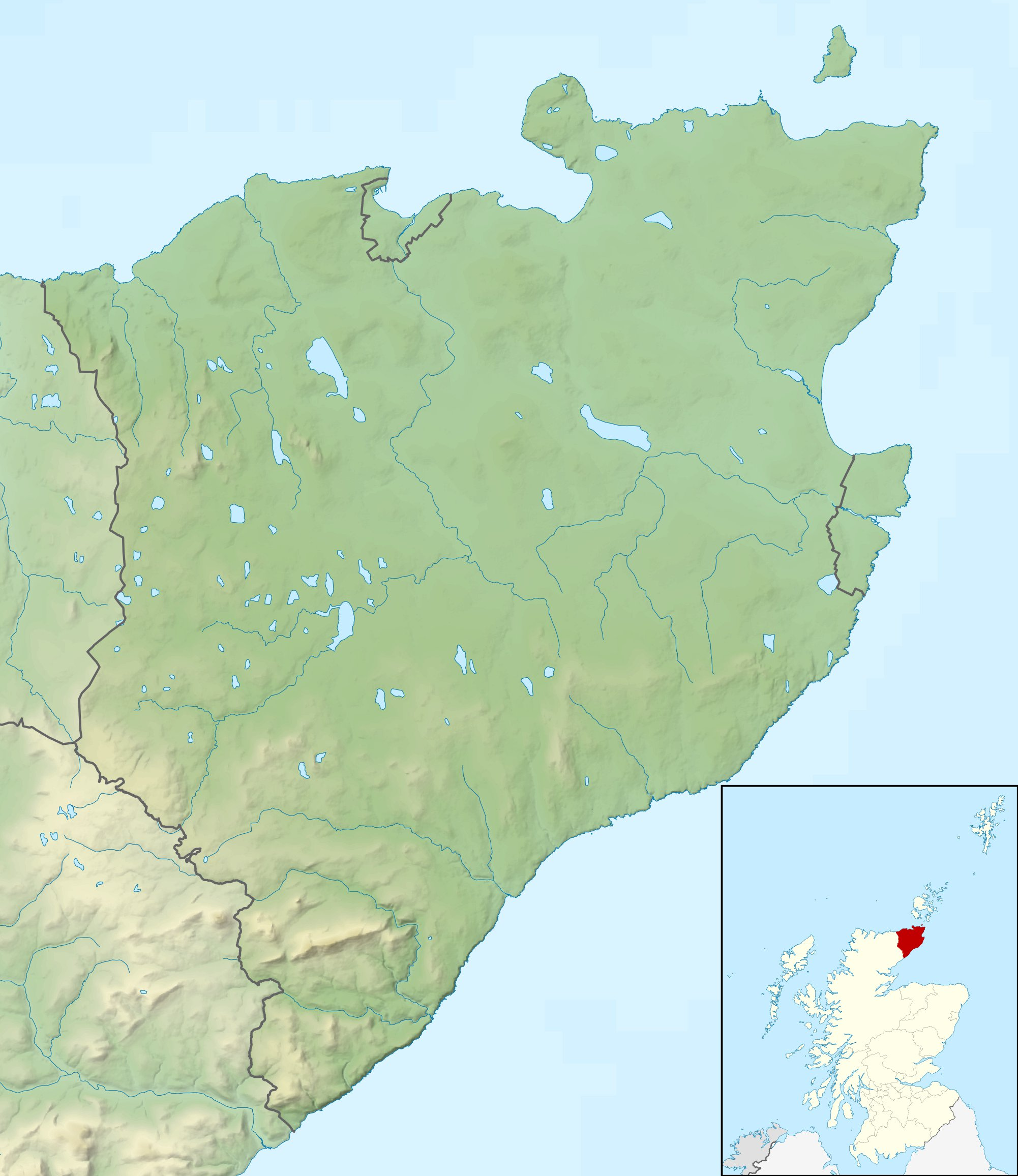
- Location in Caithness

Site information
- Condition: Destroyed by the sea

Location
- Coordinates: 58.608197°N 3.679948°W

Site history
- Built: Iron age
- Materials: Stone

Crosskirk Broch was a fortification near the present day hamlet of Crosskirk near Thurso, Caithness, Scotland. After thorough archaeological exploration it was destroyed in 1972 since the site had become unsafe due to sea erosion. The site was unusual in having a broch, a large circular fortification, built within an older promontory fortification with a ring wall and blockhouse.

== History ==
Crosskirk was occupied at the end of the Bronze Age. From the early Iron Age that followed there is carinated pottery that appears to be locally made but is similar to pottery of the same period in southern and eastern England. A few samples are black-burnished. Uncorrected radiocarbon dates for this pottery are in the 6th and 5th centuries BC. There seems to be a discontinuity in the middle Iron Age when the buildings were reconstructed and new types of pottery and artifacts were introduced, although variants of some of the older styles continued. This may be interpreted as being due to the influx of some influential new population.

Further use of local pottery continued into the period of Roman occupation of the south of Scotland in 80-180 AD. There were also remains of Roman pottery and glassware that may have been Roman in origin. A body was buried in a sitting position in the middle of an approximately circular building around the time that the site was abandoned. No grave goods were found.

There are traces of two long cist burials in the debris of the broch from some time around 600 AD. There used to be a stone with a runic inscription at Crosskirk, now lost, dating from the period of the Norse raiders in the 9th, 10th and 11th centuries. St Mary's Chapel (Crosskirk), built around the 13th century and now ruined, is about 30 yards (27 m) south of the site. Some of the land south of the broch was levelled when St Mary's was built. In recent times, some of the stones from the broch mound were removed, perhaps for building field dykes.

== Structure ==
The promontory fort predated the broch, which was built inside the older structure. The earlier structure was an outwork that began at the edge of the promontory in the east, a 15 feet (4.6 m) thick wall or rampart of rock with an earth core. A gateway that widened towards the outside provided access through the wall. To the west of the gateway the rampart included a structure like a cell, and then there was a recess in the inner face of the wall. The outwork continued west, ending in a fence made of flagstones that reached to the cliff edge at Chapel Geo.

Based on radiocarbon dates, the broch was built around 200 BC, and was still in use in the second century AD. The broch would have given an impression of great strength, rising above the existing defensive wall. It included a guard cell, an intramural chamber and a stair entrance at ground level. Although the wall of the broch was relatively thick, it was poorly built, with a core of earth, rubble and boulders. This may be interpreted as being an early, experimental broch design. The roundhouse was not built strongly enough to support a tower more than 4.5 metres (15 ft), half the height of later towers.

There were external buildings around the tower that are thought to have been a village, an arrangement found only in northern Scotland. These houses were occupied from about the same time as the broch was completed. During the next two centuries there were a series of changes and repairs to the broch, but they could not overcome its underlying weakness of design, and by the end of that period it would have been in poor shape. During the same period, house enclosures of the settlement outside the broch but within the rampart were steadily added and improved. A final phase of occupation and construction took place in the 2nd century AD, when the broch was rehabilitated before being finally abandoned. During this last period it seems that there was no defensive concern.

== Economy ==
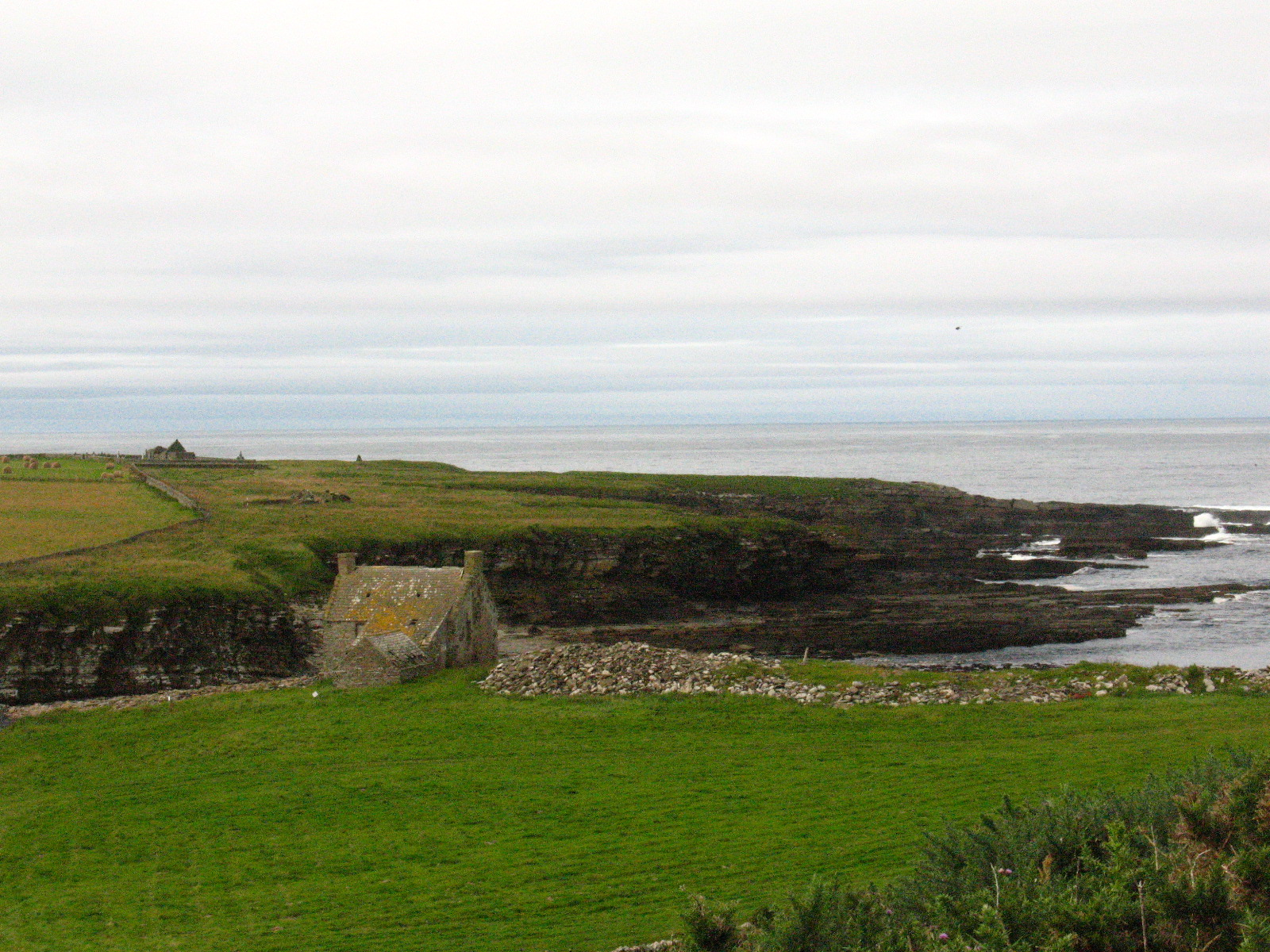
St Mary's Chapel, Crosskirk, from a distance. The chapel is outlined against the sea near the left of the picture. It stands about 30 yards (27 m) to the south of the broch.

The main crop was barley. Samples found at Crosskirk and Bu also include the seeds of other plants such as fat hen, sorrel and chick weed. This mix was probably deliberate, since the other seeds have medical and nutritional value. Cattle and some sheep were raised, and were supported through the winters. The people ate shellfish, particularly limpets, winkles and whelks, and ate seabirds. At nearby locations there is evidence of deep sea fishing for plaice and cod, and of consumption of venison. The evidence shows that the community had an ample and varied diet, and was largely self-sufficient.

== Excavation and destruction ==
An 1871 description of the broch said it

has an internal diameter of approximately 30 to 32ft and a wall 14 to 15ft thick. It has been broken into from the S, where there appears to have been an entrance to the left of which the sides of a chamber are visible in the wall. At the edge of the cliff, some 20ft of wall about 4 to 5ft high is exposed. On the landward side about 10ft from the broch are the remains of an outer bank or wall, now some 8ft wide at the base.

A report in 1964 said the broch was visible as a circular enclosure, covered in grass, with the wall no more than 1.1 metres (3 ft 7 in) high on the inside, and no more than 1.5 metres (4 ft 11 in) high on the exterior. The cliff edge had eroded, partly exposing traces of the north of the wall. There was a shallow depression around the broch and a low bank on the southwest side that may have been the remains of the outer defense wall. Coastal erosion was undercutting the cliff, making the site unsafe. Between 1966 and 1972 Fairhurst and Taylor excavated the ruin. The remains of the broch were then pushed over the cliff by a bulldozer, the site grassed over, and a memorial cairn erected.

== Notes and references ==
Citations

Sources

- British Archaeological Association (1889). The journal of the British Archaeological Association. British Archaeological Association. p. 305.
- Cunliffe, Barry (10 September 2012). Iron Age Communities in Britain: An Account of England, Scotland and Wales from the Seventh Century BC until the Roman Conquest. Routledge. p. 321. ISBN 978-1-134-93803-2.
- Fairhurst, Horace; Breeze, David John (1984). Excavations at CrossKirk Broch, Caithness. Society Antiquaries Scotland. ISBN 978-0-903903-03-5.
- Green, Miranda (6 December 2012). The Celtic World. Taylor & Francis. ISBN 978-0-415-05764-6.
- Henderson, Jon C. (2007). The Atlantic Iron Age: Settlement and Identity in the First Millennium BC. Routledge. p. 331. ISBN 978-0-415-43642-7.
- "Crosskirk". RCAHMS.
