= Broch of Clickimin =

Broch in Lerwick, Shetland, Scotland

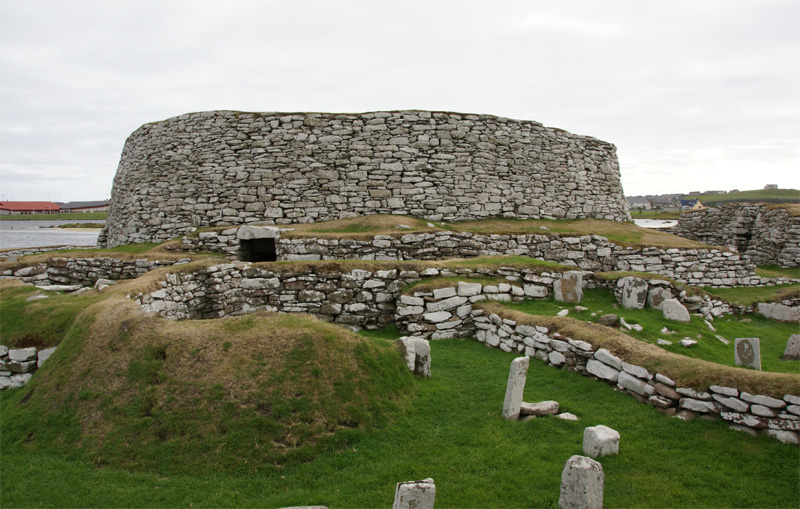
- Broch of Clickimin
- Interactive map of Broch of Clickimin
- 60°08′57″N 1°09′56″W
- Type: Broch
- Periods: Iron Age
- Location: Mainland, Shetland

Site notes
- Owner: Historic Scotland

Scheduled monument
- Official name: Clickimin Broch, broch and settlement
- Designated: 18 August 1882
- Reference no.: SM90077

The Broch of Clickimin (also Clickimin or Clickhimin Broch) is a large, well-preserved but restored broch in Lerwick, Shetland, Scotland (grid reference HU46434082). Originally built on an island in Clickimin Loch, it was approached by a stone causeway. The broch is situated within a walled enclosure and, unusually for brochs, features a large "forework" or "blockhouse" between the opening in the enclosure and the broch itself. The site is maintained by Historic Scotland. According to its excavator, John R.C. Hamilton, there were several periods of occupation of the site: Late Bronze Age farmstead, Early Iron Age farmstead, Iron Age fort, broch period, and wheelhouse settlement.

== Location ==
Clickimin Broch is situated on the south shore of the Clickimin Loch, three-quarters of a mile south-west of Lerwick on the Lerwick-Sumburgh road. It sits on a small promontory jutting into the loch. It is one of the best preserved broch sites in Shetland.

== Description ==
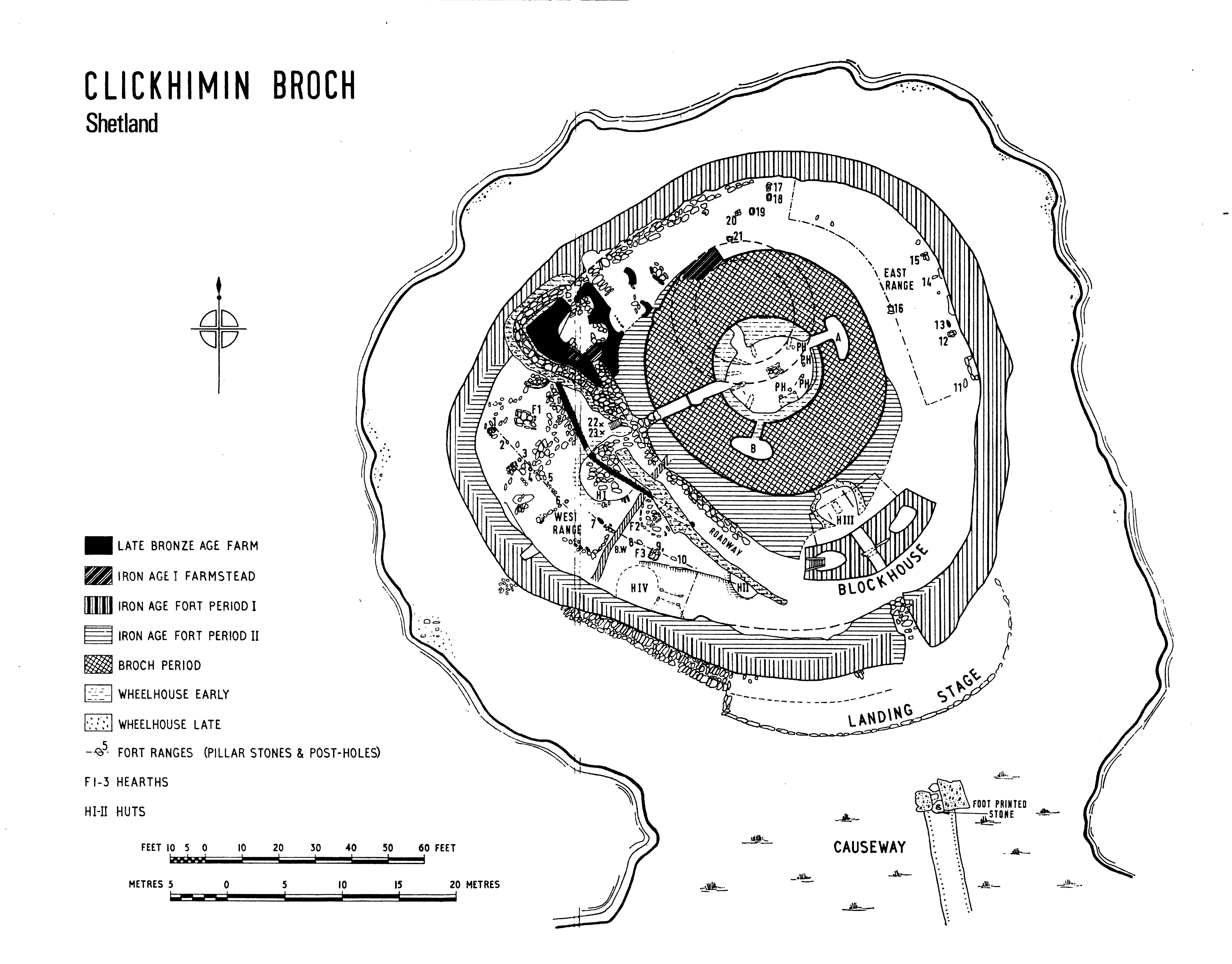
Plan of the Broch of Clickhimin, from Hamilton (1970)

The broch has an external diameter of around 20 metres and an internal diameter of around 9 metres. It is surrounded by a stone-walled fort consisting of a blockhouse and ringwork. The blockhouse is a free-standing drystone gateway set just within the entrance to the fort. Access to the broch is achieved via the entrance on the western side. The entrance passage may have had a "guard cell", now blocked up, on the right side, just inside the door jamb. The interior of the broch has two cells within the walls at ground-level. Excavations have revealed the postholes for internal timber buildings and in the 19th century there were said to have been radiating stone piers visible. There are two additional entrances to the broch at upper levels. The north entrance leads both into the interior and to a staircase. The other entrance leads to an intramural gallery.

== History ==
The broch was originally excavated and cleared in 1861–2. Following major vandalism and dilapidation, parts of the site were rebuilt by the Office of Works in 1908–10. It was excavated again between 1953 and 1957 by J. R. C. Hamilton, who proposed a complex chronology for it. The earliest occupation of the site, according to Hamilton, was a small Late Bronze Age farmstead of the 7th or 6th centuries BC which (he said) was superseded by a larger circular Iron Age farmhouse built about the 5th century BC. In the 4th, or early 3rd century BC, Hamilton continued, a stone-walled fort consisting of the blockhouse and ringwork was constructed, which was in turn superseded by the broch in about the 1st century AD. In the 2nd and 3rd centuries AD a large wheelhouse was built within the reduced tower and with minor outhouses, storage pits and cattle stalls dug in the debris inside the older defences.

In recent years Hamilton's schema has been challenged by archaeologists and others: the ring wall, blockhouse and broch are now usually assumed to be contemporary. For a full account see B. Smith, 'How not to reconstruct the Iron Age in Shetland: modern interpretations of Clickimin broch', Northern Studies, 47, 2015.

== Archaeology and discoveries ==
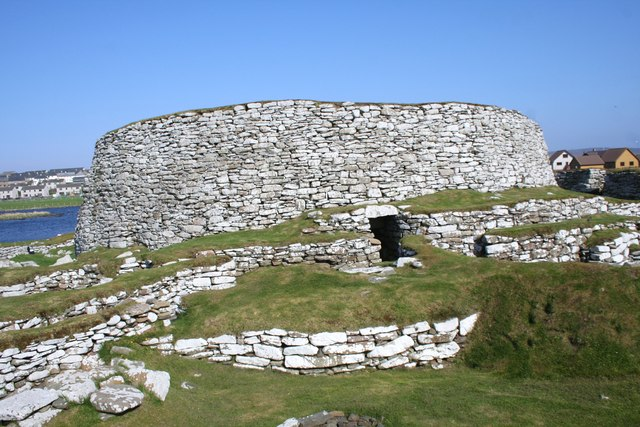
Clickimin Broch, showing the central broch tower and the surrounding outer walls of the fortified settlement.

The Broch of Clickimin was excavated between 1953 and 1957 under the direction of the British archaeologist J. R. C. Hamilton on behalf of the Ministry of Works. Before excavation, the monument appeared mainly as a grassy mound rising from the small island in the Loch of Clickimin, with sections of stone wall visible at the surface. Hamilton's work gradually revealed the broch tower along with its surrounding defences and the remains of earlier and later buildings. The results were later published in Hamilton's monograph Excavations at Clickimin, Shetland (1968).

Excavation showed that the site developed through several phases of settlement. Beneath and around the broch tower archaeologists uncovered traces of earlier roundhouses and occupation layers, showing that communities lived on the promontory long before the tower was built. Later inhabitants continued to occupy the site after the broch began to fall into ruin, constructing a wheelhouse and other domestic structures within the partly collapsed walls. These discoveries reveal a settlement that remained occupied and repeatedly rebuilt over several centuries.

The excavations also clarified the defensive layout of the site. Archaeologists identified a substantial stone ring wall protecting the settlement, together with an entrance blockhouse controlling access across the narrow approach to the promontory. Outside this were defensive earthworks including a ditch and rampart. These features show that the broch formed part of a fortified enclosure rather than standing as an isolated tower.

A wide range of everyday objects was recovered from the occupation deposits. Finds include stone lamps, whetstones, bone and whalebone objects, a die, a few bronze objects, and two fragments of Roman glass. Pottery fragments were among the most common finds, including coarse, hand made Iron Age vessels used for cooking, storage and food preparation. These simple wares formed the basic household equipment of the settlement's inhabitants.

Stone tools linked to food processing were also discovered. Saddle querns and rubbing stones were used to grind grain into flour, indicating that cereals formed part of the local diet. Other stone tools, including hammerstones, were likely used in building work or small craft activities carried out within the settlement.

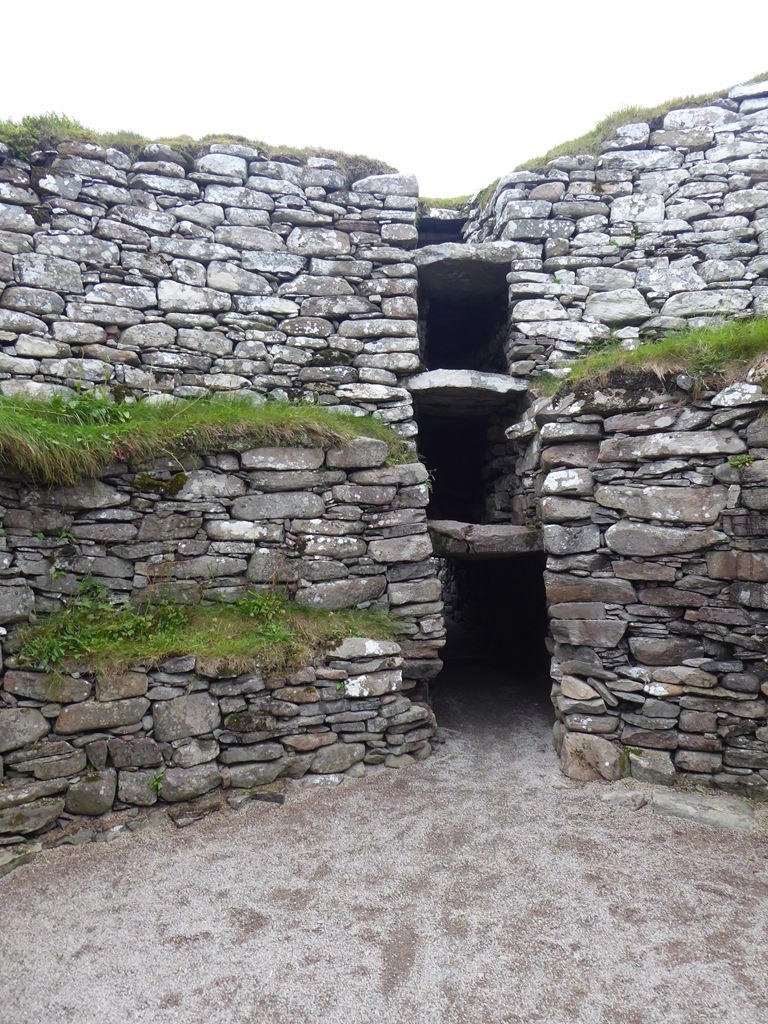
Inside Clickimin Broch

Evidence of textile production was recovered in the form of spindle whorls and related implements used in spinning wool into thread. Wool processing and cloth production were common household activities at Iron Age settlements, and similar tools have been found at many broch sites across northern Scotland.

Animal bones recovered from the site provide insight into the inhabitants' diet and farming practices. The assemblage included cattle, sheep and pigs, indicating that livestock farming formed the basis of the local economy. Bones of red deer and fish were also present, showing that hunting and fishing supplemented domesticated food resources. Shellfish remains suggest that marine foods gathered from nearby coastal waters were regularly consumed.

Artefacts made from bone and antler were also discovered, including tools, pins and worked fragments used for small domestic tasks or personal adornment.

No formal burials were identified during the excavations. Instead, the archaeological evidence from Clickimin reflects everyday life in an Iron Age community, including food preparation, textile work, animal husbandry and small scale craft production. The artefacts recovered closely resemble those found at other broch settlements in northern Scotland, suggesting that Clickimin formed part of a wider pattern of Iron Age domestic life in the region.

Hamilton's excavations significantly improved scholarly understanding of broch settlements in Shetland. Rather than a single defensive tower standing alone, the discoveries at Clickimin showed that brochs often formed the centre of larger communities where people lived, worked and rebuilt their homes over many generations.

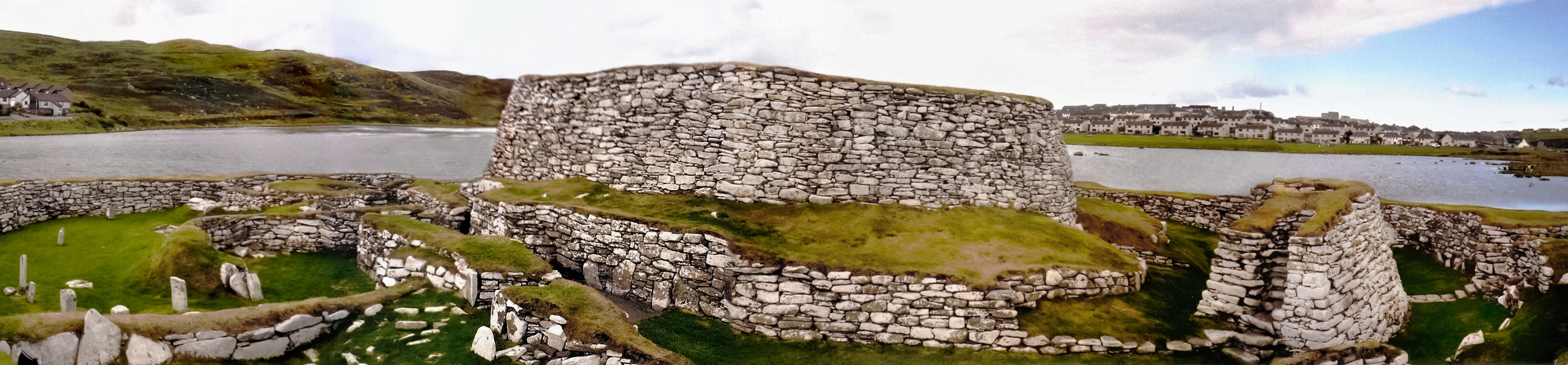
The Broch of Clickimin

== Images ==
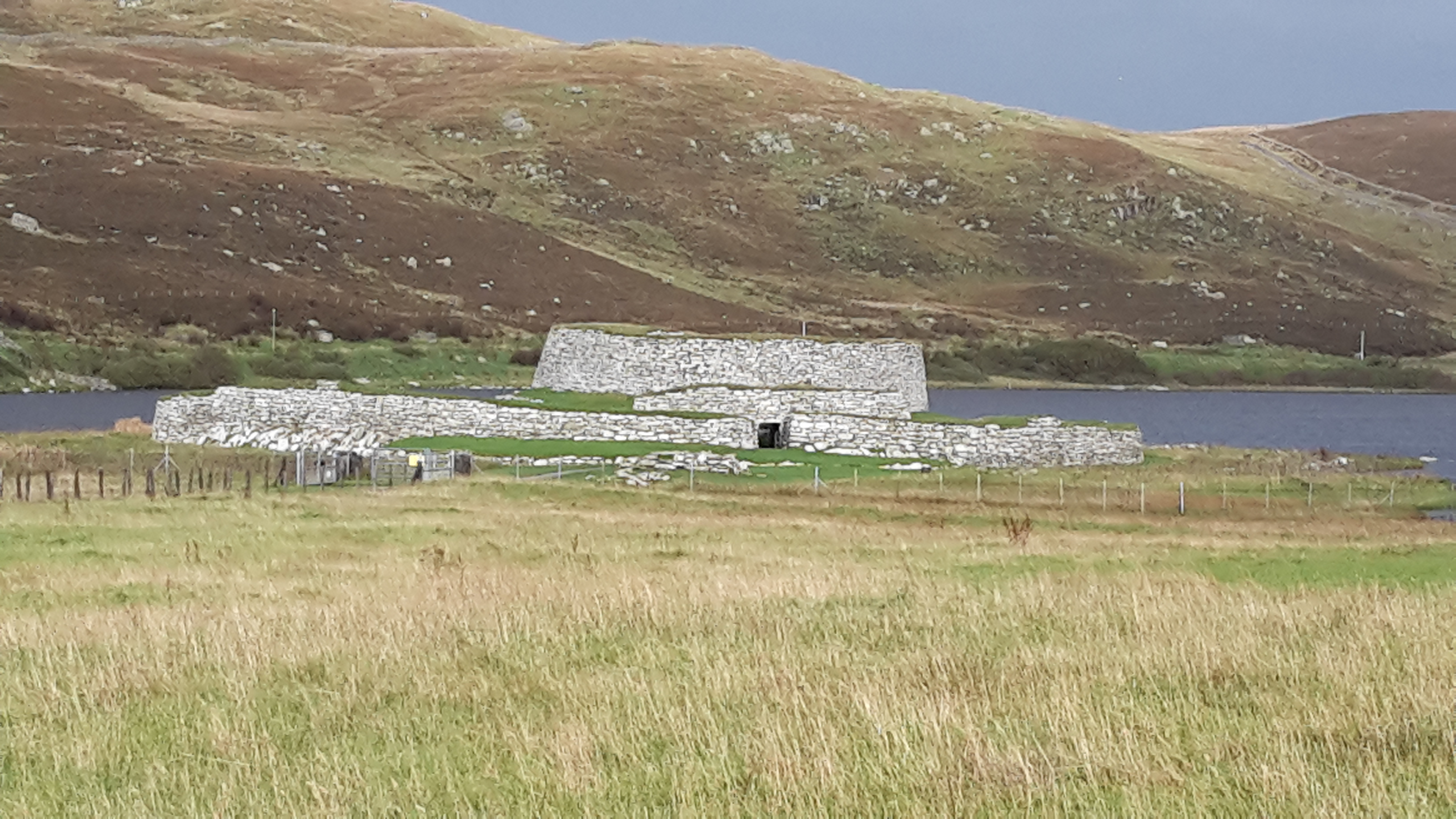
The Broch of Clickimin

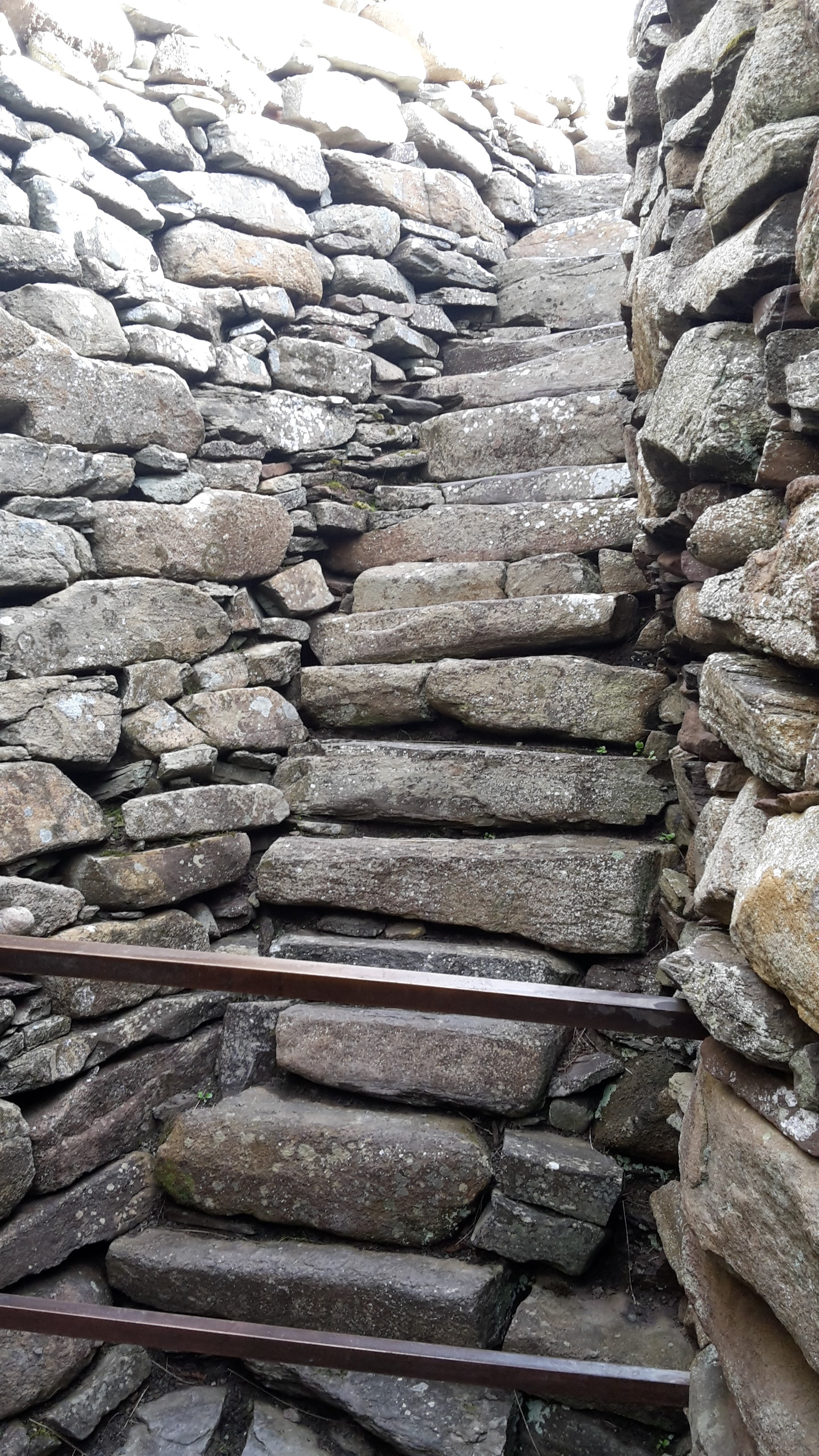
Stairs at the Broch of Clickimin
