= McCollough =

McCollough is a surname. Notable people with the surname include:

- Aaron McCollough (born 1971), American poet
- Celeste McCollough (1926–2023), American scientist
- Clair McCollough (1904–1995), American broadcasting executive
- Evan McCollough (born 1987), American football player
- Jack McCollough (born 1978), fashion designer
- Jaylen McCollough (born 2000), American football player
- W. Alan McCollough (born 1950), American businessman

== See also ==
- McCullagh
- MacCulloch
- McCulloch
- McCullough
- McCollough effect, an optical illusion, named after Celeste McCollough
