= McCulloch (disambiguation) =

McCulloch is a surname.

McCulloch may also refer to:

== Places ==
- McCulloch County, Texas

== Ships ==
- USRC McCulloch, name of more than one cutter of the United States Revenue Cutter Service
- USCGC McCulloch, name of more than one cutter of the United States Coast Guard
- USS McCulloch, cutter in commission in the United States Navy in 1917

== Other uses ==
- McCulloch Motors Corporation, chainsaw and power tool manufacturer
- McCulloch Aircraft Corporation
- McCulloch v. Maryland, U.S. Supreme Court ruling

== See also ==
- MacCulloch
- McCullagh
- McCullough (disambiguation)
- McAuliffe (disambiguation) (including MacAuliffe)
