= McCullough =

McCullough (/məˈkʌlək, -lə/) is an Irish and Scottish surname, with two distinct Gaelic origins:

- Mac Cú Uladh which means 'son of Cú Uladh' ('Hound of Ulster').
- Mac Cullaich 'son of Cullach' ('boar'), usually rendered McCulloch

Derivation from the Irish Gaelic Mac Cú Uladh 'son of the hound of Ulster' is more probable. While Cú Uladh may allude to the legendary Irish figure Cú Chulainn, it was a common given name in medieval Ireland. In Ulster it was often in use by the O'Neills of Clandeboye, the MacMahons of Oriel, the MacCanns, and the MacDonlevy kings of Ulaid. The spellings McCulloch and MacCulloch are more common in Scotland (especially Galloway), and is associated with Clan MacCulloch.

People with the surname include:

- Alfred McCullough (born 1989), American football player
- Alison McCullough, British speech and language therapist
- Andrew McCullough (born 1990), Australian Rugby League player
- Bernie Mac (born Bernard Jeffrey McCullough, 1957–2008), American comedian and actor
- Billy McCullough (1935–2026), Northern Ireland footballer
- Brian McCullough (born 1985), American college baseball coach
- Chris McCullough (born 1995), American basketball player
- Clayton McCullough (born 1979), American baseball coach
- Clinton McCullough (1844–1895), American politician and lawyer from Maryland
- Clyde McCullough (1917–1982), Irish baseball player
- Colleen McCullough (1937–2015), Australian author
- Conde McCullough (1887–1946), American bridge engineer
- David McCullough (1933–2022), American historian and author
- Dean McCullough (born 1992), Northern Irish radio presenter and DJ
- Denis McCullough (1883–1968), Irish rebel in the early 20th century
- Donald McCullough (disambiguation), several people
- Douglas McCullough, American judge
- Ellen McCullough (1908 or 1909–1985), British trade unionist
- Esther Morgan McCullough (1888–1957), American author
- Frank S. McCullough (1905–1998), New York politician and judge
- Frisby McCullough (1828-1862), Confederate officer executed during the American Civil War
- George McCullough (born 1975), American football player
- Helen Craig McCullough (1918–1998), American scholar of classical Japanese poetry and prose
- Henry McCullough (1943–2016), Northern Irish musician
- Henry M. McCullough (1858–1930), American politician and lawyer
- Hiram McCullough (1813–1885), U.S. Congressman from Maryland
- J. McCullough, Scottish author and avid golfer of the late 19th century
- J. J. McCullough, Canadian YouTuber
- James McCullough (disambiguation), several people
- Jethro J. McCullough (1810–1878), American politician and businessman
- John McCullough (disambiguation), several people
- Joy McCullough, American author
- Julie McCullough (born 1965), American model and actress
- Kimberly McCullough (born 1978), American actress
- Liam McCullough (born 1997), American football player
- Louis McCullough, American basketball player
- Luke McCullough (born 1994), Irish footballer
- Michael McCullough (entrepreneur) (born 1966), American social entrepreneur, investor and physician
- Michael McCullough (psychologist) (born 1969), American psychologist and author
- Mike McCullough (disambiguation), several people
- Naida McCullough (c. 1901 – 1989), American educator, pianist, and composer
- Paul McCullough (1883–1936), American actor and comedian
- Paul McCullough (baseball) (1898–1970), American baseball pitcher
- Paul McCullough (footballer) (born 1959), English football goalkeeper
- Peter McCullough (disambiguation), several people
- Philo McCullough (1893–1981), American actor
- Richard D. McCullough (born 1959), American chemist, entrepreneur, and university president
- Robert McCullough (disambiguation), several people
- Saladin McCullough (born 1975), American football player
- Shanna McCullough (born 1960), American adult film star
- Suli McCullough (born 1968), American comic-actor and writer
- Sultan McCullough (born 1980), National Football League running back
- Wayne McCullough (born 1970), Northern Irish boxer
- William McCullough (disambiguation), several people

== See also ==
- Clan McCulloch
- McCullagh
- McCulloch
