= McCullouch =

McCullouch is a surname. Notable people with the surname include:

- Earl McCullouch (born 1946), American football player
- Gerald McCullouch (born 1967), American actor, director, and screenwriter

== See also ==
- McCulloch
- McCullough
