= Charles Shute (academic) =

English physician and academic

Charles Cameron Donald Shute (1917–1999) was an English physician and academic, known for his research on neurotransmitters and the McCollough effect.

== Early life ==
He was the son of Amy Bertha Ernestine Pepper-Staveley (1878–1958), known as Mrs. Cameron Shute as a writer, and her second husband Cameron Dinsdale Deane Shute, for a short period an army officer; the writer Nerina Shute was his elder sister. His parents separated when he was two years old. His mother left the country, and Charles Shute was fostered by his godmother Kathleen Cross.

Shute attended Stoke House prep school in Seaford, Sussex, and in 1930 won a scholarship to Eton College. Nerina commented "My brother had little love as a child, but a good education, I had plenty of love but little education." Ultimately he was adopted by his godmother. His mother returned to the United Kingdom, in the early 1930s, and married for a fourth time. At the same period, his father went to live in Belgium.

== Cambridge and medicine ==
In 1936 Shute was admitted to King's College, Cambridge, with an exhibition awarded for mathematics. He studied for two years for Part I English in the Tripos, then two years for the Part I prelim in the Moral Sciences Tripos (philosophy) with an Eton minor scholarship in 1939, gaining respective classes of 2:1 and first, and graduating B.A. in 1940, M.A. in 1944. During the war, he was a conscientious objector and served with the Friends' Ambulance Unit. He went on to be a medical student at Cambridge in 1945 and at Middlesex Hospital in 1946, where he was a house surgeon in 1947. He joined the Royal Army Medical Corps in 1948, by way of doing his National Service, in an otorhinolaryngology unit.

== Academic ==
In 1945 Shute took the degrees of M.B. and B.Chir. at Cambridge; in 1958 he graduated M.D. In 1949 he lectured in anatomy at the Middlesex and the London Hospital. From 1951 he was demonstrator and lecturer in anatomy at London Hospital Medical College, and also worked with Angus Bellairs in the research group of James Dixon Boyd. When in 1952 Dixon Boyd took a position at Cambridge, Shute was appointed university demonstrator and lecturer there. In 1957 he was made a Life Fellow of Christ's College, Cambridge.

Moving on from his earlier interests in amphibian ears, Shute worked with the neurobiologist Peter Raymond Lewis (1924–2007) on the ascending reticular activating system. They studied acetylcholine, a neurotransmitter, by means of thinly sliced rat brain. Shute attributed the fruitful choice of chemical, which led to much further research, to the influence while he was a student of Wilhelm Feldberg. From the point of view of histochemistry, the technique built on the earlier work of George B. Koelle. Significant papers were published in Brain in 1967.

Shute became Reader in neuroanatomy at Cambridge in 1969, and the same year Professor of Histology in the Physiological Laboratory. Through colleagues there including Fergus W. Campbell he developed demonstrations of the visual phenomenon, a contingent aftereffect, known as the McCollough effect after its discoverer in 1965 Celeste McCollough.

== Later life ==
Shute married in 1980, as his third wife, Gay Robins. He retired as Cambridge professor in 1984, and collaborated in her work on the art of ancient Egypt. In her book Proportion and Style in Ancient Egyptian Art (1994) she wrote, in dedicating the book to him, that his "inquiries about Egyptian metrology in the early days of our marriage led me to reread Iversen's Canon and Proportion in Egyptian Art, and so set this whole work in motion." When she took a post at Emory University, he went with her, worked on Egyptian mathematics, and spent the rest of his life in the United States, dying in Atlanta, Georgia on 2 January 1999.

== Books ==
- The McCollough Effect, 1979
- The Rhind Mathematical Papyrus, 1987, with R. G. Robins

== Family ==
Shute married, firstly in 1947, Patricia Cameron Doran, daughter of Frank Herbert Doran, a stockjobber and committee member at Middlesex Hospital, who died in 1952. He married, secondly in 1954, Lydia May Harwood (Wendy), with whom he had three daughters and a son. They were divorced in 1980. Thirdly, in 1980 he married Rosemary Gay Robins, daughter of John Maurice Robins and his wife Alison Gerrish.
