= Charles Shute =

Charles Shute may refer to:

- Charles Shute (academic) (1917–1999), English physician and academic
- Sir Charles Cameron Shute (1816–1904), British army officer and politician
