= Hugh McCulloch (disambiguation) =

Hugh McCulloch (1808–1895) was an American statesman.

Hugh McCulloch may also refer to:

- Hugh McCulloch (poet) (1869–1902), American poet
- Hugh McCulloch, first editor of the Journal of the American Academy of Pediatrics
- USRC Hugh McCulloch, the name of more than one cutter of the United States Revenue Cutter service

== See also ==
- USCGC McCulloch
- USS McCulloch (1897)
