= McCulloch =

McCulloch is a Scottish surname, commonly found in Galloway, and usually associated with Clan MacCulloch. It may be etymologically related to the Irish surname McCullough.

Notable people with the surname include:

- Abbey McCulloch (born 1990), Australian netball player
- Alan McCulloch (politician), New Zealand politician
- Alan McLeod McCulloch (1907–1992), Australian cartoonist, painter, writer, art critic, art historian and gallery director
- Allan Riverstone McCulloch (1885–1925), Australian zoologist
- Andrew McCulloch (footballer) (fl. 1970–1985), British soccer player
- Andrew McCulloch (writer and actor) (born 1945), British television writer and actor
- Andrew McCulloch (drummer) (born 1946), British drummer for King Crimson and others
- Benjamin McCulloch (1811–1862), American Civil War soldier
- Bruce McCulloch (born 1961), Canadian actor and comedian
- Cheryl McCulloch (born 1990), Scottish footballer
- Christopher McCulloch (born 1971), American storyboard artist, writer, director, producer, and voice actor
- Derek McCulloch (comics) (born 1964), Canadian writer
- Duncan McCulloch (1893–1968), Scottish golfer
- Ellen McCulloch (1930–2005), Australian ornithologist and nature writer
- Ellen McCulloch-Lovell, American college administrator
- Gretchen McCulloch, Canadian Internet linguist
- Henry Eustace McCulloch (1816–1895), Confederate brigadier general in the American Civil War.
- Hugh McCulloch (1808–1895), American statesman
- Ian McCulloch (actor) (born 1939), Scottish actor
- Ian McCulloch (singer) (born 1959), English singer
- Ian McCulloch (snooker player) (born 1971), English snooker player
- James McCulloch (1819–1893), Australian statesman
- Jimmy McCulloch (1953–1979), Scottish guitarist with Wings and other bands
- John Ramsay McCulloch (1789–1864), Scottish economist
- Joseph McCulloch (c. 1887–1960), American college sports coach
- Ken McCulloch (1948–2024), British hotelier
- Kyle McCulloch (born 1961), Canadian writer for South Park
- Lee McCulloch (born 1978), Scottish footballer
- Richard McCulloch (born 1949), American author
- Robert P. McCulloch (1911–1977), American entrepreneur
- Roscoe C. McCulloch (1880–1959), American politician
- Warren Sturgis McCulloch (1898–1969), American neurophysiologist and cybernetician

== See also ==
- Clan MacCulloch
- McCullagh
- McCollough
- McCullough
