= Nerina Shute =

English writer and journalist (1908–2004)

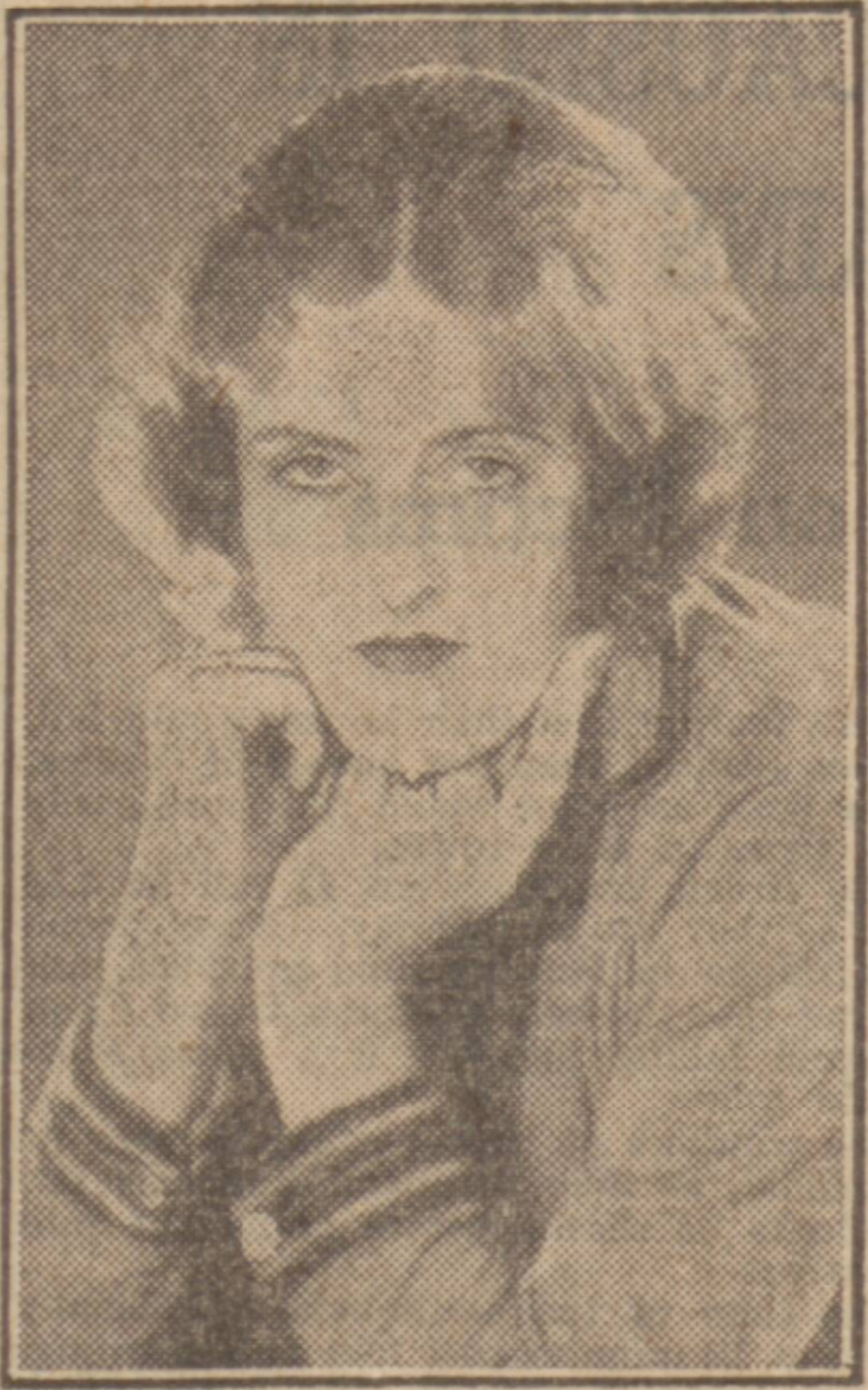
Shute in the early 1930s

Nerina Shute (17 July 1908 – 20 October 2004) was an English writer and journalist, described by the Sunday Times as "the amazingly colourful, brilliant and bisexual film critic". Twice married, she wrote always as Nerina Shute, and the surname is used below.

== Early life ==
She was born in Prudhoe, Northumberland. Her feckless father was Cameron Dinsdale Deane Shute (1868–1938), at one point a British Army major, and son of General Charles Cameron Shute. Her mother "Renie" Shute, née Amy Bertha Pepper Stavely, was from a prosperous family at Woldhurstlea, near Crawley, West Sussex and was the author under the name Mrs. Cameron Shute of a racy novel The Unconscious Bigamist; Nerina was the elder child of her second marriage.

Her parents having moved back to London, Nerina was brought up at 28 Cheyne Walk.

=== Education ===
Comparing her upbringing to that of her younger brother Charles Cameron Donald Shute (1917–1999), a physician and academic, Shute wrote "My brother had little love as a child, but a good education, I had plenty of love but little education." He was fostered by his unmarried godmother Kathleen Cross. Taken at age 12 to California by her mother, Nerina attended The Bishop's School in La Jolla. She also spent a short period at a high school in La Mesa. While Elva Corrie considers these school years, affording time for reading and contact with Hollywood, were positive for her, Bevis Hillier states they were lonely times. In Come into the Sunlight Shute explains the impact on her, from age about 14, of the local youth culture, which her father couldn't accept, though her mother took a complaisant line.

She sold her first story to McClure's Magazine at 16. After her return to England, she at some point read English at the University of London.

== In London ==
Nerina Shute at 19 was a typist in Devon, living with her father, dissatisfied and intent on journalism. She arrived in London in 1928. She found a place in the ranks of the "Hollywood interviewers": the female journalists and gossip columnists who publicised a Californian version of the New Woman. In private life, however, she had little interest in film, rejected American popular culture, and aimed at marriage.

Shute associated with Aimée Stuart and her husband Paul, moving into their Carlton House Terrace flat from her hostel in Lancaster Gate. Aimée hosted there a gay salon. Of London's lesbians, Shute noted: "They lied, cheated and had hysterics ... the code of homosexuality might be all right in theory but the people who practised it were intolerable." She rubbed shoulders with Walter Mycroft, who gave her access to Elstree Studios, and had enough influence that Carl Brisson bought her cocktails at the Savoy Hotel in search of a good review. In the era of quota quickies, besides purveying sensationalism, she argued for better publicity from film producers, and more commitment from film actors.

=== Gossip columnist ===
At Film Weekly, Shute had a position as "studio correspondent", and in it took on the role of enfant terrible. She was told: "You have a very impertinent pen" after calling Madeleine Carroll a "ruthless Madonna". She was given a rise and requested for more of the same; she provided it. With dismissals of the It girl set of the day—she took the expression to be invented by Elinor Glyn in Three Weeks. Her reaction to Charles Laughton's singing performance in the 1930 film revue Comets was that he was not a musical comedy actor and had a "husky" voice.

Alfred Hitchcock banned Shute from his sets, which didn't prevent her attending them dressed as a boy. A similar story about E. A. Dupont has her returning dressed as a rabbi. At the end of her life she told Matthew Sweet "People were frightened of me". She revealed that in The Informer, the 1929 talkie, Lya De Putti had had her voice dubbed. The actress, already troubled, did not make another film.

Shute in June 1929 assailed the work of director Dinah Shurey on The Last Post; Shurey brought a libel case and won. An article from December 1929, "Films Stars' Secrets Revealed", stung Jameson Thomas into a response, and caused much debate. Also in 1929, Shute's interview with John Stuart took on a confessional tone, as he revealed his well-guarded feelings about service in World War I. She made much of the death by fire of Nita Foy in the dressing room of Donald Calthrop, as the 1930 talkie Spanish Eyes was being made, interviewing Richard Cooper who subsequently had the room.

Shute's autobiographical novel, Another Man's Poison, had Rebecca West declare: "Miss Shute writes, not so much badly as barbarously, as if she had never read anything but a magazine." The Sunday Graphic hired her at ten guineas a week with by-line "the girl with the barbarous touch". Lord Beaverbrook also hired her, for the Daily Express. She worked for Beverley Baxter there, and felt ill-suited to her work as reporter.

== Cohabitation with Charles ==
As a young woman, Shute was troubled by the "sheer awkwardness of being a modern girl and, at the same time, a virgin". She went to The Little Club on Golden Square, one of Kate Meyrick's projects. She introduced Eric Whelpton, a friend of the 1930s, to the Clover Club on Sackville Street. She contemplated marriage to a man she called Charles; they met at a night club.

Charles had attended the University of Oxford, and was in his early thirties. The couple became engaged, around spring 1931. Nerina suggested they lived together before getting married. After a hiatus in the relationship, they made a trip to France together.

Shute's father Cammy towards the end of 1931 moved to Le Zoute in Belgium, as her mother Renie was expected to return from California. Charles, a doctor who had been struck off for performing an abortion, took a job in Liverpool as a commercial traveller. Shute moved there with him, wearing a sham wedding ring bought in March 1932. The relationship lasted six months. In July Shute published in the Sunday Pictorial an article "Buttons Mean a Lot in Marriage".

In the period after the breakup, she had a female lover she named as Josephine, a Roman Catholic who believed the Bible said nothing against lesbianism. This relationship lasted until her marriage in 1936.

== Film critic ==
Laraine Porter considers Iris Barry, C. A. Lejeune and the "talented and pugnacious" Nerina Shute as significant "popular female voices" of film criticism around the time of the advent of the sound film. On her return from her short stay in Liverpool, Shute got a job with the Sunday Referee, when an appeal to its editor Mark Goulden made her its film critic, the youngest in Fleet Street. It lasted for three years, until she reviewed unfavourably a film made by the paper's parent company, Gaumont-British. A boon companion for these years was John Betjeman, who was from 1933 the film critic for the Evening Standard.

In 1933, Shute recognised Gordon Conway as "a woman prophet of film fashions". That year, she made a Russian contact at a party, and at the beginning of 1934 started a trip to the Soviet Union, on which she met Vera Inber.

The Referee job ended in 1935, but Shute continued as a freelance. For the Sunday Dispatch, she secured an H. G. Wells interview that made the front page. It was her swansong as a journalist.

Disillusioned with Fleet Street, Shute then turned to publicity as the lesser of two evils. She accepted broadcast work offered to her on Radio Normandy (backed by Gaumont-British), which was sponsored by a soap-flake company. Then, through Goulden, Max Factor took her on as a part-time publicist.

== First marriage ==
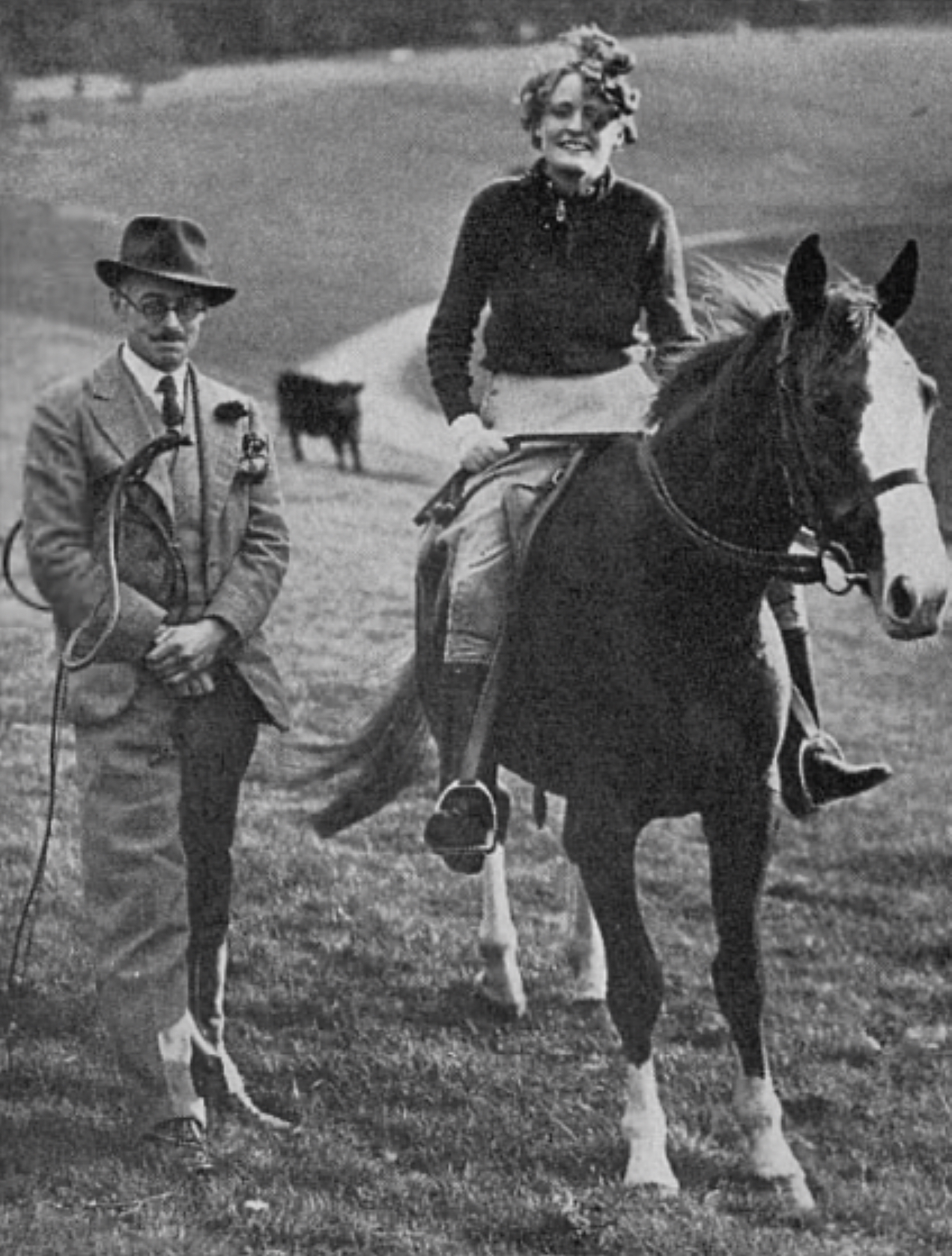
Wentworth Day (left) and Shute (right) in 1936.

Shute met the journalist James Wentworth Day. Despite his being a High Tory on the extreme right, she married him in 1936, as his second wife. They were divorced in 1943. Day wished her to give up her job with Max Factor, which instead became full time. They lived a busy social life, but quarrelled about politics. At this time, Nerina went fox-hunting; she was also photographed with the Australian stockwhip expert Col. Holman-Jones.

Day earned money as a journalist, but did not live within his income, and Shute left him in August 1937, going to stay with Aimée Stuart.

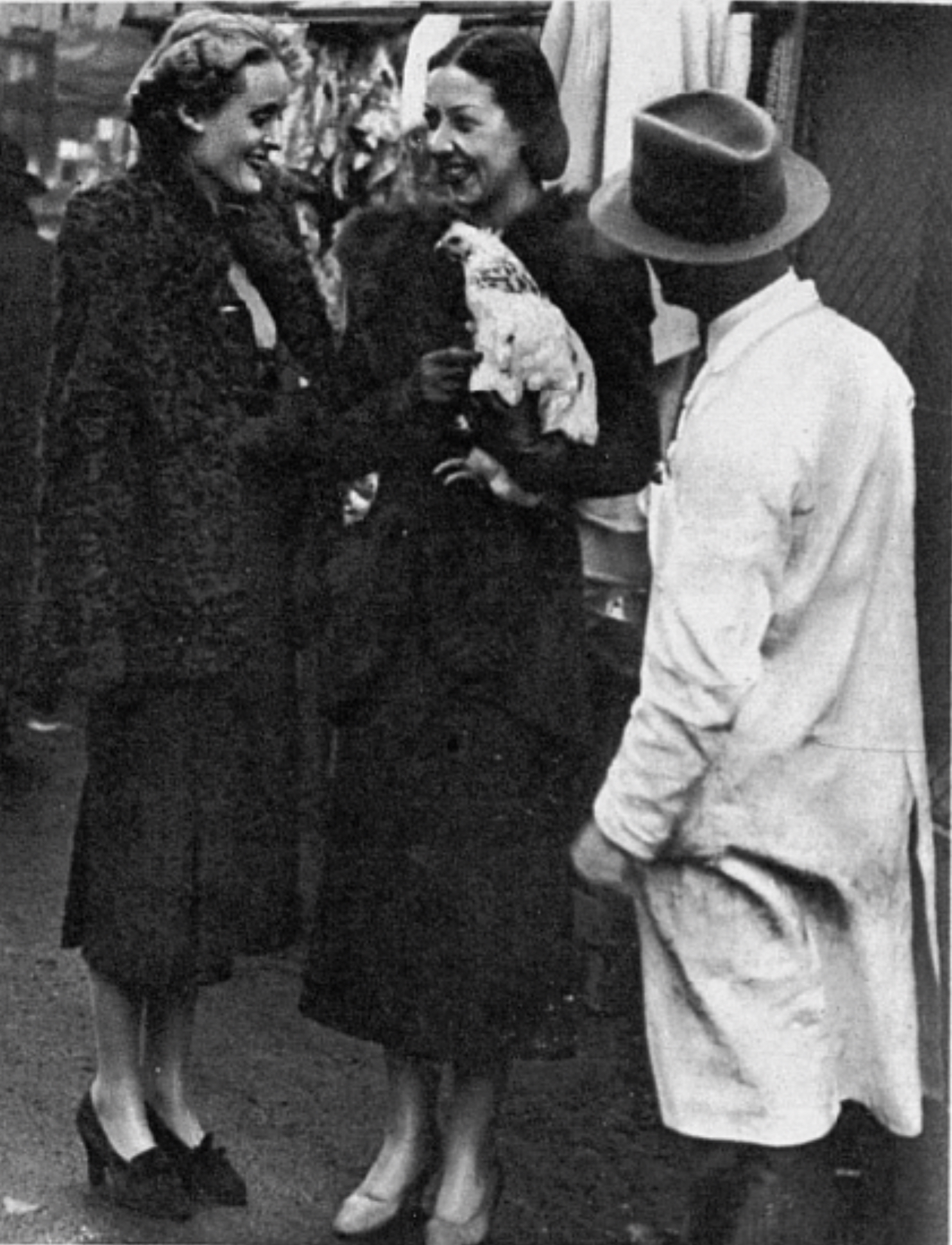
Shute (left) with The Prodigal Mother actress Ellen Pollock (right) in 1937.

Shute's play The Prodigal Mother was performed at the Q Theatre on 17 January 1938, put on by Jack de Leon. The cast included Nancy O'Neil, Winifred Evans, Ellen Pollock, Jack Livesey and Mignon O'Doherty. The producer was Frank Collins, who had worked for C. B. Cochran. Her husband approached Cochran in the hope of a transfer to the West End, but without success. Shute did have further contact with Edward Leadlay, Cochran's press publicist, in 1938. He was involved in setting up an Argus Press monthly, Plus Living, where she was a contributor with James Agate and S. P. B. Mais.

Visiting her mother in Rottingdean, Sussex, in early 1939, Shute met two women: "Andy" Sharpe (Dorothy Anderton Sharpe 1903–1978); and, somewhat older, Helen Patricia Mayo. They were respectively a gynaecologist and one of the first female dental surgeons. Nerina had an affair with Helen, and moved into Andy and Helen's house in Portland Place, in August 1939.

After war broke out in September of that year, Shute joined a North London ambulance team.

== Second marriage ==
In 1940 Shute was interviewed for BBC Radio by broadcaster Howard Marshall. After his first marriage to Ruth ffolliott Shackle ended in divorce, they were married on 10 March 1944.

The marriage ended after Nerina confessed to him, during a row on New Year's Eve, 1953, that she was having an affair with their French maid. Marshall was married again, in 1954, to Jasmine Bligh, as her third husband.

== Later life ==
After a brief spell in London working for Andy Sharpe, Shute went after her mother died in 1958 to live with her widower, Noel Sparrow, in Sussex, of much the same age. They moved to a London flat in Cadogan Place.

Shute fell for the ballroom dancer Phyllis Haylor (1904–1981), and Haylor was a part of her life for 22 years, until her death in 1981. Sparrow died in 1967, and Nerina and Phyllis then bought a cottage in Hertfordshire. At a later point they moved back to London. Frederick Raphael, whose father Cedric (died 1979) had been Haylor's dancing partner in the 1920s, knew Nerina Marshall, as she was called, towards the end of that period. Nerina was living in Manor Fields, an estate on Putney Hill; she and Haylor had moved to Putney in 1979.

Shute helped as a secretary at a hostel for unmarried mothers (girls with "syncopated moralities", she said); and later volunteered with The Samaritans.

In 1989, Shute was introduced by a friend to the artist Jocelyn Williams who became her lover and, as Shute's long life neared its end, her devoted carer. With the publication of Passionate Friendships in 1992, she was finally able to be open about her own bisexuality. "For many years I have managed to keep my secrets to myself," she wrote, "protecting the men and women I have loved. Now all my loved ones are dead and no longer vulnerable. No one is left who might be hurt or damaged by these confessions unless it is myself."

== Books ==
- Another Man's Poison (1931), novel
- We Mixed Our Drinks (1945), memoir
- Poet Pursued (1951), about Shelley
- Victorian Love Story (1954), about Rossetti
- Favourite Books for Boys and Girls (1955), on children's reading habits
- Come into The Sunlight (1957), memoir of her mother
- Malady of Love, (1962)
- Georgian Lady (1958), about Fanny Burney
- The Escapist Generations (1973) My London Story
- London Villages (1977), history of London
- More London Villages (1981)
- The Royal Family and the Spencers, (1986), biography
- Passionate Friendships (1992), memoir
