= Robert McCullough =

Robert, Rob or Bob McCullough may refer to:

- Bob McCullough (sports administrator) (1931–2017), Australian sports administrator
- Bob McCullough (American football) (born 1940), American football player
- Bob McCullough (basketball), American basketball player
- Bob McCullough (cricketer) (1943–2020), New Zealand cricketer
- Robert McCullough (born August 6, 1960), Australian former singer
- Rob McCullough (born 1977), American mixed martial artist

== See also ==
- Bob McCullogh (1892–1972), English footballer
- Robert McCulloch (disambiguation)
