= Deng Adut =

Australian lawyer and refugee advocate, formerly of South Sudan

Deng Thiak Adut (born 1984) is a defence lawyer and refugee advocate in Western Sydney, Australia, and a former child soldier from South Sudan. His story is told in a popular short video by Western Sydney University, where he earned his law degree. He was named the 2017 New South Wales Australian of the Year.

== Early life ==
Adut was born in 1984 near Malek, a small fishing village in South Sudan near White Nile River. He is a member of the Dinka people. One of eight children, he had a happy early childhood spent with his family at their banana farm.

At the age of around six or seven, (Note: 6 according to various news sources or 7 according to Adut's autobiography) Adut was taken from his mother and marched for 33 days to Ethiopia along with 30 other child conscripts. During the march, some boys died of starvation or thirst, others were shot by bandits, and others attacked by wild animals. The boys were forced to fight for the Sudan People's Liberation Army in the Second Sudanese Civil War. They were brainwashed and given daily doses of khat, a herbal stimulant drug popular in East Africa. Adut was taught to use an AK-47 assault rifle and other weapons. He witnessed many atrocities, including people dying from dehydration and a grenade explosion and children committing suicide. At 12 years of age he was shot in the testicles and back and almost bled to death.

In 1995, Adut's older half-brother, John Mac, smuggled Adut out of Sudan at night in a truck under sacks of corn. Adut spent 18 months in a refugee camp in Kenya. The United Nations granted both brothers refugee status, and in 1998 when Adut was 14, Australia granted both boys a visa.

== In Australia ==
Adut reached Australia in 1998 at age 14 due to sponsorship by Christian aid workers Bob and Christine Harrison. He was part of the third family to come to Australia as Sudanese refugees. He had little education and did not know English, and initially felt isolated as a member of the only black family in Blacktown, Sydney. At 15 Adut taught himself English, in part by using The Wiggles children's television program and the Bible as examples, though Adut is an avowed atheist. He worked myriad part-time jobs including making concrete, carpet, windows and doors, catching chickens, working in a meat factory, working in a petrol station, and mowing lawns. He became an Australian citizen in 2001.

In 2001, Adut completed a TAFE course equivalent to a high school certificate. Subsequently he completed an Advanced Diploma in Accounting at TAFE. He rejected an offer to study at Macquarie University following racist remarks by Macquarie law professor Drew Fraser, instead accepting admission to Western Sydney University on a scholarship. The first in his family to earn a university degree, Adut graduated with a Bachelor of Laws, and worked for Grace Legal and then LN Legal. Along with solicitor Joseph Correy, Adut co-founded AC Law Group and is still a partner, supporting youths of Western Sydney's Sudanese community as a defence lawyer. He performs much of his work pro bono.

Adut founded the John Mac Foundation in honour of his half-brother, John Mac Acuek, who helped Adut escape South Sudan and died in 2014 while leading an effort to rescue South Sudanese civilians from ongoing conflict. The Foundation provides higher education scholarships to students from refugee backgrounds. Adut sponsors "Savannah Pride", a Blacktown basketball team.

In 2017 Adut condemned the ban on immigration to the United States ordered by US President Donald Trump. He said, "The culture of punishing the innocent and weak countries has got to stop. It's not stopping wars; it's creating them. It's creating economic deprivation for the local people; the victims are the poor, the ones that have no skills, the refugees."

Adut completed a Master of Laws in Criminal Prosecution at Wollongong University and has a scholarship to return to Western Sydney University for a second Master of Laws in International Governance. He ultimately aims to return to South Sudan to prosecute those responsible for the conscription of child soldiers.

== Recognition ==
In 2015 Western Sydney University produced a short video about Adut's life up to his 2012 reunion with his mother, who was still living in Adut's childhood home in South Sudan. Viewed over 2 million times on YouTube, Adut says it "has helped others understand the horrors that see people seek asylum in safer countries", and helped him promote the importance of education.

On 27 October 2016 Adut was awarded the 2016 Law Society of New South Wales President's Medal. Society president Gary Ulman said the award is "testament to [Adut's] personal and professional achievements over a number of years, and to his outstanding contribution to the community of Western Sydney."

Also in 2016 Adut was named New South Wales Australian of the Year for 2017. The announcement was made by the state Premier Mike Baird, who said Adut "has channelled his success into helping hundreds of people in the state's Sudanese community navigate their way through the Australian legal system."

An acrylic and oil on linen portrait of Adut titled Deng by artist Nick Stathopoulos won the People's Choice Award in the 2016 Archibald Prize at the Art Gallery of New South Wales.

== Selected publications ==
- Adut, Deng (2016). Songs of a War Boy. Sydney, N.S.W: Hachette Australia. ISBN 978-0-7336-3651-6.
