= Donald McCullough =

Donald McCullough may refer to:

- Donald McCullough (broadcaster) (1901–1978), question-master of The Brains Trust
- Donald McCullough (minister) (born 1949), former president of San Francisco Theological Seminary
