= Mrs. Cameron Shute =

English novelist

Mrs. Cameron Shute (1878–1958) (birth name Amy Bertha Ernestine Pepper-Staveley) was an English novelist. After World War I, she left her family and spent a period in California, where she was president of a mining company at Descanso, and also was involved in an attempt to set up an all-female Hollywood production company, both ventures being largely fruitless. She was married six times; once bigamously, Shute being her second married name. The novelist Nerina Shute was her daughter.

== Background ==
Her father was George Augustus Pepper-Staveley (died 1890). He was the son of John Pepper of the Royal Indian Navy and his wife Ann. His parents were married at Dover in 1820, and were on their way to India when their ship the Blenden Hall was wrecked on Inaccessible Island in early 1821. The survivors lived off the land for a period before being taken on a whaler to Tristan da Cunha. In January 1822 they were able to take a passage to the Cape of Good Hope in the Nerina, Captain David Lauchlan.

George Pepper, who added to his surname in 1873, was a Haileybury College graduate who was in India in the Bengal Civil Service from 1846 to 1873, becoming a judge at Jessor. He married firstly, in 1859, Lady Helen Ogilvy, daughter of David Ogilvy, 9th Earl of Airlie. They had two sons and a daughter; she died in 1862.

Pepper married secondly, in 1868, Jessie Louisa Macfarlan (died 1925), daughter of Donald Macfarlan M.D. Macfarlan was from the Macfarlane family of Ledard on Loch Ard. He married Mary Ann Rooke (born 1837), daughter of Richard Ludlam Rooke (died 1838).

Pepper-Staveley on his return to England settled at Woldhurstlea, Ifield, West Sussex, which he bought with some land in 1873. His mother Ann died there in 1882. Amy Bertha Ernestine was the youngest of four daughters of his second marriage; she also had a brother, John Donald, who died in 1896.

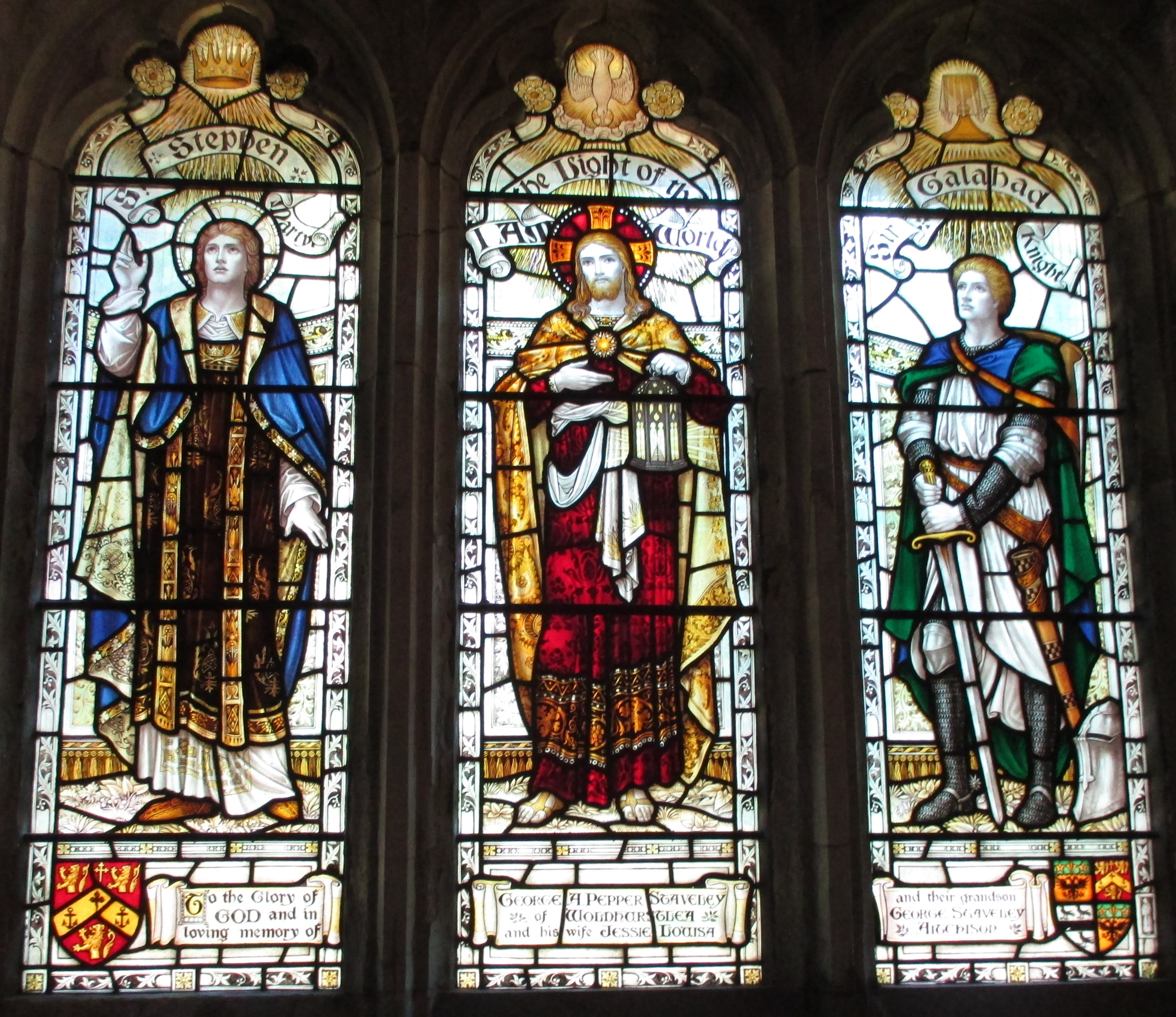
Memorial window to George and Jessie Pepper-Staveley in St Margaret's Church, Ifield

== Life ==
Amy Pepper-Staveley, known in the family as "Renie", had a conventional, staid Victorian upbringing at Woldhurstlea near Crawley, Sussex, with a coming-out party at age 17. To take her mind off a local suitor, Alfred Saillard, she was given an introduction to London society by Mrs Dodgson (Agnes Dodgson née Jenkins, married in 1859 to John Crawford Dodgson, a judge at Jessor in India who retired in 1869), at 38 Roland Gardens.

=== First marriage ===
Amy married in 1898 Ernest Henry Brass, an army officer. The son of the Rev. Henry Brass, vicar of Redhill, he was born in 1869, was educated at Uppingham School and matriculated at Clare College, Cambridge in 1888. They became engaged after a brief acquaintance on the hunting field.

Brass served as a lieutenant in the 1st Battalion, East Yorkshire Regiment. After the marriage they lived for a period at Tickton Grange, near Victoria Barracks, Beverley in the East Riding of Yorkshire. They hunted together three or four days a week in the season, and were visitors at Tranby Croft.

With the outbreak of the Second Anglo-Boer War, Brass was posted to South Africa. He served in Cape Town as a Transport Officer. He wrote to Amy, in London with an infant son Jackie, saying she should join him there. After she had done that, towards the end of the war, Brass joined the British forces at the front, and she returned to England. He was drowned in the Wilge River in November 1901.

In a promiscuous milieu in Cape Town, Amy Brass was labelled a prude by Claude Champion de Crespigny, who had kissed her on a short railway trip, causing her to flee him at Rondebosch. Ernest Brass, she had good reason to believe, had a married mistress there, Gracie Middleton.

=== Second marriage ===
Back in England, Amy Brass spent time with her mother at Egerton House, Berkhamsted. Lady Blanche Hozier, wife of Sir Henry Hozier, was a family connection through the Ogilvys, and from about 1901 lived in Berkhamsted, also on the High Street. Amy struck up a friendship with the teenage Clementine Hozier.

Amy then married secondly, in 1902, another soldier, Cameron Dinsdale (or Dimsdale) Deane Shute, son of General Charles Cameron Shute. A close friend of Ernest Brass, he had pursued her by letter from Cape Town, continuing after Brass's death. She had a daughter Nerina (born 1908) by this second marriage, as well as a son, Charles Cameron Donald Shute (1917–1999), a physician and academic. She separated from Cameron Shute around 1919.

Cameron Shute was known as "Cammy" in the family. Never interested in career, he became a stockbroker after the marriage. They lived first in London at 86 Gloucester Terrace. Amy was presented at court, wearing Shute family diamonds. They then moved, ending near Woldhurstlea at a large house, The Craigan, Ifield.

When his business partner decamped, Cammy Shute was left with heavy financial losses. The Shutes sold most of their possessions, still leaving some debt held by a friend, Eric Gordon; Renie Shute sold her horses and other possessions to make ends meet.

To economise, the Shutes lived for what was a happy period in the marriage on Cader Idris in North Wales. Then Cammy's mother found him a job as personal secretary to Henry William Swan, a retired shipbuilder at Prudhoe Hall who was intending to go into politics. Nerina was born at Prudhoe, according to an obituarist, though other sources say the birth was in North Wales. Swan died in 1908, shortly after the appointment, but Cammy Shute was kept on by his widow for a time at the Hall, to run the estate.

When Cammy Shute inherited a legacy, the family's fortunes were restored. They moved to Cheyne Walk in Chelsea, London.

Sir Home Gordon, 12th Baronet was related to Cammy Shute; General Shute's maternal grandmother Charlotte Gordon was a daughter of the 7th Baronet Gordon of Embo (called 8th Baronet in Who Was Who). Home Gordon's wife Edith encouraged Amy Shute to read Henrik Ibsen, giving her an edition of his works. Cammy was anti-intellectual and philistine: he had strong objections to the sculptor Basil Gotto, their neighbour in Cheyne Walk.

=== Period in the United States: Hollywood and Descanso ===
At the end of 1920, when her daughter Nerina was 12 and she was 42, Amy Shute left England. With Nerina she went to Hollywood, via New York, a voyage intended to gain a film adaptation of her first novel. Thomas H. Ince proposed to do so.

Her son Charles, known in the family as Donald, was left with Kathleen Cross, his godmother, and was fostered apart from his parents. Wealthy and unmarried, she sent Charles to Eton.

In New York, Amy had an introduction from Lord Erroll, and saw family friends. On the West Coast she knew the actor and journalist Ronald Blathwayt, to whom she owed an invitation to Hollywood. Blaythwayt pursued her, successfully, with love letters. She met there the writer Elinor Glyn, a distant connection of the Shutes, and explained a wish to earn a living as a screen writer.

==== In film ====
In 1923 Shute, by this time going by "Aides", was recruited to a project of Lule Warrenton to set up an all-woman film company. She was taken on, with two other graduates of Palmer Photoplay, a corporation running writing courses nationally. While Palmer Photoplay operated as a correspondence school, it had input at this period from Lois Weber, from 1921 a mentor encouraging women to write screenplays.

Trade press stories in 1923, in Camera! and Story World and Photodramatist, announced production in train in 1923 by the Warrenton company, at the Sawyer-Lubin Studios in San Diego. Shute was named as a writer, with Katherine Chesnaye as a short-story writer (née Woodill, she was married to Major Christian Purefoy Chesnaye), and Edith Kendall. Nothing however resulted. After an announcement in August that Bartered Flesh directed by Warrenton was filming that week, nothing more was heard. In 1929 Nerina Shute reviewed The Last Post by British director Dinah Shurey in savage terms in Film Weekly, writing "It is pathetically obvious that women can't produce films", and giving rise to a successful libel action by Shurey.

==== Gold mine ====
Meanwhile, Shute had an affair with a mining engineer from South Africa, and bought into a gold mine at Descanso. The engineer, who was married, was named as Captain Mallaby by Nerina Shute writing in 1958, but that was not his real surname according to a later work. According to Bevis Hillier, the couple were married, bigamously because she was still married to Cammy; on the other hand, Nerina Shute's account conflicts with that one, with a later marriage to an Irishman "Black Jack", again bigamous in English law because Renie Shute had obtained a Californian divorce not recognised by English courts. Matthew Sweet, with Nerina as source, names him as Jack Breene, an Irish film actor. (The 1931 marriage to Cooper mentioned below is therefore called the third by Burke.)

In 1922, the Descanso Mining Syndicate issued shares to C. E. Matheis, J. A. Tregelles and Amy B. Shute. Cammy Shute spent some time in California at the mine, according to his daughter Nerina, who was then attending briefly a high school in La Mesa. There was gold and silver. Cammy departed, and shortly after that, Captain Mallaby was killed in a car accident. By 1924, the syndicate had leased the mine to the Descanso Mining Company, president B. F. Stanwood.

The mine syndicate was in 1926 given with Cammy Shute's name as president. In 1927, the syndicate president was given as A. B. E. Shute. The mine was reported to have an incline shaft of depth 230 feet to the Magdalena vein.

== Later life ==
On her mother's death, in 1925, Amy Shute became joint tenant, with her three sisters, of Woldhurstlea. Her third husband, married in 1931, was according to Burke's Landed Gentry Clyde Cooper Sellers. Cooper was an American Southerner, a contact through the Californian mine. He died in a mining accident, around the time of the Abdication crisis; Amy married again, shortly, to Arthur White, a bank manager in Crawley.

Her last husband was Charles Noel Blair Sparrow, son of Cecil Blair Sparrow of Preen Manor, Shropshire and his wife Cara Mary Evan-Thomas. They married in 1945, when Amy's surname was White.

== Works ==
- The Unconscious Bigamist (1911), John Long Ltd. A review in The Sketch said:

This is a fantastically unpleasant tale of a lady with bright, perfumed hair and eyes which are deep pools of blue loveliness full of unexpressed emotion. She had also a small, shapely head and a proud, fearless carriage. We have met her before.[...]

The Outlook gave a plot summary:

A young woman goes out to join her husband at Capetown during the Boer war. The husband is busy when she arrives, attending to transport, and after a hearty greeting, hands her over to the young and good-looking officer with whom she has been friendly on the voyage.[...]

Nerina Shute mentioned a favourable review in T. P.'s Weekly. She summarised the plot as

a passionate and soulful story of a man's deep love for a married woman among the gaiety of the Mount Nelson Hotel; staff dinners; parties at Kenilworth races; polo and flirting.

She also considered that the book's publication started the deterioration in her parents' marriage.

- The Cross Roads (1917), Eveleigh Nash Co., "mainly the story of a girl who forsakes convent life for the stage, and after exciting experiences and trials is happily married."
