= James Wentworth Day =

British writer (1899-1983)

James Wentworth Day (21 April 1899 – 5 January 1983) was a British author and broadcaster, a promoter of Agrarian Right politics and essentially a High Tory. He lived for most of his life in East Anglia. He had a particular interest in wild fowling, and at one time owned Adventurers' Fen, a piece of marshland in Cambridgeshire. He was also a ghost hunter, and wrote several books about this interest. He may be remembered best for his journey around the farms of East Anglia on horseback during World War II, as detailed in his book Farming Adventure (later reprinted with the title Wartime Ride), while for many years he was associated with the magazine East Anglian.

== Early life ==
Born in Exning, Suffolk he was educated at Newton College in Newton Abbot before seeing active service in World War I. He became a journalist after his war service, working for Daily Express newspapers and the magazine Country Life (as well as other sporting publications). He edited the Illustrated Sporting and Dramatic News. He also became personal assistant to Lucy, Lady Houston and for a time-shared some of her extreme ideas endorsing Benito Mussolini, although he was suspicious of Adolf Hitler. He became a propaganda adviser to the Egyptian government in 1938 and spent the Second World War as a correspondent in France and as the Near East correspondent of the BBC until he was invalided during 1943.

== Post-war activity ==
Day had a confrontation with Labour Party chairman Harold Laski in 1945, putting questions to him at a meeting in Newark, Nottinghamshire which resulted in Laski seemingly endorsing socialism by means of violent revolution. As such he was a major witness in the Laski libel lawsuit of 1946.

During 1950 and 1951 Day was an unsuccessful Conservative candidate for the constituency of Hornchurch, now in Greater London but then in Essex, and often spoke on behalf of the Tory cause at elections. He worked for a number of British newspapers, had senior jobs with the magazines The Field and Country Life, and was both owner and editor of the periodical Saturday Review.

On 6 November 1968 Day addressed the Conservative Monday Club on several issues commencing with a defence of the House of Lords after Harold Wilson's White Paper for its reform. He also criticized "unrealistically high" Death Duties and condemned land speculators, saying that it was to the shame of the Conservative Party that they had never implemented an Agricultural Charter. He condemned the Labour Government's Agricultural Training Board which, he said was "vehemently opposed by the majority of farmers" and which included on its board of twelve, three men from Transport House. "What", he asked, "was their knowledge of agriculture and what was their purpose on the board?".

== Television career ==
Wentworth Day briefly achieved minor public notice during 1957 and 1958, when he performed as the resident reactionary in Daniel Farson's television series for the company Associated-Rediffusion, most famously Out of Step and People in Trouble. Farson stated that he did not agree with Wentworth Day's sentiments, which were perceived as racist and xenophobic at the time. For instance, in the programme People in Trouble during a discussion concerning mixed marriages, Wentworth Day referred to "coffee-coloured little imps" and claimed that black people must be "inferior" because "in many cases their grandfathers were eating each other". Farson usually chuckled along with the comments and ended them with a remark similar to "I completely disagree with you, but at least you say what you really feel".

However, Wentworth Day was dismissed from Farson's series after he claimed, while contributing to a programme concerning transvestism, that all gay people should be hanged. At the time, homosexual acts were illegal under the Sexual Offences Act 1956, but not punished with death. Farson, who was gay, was afraid Wentworth Day might get him into legal trouble and insisted that the programme be omitted, theoretically because the Independent Television Authority would ban it anyway.

Wentworth Day continued to write until soon before his death. He also endorsed traditional farming methods and opposed the use of pesticides; these opinions were expressed in his book Poison on the Land (1957).

== Personal life ==
During his early years, Wentworth Day had several unsuccessful engagements, as well as two failed marriages, to Helen Alexia Gardom (1925–1934) and Nerina Shute (1936–1943). He married New Zealander Marion McLean in 1943 and the couple had one daughter together, remaining married until his death.

James Wentworth Day died in Ingatestone, Essex aged 83. At his funeral, the huntsmen of six local packs bore his coffin as pallbearers.

== Books ==
Note: The list below is probably incomplete and some of the dates may be inaccurate.

- The Boys' Life of Sir Henry Segrave (1930) co-written with Malcolm Campbell
- Speed: The Authentic Life of Sir Malcolm Campbell (1931)
- Kaye Don, the Man (1934)
- The Modern Fowler: With a Guide to Some of the Principal Costal Wildfowling Resorts of To-day (1934; revised & enlarged 1949)
- King George V as a Sportsman (1935)
- A Falcon on St Paul's (1935)
- Sporting Adventure (1937)
- The Dog in Sport (1938)
- Sport in Egypt (1938)
- Farming Adventure: A Thousand Miles Through England on a Horse (1943)
- Harvest Adventure (1946)
- Gamblers' Gallery (1948)
- Wild Wings and Some Footsteps (1948)
- The English Counties Illustrated (1948) the chapters on Bedfordshire, Lincolnshire and Rutland
- Coastal Adventure (1949)
- Marshland Adventure (1950)
- Broadland Adventure (1951)
- The New Yeomen of England (1952)
- The Modern Shooter (1952)
- Norwich and the Broads (1953)
- A History of the Fens (1954)
- The Wisest Dogs in the World: Some Account of the Longshaw Sheepdog Trials Association (1954)
- Here Are Ghosts And Witches (1954)
- They Walk The Wild Places (1956)
- Poison on the Land: The War on Wild Life, And Some Remedies (1957)
- The Angler's Pocket Book (1957)
- The Dog Lover's Pocket Book (1957)
- A Ghost Hunter's Game Book (1958)
- Lady Houston, DBE: The Woman Who Won the War (1958)
- British Animals of the Wild Places (1960)
- British Birds of the Wild Places (1961)
- HRH Princess Marina, Duchess of Kent: The First Authentic Life Story (1962)
- Portrait of the Broads (1967)
- The Queen Mother's Family Story (1967)
- In Search of Ghosts (1969)
- History of the Fens (1970)
- Rum Owd Boys (1974)
- Norwich Through The Ages (1976)
- King's Lynn and Sandringham Through The Ages (1977)
- Garland of Hops (1978)
- The James Wentworth Day Book of Essex (1979)

== Quote ==
"I confess it. I do not like modern furniture or much of modern architecture, less or none of modern art and little of modern literature. I am, of course, an antediluvian, a reactionary, an out-of-date or, as I prefer it, a rural romanticist."
