= Howard Marshall (broadcaster) =

English rugby union player & broadcaster

Howard Marshall as a war correspondent

Howard Percival Marshall (22 August 1900 at Sutton, Surrey – 27 October 1973 (aged 73)) achieved distinction in several fields, but is best remembered as a pioneering commentator for live broadcasts of state occasions and sporting events — in particular cricket Test matches — for BBC radio during the 1930s.

== Life ==
Marshall was the only son of publisher Percival Marshall and Zoe Beatrice (née Bridger). After Haileybury, he went to Oriel College, Oxford, winning a rugby union Blue. He captained the Harlequins rugby team. He trained as a journalist, and joined the BBC in 1927. Within ten years he had become the premier radio Outside Broadcast commentator, being chosen to describe the coronation of King George VI and Queen Elizabeth in 1937, as well as that of Queen Elizabeth II in 1953.

The live broadcasting of cricket had begun, in a limited fashion, in 1927, with ‘eye witness’ summaries by Pelham Warner, as it was generally thought that ball-by-ball commentary would not work for a game as slow as cricket. However, this began to change around 1932 when the influential Seymour de Lotbiniere ('Lobby’) - who became BBC's Head of Outside Broadcasting in 1935 - began to believe that ball-by-ball commentary could make compelling radio. In 1934, he got Marshall to begin commentating on cricket, rather than just giving reports. Marshall was a great success, the poet Edmund Blunden writing: "And then on the air, Mr Howard Marshall makes every ball bowled, every shifting of a fieldsman so fertile with meaning that any wireless set may make a subtle cricket student of anybody."

He commentated on some of the "Victory Tests" in 1945, assisted by Rex Alston, but had moved on to higher things in the BBC when real Test cricket resumed the following year.

Nine of his cricket commentaries over the period 1934 to 1945 survive in the BBC archives, including his famous description of Len Hutton at The Oval in 1938 surpassing Don Bradman's record score of 334 in Anglo-Australian Tests.

As well as cricket, he also commentated on boxing and rugby. He wrote cricket and rugby reports for the Daily Telegraph for some years. He provided the commentary on two documentary short films, and was the voice of a radio cricket commentator in the feature film A Matter of Life and Death.

During World War II he became the first Director of Public Relations at the Ministry of Food from 1940 to 1943, then Director of War Reporting and a war correspondent. He famously broadcast from a Normandy beach immediately after the D-Day landings. A snippet of the outside broadcast he made on the VE Day celebrations in London survives.

He married twice (including Nerina Shute) and found time to work as a Director of Personnel and Public Relations in the steel industry, to write several books on sport, housing and exploration, amongst other subjects, and to co-found the magazines Angling Times and Trout and Salmon.

== Bibliography ==
His books included:

- Rugger Stories (editor), Putnam, 1932.
- Cricket Stories (editor), Putnam, 1933.
- Edward the Eighth - Our King (introduction), Allied Newspapers Ltd, 1936
- Under Big Ben: English Reveries (author) Longmans, Green and Co, 1937
- Over to Tunis: The First Eyewitness Story of the Tunisian Campaign, Eyre and Spottiswoode, 1943.
- Oxford v Cambridge: The story of the university rugby match, Clarke & Cockeran, 1951.
- Coronation Day, 1953, Hutchinson, 1953.
- Reflections on a River, HF & G Witherby, 1967, ISBN 978-0-85493-000-5.
