= Robert McCulloch =

Robert McCulloch may refer to:

- Robert McCulloch (footballer) (1900-1964), Scottish footballer also known as Bob McCulloch, see List of AFC Bournemouth players (25–99 appearances)
- Robert P. McCulloch (1911–1977), American entrepreneur
- Robert McCulloch (priest) (born 1946), Australian clergyman
- Bob McCulloch (prosecutor) (born 1951), American lawyer

== See also ==
- Robert McCullough (disambiguation)
