= Clan MacCulloch =

Lowland Scottish clan

- Motto: Vi et animo (Latin for 'By strength and courage')

Profile
- Region: Lowlands
- District: Galloway
- Clan MacCulloch no longer has a chief, and is an armigerous clan
- Historic seat: Myreton Castle;Cardoness Castle.
- Last Chief: John McCulloch of Barholm.
- Died: 1851
Clan branches
McCulloch of Myreton
McCulloch of Killasser
McCulloch of Ardwell
McCulloch of Cardoness
McCulloch of Torhouse
McCulloch of Barholm
McCulloch of Drummorrell
McCulloch of Inshanks and Mule
McCulloch of Nether Ardwall

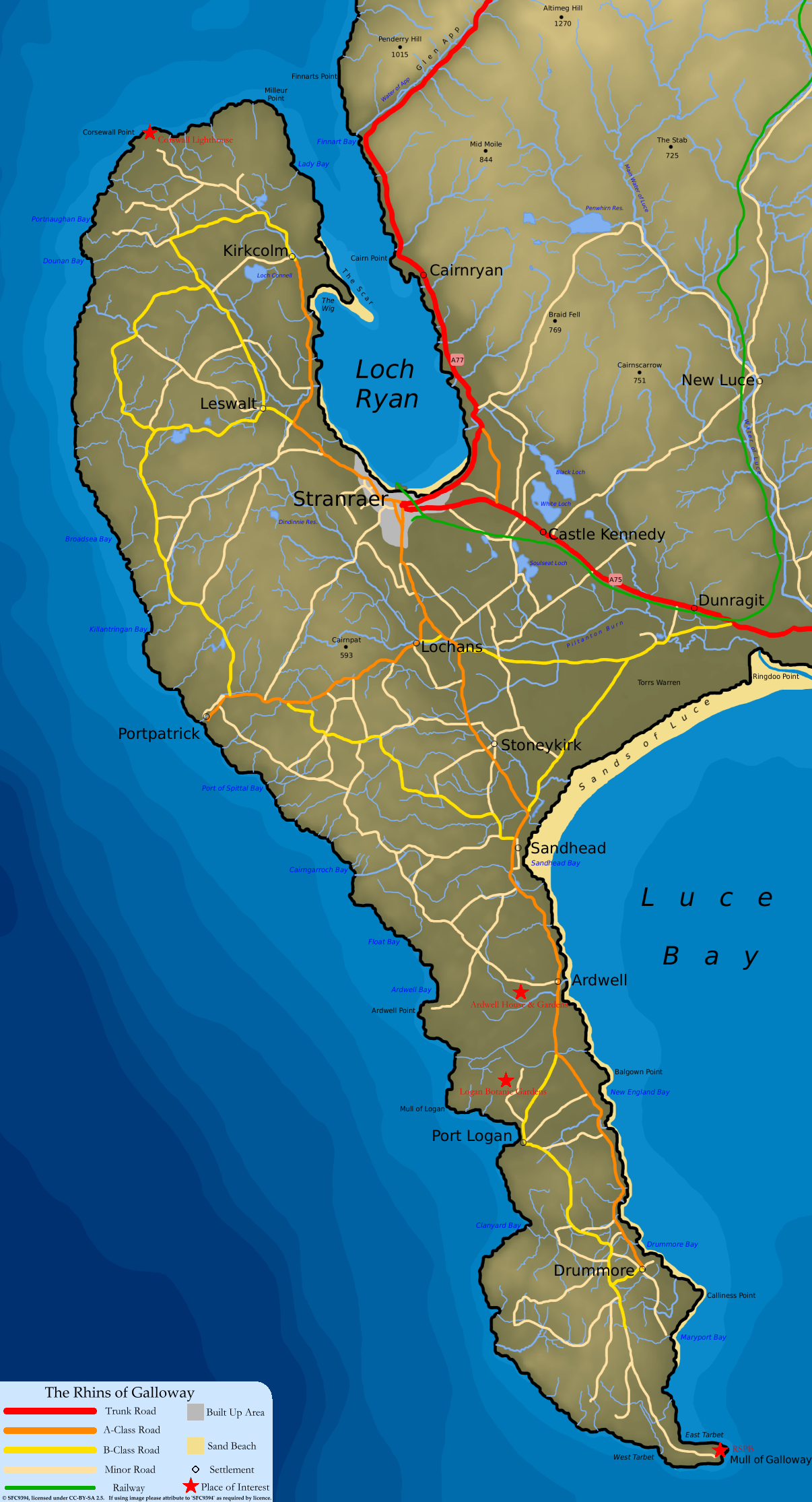
Map of the Rhinns of Galloway

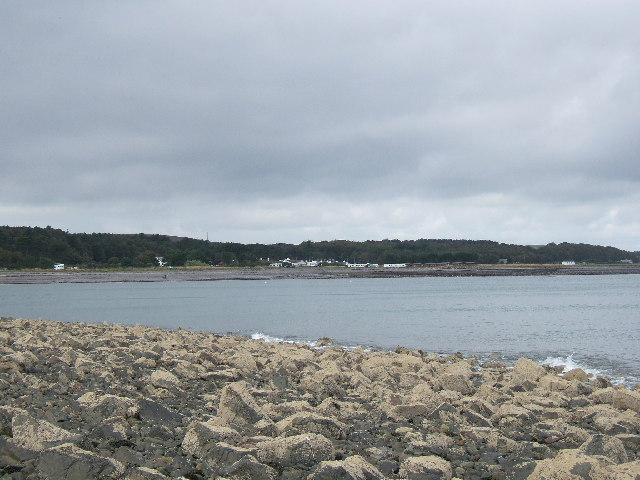
Chapel Rossan Bay looking across to Ardwell village, Wigtownshire.

The origins of Clan MacCulloch are unknown, but there is a consensus that the family was one of the most ancient families of Galloway, Scotland, and a leading medieval family in that region. Despite the obscurity of the early history of the clan, the history and genealogies of the family are well documented in Walter Jameson McCulloch's History of the Galloway Families of McCulloch, which provides extensive footnotes for original Scottish charters, correspondence, and other primary source documentation. The latter provides family history for the following lines: Myretoun, Ardwell, Killasser, Torhouse, Drummorrell, Inshanks and Mule, Torhousekie, Cardiness, Barholm, Kirkclaugh, Auchengool, and Ardwall (Nether Ardwall).

Clan MacCulloch is a Lowland Scottish clan. As it no longer has a clan chief, it is an armigerous clan. The last chief recognized by the Court of Lord Lyon was John McCulloch of Barholm who died in 1851.

== History ==
=== Origins ===
The name McCulloch is of Celtic origin and is found mainly in Galloway and Wigtownshire. The name is in the format of a Gaelic patronym with "mac" meaning son followed by a name. However, the origin of that name is a subject of debate.

The first record of the name McCulloch was a 1285 transaction with respect to a delivery of 320 cattle by Thomas McCulloch (rendered "MacUlauth") as payment to the estate of Sir John de Balliol according to the testament of Sir Alan Fitz Comte. (The latter appears to be Alan, son of Thomas of Galloway, the mormaer of Atholl). The second record of the name McCulloch (written as "MacUlagh") was an oath of fealty to Edward I of England in 1296 by Thomas, Michael and William McCulloch, on the Ragman Rolls. The seal of Thomas McCulloch was in the name of "S' Thome Maccvli" and bore an image of a squirrel. Two years later, Gilbert Makiluagh was deprived of his lands in Kirkcudbrightshire by Edward I after the defeat of the rebellion under William Wallace.

Andrew McCulloch's history of Galloway: A Land Apart suggests that their prominence in Wigtownshire identifies the family as one of the kindreds who amassed power and land under Roland (or Lochlann), Lord of Galloway, having supported him in the brief civil conflict against his uncle Gille Brichte in the later 12th century. However, very little is known about the McCullochs or their status within Galloway prior to the rise of the Lords of Galloway.

The McCulloch lineage held the lands of Torhouse, Myreton and Ardwell in Galloway until 1682. A study of this surname and its variants can be found at the Guild of One Name Studies.

=== McCulloch Support for Balliol Cause ===
In the History of the Land of Galloway and their Owners, P.H. McKerlie describes the McCullochs as "traitors" for not supporting King Robert the Bruce in his claims for the throne of the King of Scots and his eventual war for independence from England. Douglas McCullough counters McKerlie's charge in "A History of Clan McCulloch" and provides some context as to why the McCullochs supported Kings John Balliol and Edward Balliol and their ally, King Edward I of England.

In earlier medieval times, regions like Galloway and the Isles, were semi-independent lordships that generally supported the King of Scots. After the death of Alexander III, the McCullochs, like other Galloway families, supported the bid of John Balliol, son of Lady Dervorguila of Galloway, rather than De Brus. The McCullochs remained loyal to the Balliols even after King John was dethroned. In September, 1298, Gilbert Makiluagh was listed among the rebels in the south-west who had lands confiscated by Edward I after the collapse of the Wallace rebellion at the Battle of Falkirk. Sir Patrick McCulloch even entered exile in England with Edward Balliol.

When Edward Balliol pursued his claim to the Scottish throne, he did so with the support of several McCullochs, including Sir Patrick, and his sons (John and Patrick), William, Gilbert (and his son), among others. Sir Patrick also served Edward III in his campaigns in Brittany.

Because of their support for Balliol and King Edward I, King Robert the Bruce stripped McCulloch's of their extensive land holdings in Galloway. Around 1364, Sir Patrick returned to Scotland and entered the king's peace at which time King David II restored a portion of the prior McCulloch lands. An undated indenture purports to be a proposal for discussions between King Edward III of England and King David of Scotland with respect to the restoration of lands and castles seized by the late King Robert the Bruce. This indenture, which mentions Patrick McCulloch and other dispossessed landholders, may indicate that the restoration of the McCulloch lands was part of a broader settlement between the kings of England and Scotland.

=== McCulloch of Myreton (Galloway) ===
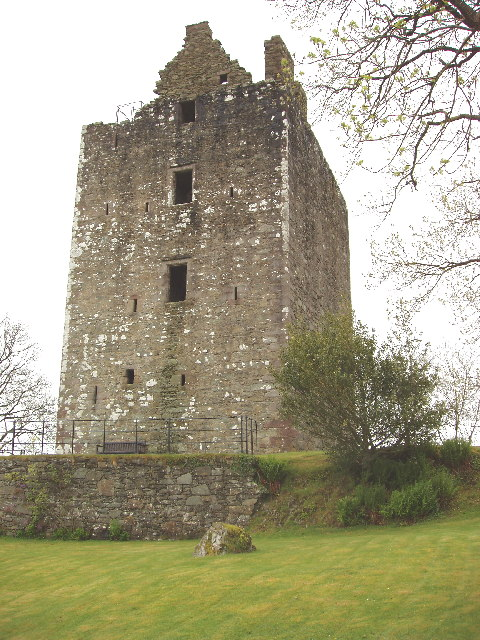
Cardoness Castle, seat of the McCullochs of Cardoness

The McCullochs of Myreton were a Scottish Lowland family who lived in Myreton, Ardwell, Rhins of Galloway, Wigtownshire overlooking Luce Bay near the Water of Luce. (see location on map on this page). Unlike other McCulloch families the McCullochs of Myreton were not septs of another clan but owned their own territory. They were later seated at Cardoness Castle. Myreton is in southwest Scotland along the coast in the Machars. Another McCulloch region related to Ardwell lies across the bay from Myreton.

Between the later 14th and mid-15th centuries, they were strong allies of the earls of Douglas, who had now acquired the Galloway lordship, witnessing their charters, supplying soldiers and ships of war for their forces, and maintaining places on their council. According to Michael Brown's history of The Black Douglases, McCullochs were part of the Douglas muster-roll that fought against the English armies at the Battle of Homildon Hill in 1402. Three years later, Sir Thomas McCulloch led maritime raids on English strongholds in Ulster, but was captured after sailing south to launch an attack upon Dublin Bay. John McCulloch was chancellor to the Countess of Douglas in the 1420s.

Though the power of the Black Douglases fell away in the later fifteenth century, the McCullochs outlasted their erstwhile patrons, and with castles built at Myretoun, Cardoness and Barholm on the Galloway shoreline, the strength of the family became a central part of Scotland's maritime defence. Their influence rose to its height in the career of Sir Alexander McCulloch (d. 1523), a favourite of King James IV of Scotland whom he served as chief falconer, sheriff of Wigtown and captain of the Royal Palace of Linlithgow. Under his authority, the McCulloch family and their following supplied the bodyguard for the newly-born Prince James in 1512, and were exempted from local legal and military duties in Wigtownshire while they resided at Linlithgow. In 1507, Sir Alexander ravaged the Isle of Man in revenge for an English raid on the town of Kirkcudbright. The Isle of Man was then in the possession of the Earl of Derby. Sir Alexander's daughter Margaret was married to a kinsman, another Alexander ('Sandy') McCulloch of Cardoness, who was a favoured member of the king's guard, and is recorded as archery partner to James IV, and as a regular participant in the royal jousts. At the Battle of Flodden, the younger MacCulloch was one of ten men clad in armour identical to the king, in an attempt to confuse the English adversaries. The ruse failed to work - James IV was killed, and so was Sandy McCulloch.

The power of the McCullochs on the national stage entered into decline after the reign of James IV. However, the family remained significant within Galloway, and a number of influential landholding branches had sprung off the main Myreton line. The McCulloch lairds of Ardwell and Killasser were among the leading Galloway supporters of Mary, Queen of Scots, summoned with the threat of a charge of treason to submit to the regency ruling after her deposition in 1569 and 1571. David, son of Thomas McCulloch of Nether Ardwall was in military service in the Thirty Years' War, and settled permanently on the continent; his sons Thomas and Anthony were officers in a British regiment in Spanish service during the War of Devolution (1667-8) against Louis XIV. A second David McCulloch of Nether Ardwall served in the armies of William of Orange before the 1688 Revolution, and then in the British forces in the Nine Years' War (1688–97). In 1715, he was offered but declined a commission in the Jacobite rebel army, commanded by his cousin William Gordon, 6th Viscount of Kenmure. In the earlier part of the seventeenth-century, the brothers John and James McCulloch, younger sons descendant from McCulloch of Killasser, attained distinction as scholars and physicians, both holding professorial chairs at the University of Pisa, and both serving as physicians-in-ordinary to King James VI/I. John McCulloch had worked previously as physician to the Holy Roman Emperor Rudolf II, who shared his enthusiasm for alchemy and astrology.

The chief of the Clan McCulloch of Myreton was raised to the rank of Baronet in 1634. However this title ended when Sir Godfrey McCulloch was executed in Edinburgh in 1697 for the murder of William Gordon seven years earlier. This may have been as a result of a fight over some cattle. Sir Godfrey's crime was the beginning of a time of severe misfortune for the Myreton line. [In Sir Walter Scott's version of the tale, Sir Godfrey is rescued from execution by a faerie whom Sir Godfey had previously befriended]. It is commonly stated that Sir Godfrey McCulloch of Myretoun was the last McCulloch Chief. However, in 1814, the Court of Lord Lyon granted a Coat of Arms to John McCulloch of Barholm as the direct lineal descendant and representative of McCulloch of Muile a younger branch of the ancient families of McCulloch of Myretoun and Cardoness, indicating Sir Godfrey McCulloch's line was extinguished, and granting McCulloch "Supporters" in his Coat of Arms. By granting "Supporters," the Court was recognizing John McCulloch of Barholm as Chief as a direct lineal descendant and representative of McCulloch of Mule. John McCulloch of Barholm died in 1851, the last of his line. Antiquarians struggled to understand the Court of Lord Lyon's grant of supporters to McCulloch of Barholm because the antiquarians confused James McCulloch of Muil with a cousin of the same name who lived a generation earlier and descended from a different line. In 1892, Andrew James Jameson assumed the name "McCulloch" and inherited the title "Lord Ardwall" from his mother's side of the family. Sir Andrew Jameson McCulloch was the thirteenth and final Lord Ardwall.

=== MacCulloch of Plaids (Ross-shire) ===
==== Origins in Plaids ====
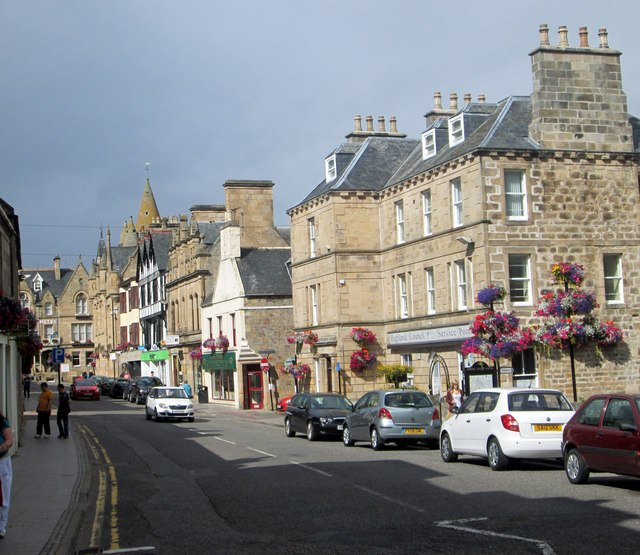
Tain High Street in modern times. The MacCullochs of Plaids held the bailliary and immunity of the town of Tain for several generations

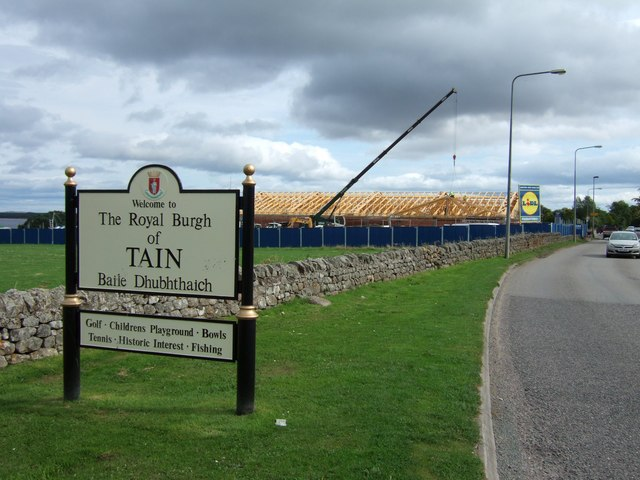
Tain was also a royal burgh from early times

Another MacCulloch family, the MacCullochs of Plaids, established themselves in Easter Ross in the Scottish Highlands by the 14th century. They were first noted as followers of the Earl of Ross and Clan Ross, and also as septs of the Clan Munro. The MacCullochs intermarried with Clan Ross so frequently they were included in Ross genealogies. The fact that the Court of Lord Lyon eventually matriculated the McCulloch coat of arms to Sir Hugh McCulloch of Pilton confirms that the family descends from McCulloch of Myretoun.

According to historian R.W Munro, if the Ross-shire MacCullochs had a Galloway origin then no details of it have been preserved, but it is possible that they came from some other part of Scotland. It is noteworthy, however, that an early record of a MacCulloch in Ross-shire was a 1431 inquest signed by Alexander MacCulloch who attached a seal bearing a shield, fretty, and apparent ermines similar to the coat of arms of the Galloway families. The first record appears to be a 1398 Earl of Ross charter witnessed by Alexaner McCulach. Plaids was formerly spelt Pladis, Pladdis, and the Pladdis. It is on the flat land on the coast to the east of Tain, about three quarters of a mile from the centre of the burgh. The estate gave its name to the territorial designation of the chiefly MacCulloch family of the North, who are recorded as land owners by documentary evidence from 1436 to 1552. In some early charters, Skardy is the designation used before Plaids came into use for the estate and although now obsolete as a place-name it has been equated with Hilton. What was known as Paul Mactire's Hill is near Plaids and was one of the 'court places' used by the Tain burgh.

Several of the Ross-shire MacCullochs became Canons Regular of the Premonstratensian Order at Fearn Abbey in Ross-shire.

==== Alexander MacCulloch of Plaids ====
Alexander MacCulloch of Plaids is on record from 1436 to 1443. He was an important person under Alexander of Islay, Earl of Ross and Lord of the Isles. He received a charter dated January 6, 1436/7 at Dingwall Castle for the lands of Scardy, Pladds, Petnely, Petogarty, Balmaduthy, and Ballechory, and it was witnessed by Hugh Ross of Balnagown Castle and George Munro, 10th Baron of Foulis. This charter gave him the office of bailie of the immunity of Tain. He also witnessed charters by the same Earl at Inverness in 1437, 1439, 1440. Alexander MacCulloch's last appearance is as a witness with George Munro of Foulis for another charter by the Earl at Dingwall on October 24, 1443. A daughter of MacCulloch of Plaids, whose Christian names have not been recorded, was the second wife of George Munro of Foulis and from whom the later Munro chiefs are descended.

==== John MacCulloch of Plaids ====
John MacCulloch of Plaids is on record from 1450 to 1466. He had a retour to his father, Alexander, for the lands of Skardy and Plaids on November 10, 1450. John of Islay, Earl of Ross and Lord of the Isles wrote to John MacCulloch who was the bailie of the girth of Sanct Duthowis in 1458, ordering him and the inhabitants of Tain to defend their neighbours in Inverness and not to allow their trade to be impeded, as ordered by the King. John MacCulloch witnessed a charter by Thomas Dingwall of Kildun on October 27, 1466, at Tain.

==== Angus MacCulloch of Plaids ====
Angus MacCulloch of Plaids is on record from 1483 to 1498. He first appears ordering the production of the charter for his neighbour, William McTeyr, for him to receive the lands of Achnaplad which was produced on February 27, 1483, at the head of the court near Scarde. Along with John Ross of Balnagowan and John Munro, 11th Baron of Foulis he was among the citizens of Tain who granted land in the town on behalf of the community in 1484. The Earl of Ross was forfeited in 1475 and in the disturbances that followed, the MacCullochs are said to have been with the Mackenzie force which defeated Alexander MacDonald of Lochalsh at the Battle of Blar Na Pairce. However, the MacCullochs are not mentioned when the Mackenzies drove Alexander MacDonald of Lochalsh out of Ross a few years later at the Battle of Drumchatt in 1497. It is related that the MacCullochs and Dingwalls, who were haid bound ther dependence on William Munro, 12th Baron of Foulis as the King's representative, lost all their men in an ambush by the Mackenzies in another Battle of Drumchatt in 1501. However, no MacCullochs of Plaids are specifically mentioned in this, nor on any of the previous occasions. Angus MacCulloch was accused on July 30, 1498, by the Lords of Council for taking part in spoiliation of 30 cattle and two horses from the lands of Tordarroch. Three days later he and John Vass of Lochslin were among those who had to pay damages to the burgess of Dysart, Fife.

==== William MacCulloch of Plaids ====
In 1505, William MacCulloch of Plaids had sasine for the lands of Pladys, Scardy, Petnely, Balmaduthy and Bellecarw. However, he was not retoured as heir to his father, John MacCulloch, until April 10, 1512. James IV of Scotland granted to him a charter for the lands of Scardy, Pladdis, Petnely, Pettogarty, Balmoduthy and Ballecarew, with the office of baillie of the immunity of Tain, on August 12, 1512. In 1513 and 1514, he was a member of an inquest at Inverness when Thomas Paterson who was the rector of Assynt was served heir to his uncle, William Paterson, and when Lady Elizabeth Gordon was served heir to her brother, John Sutherland, 9th Earl of Sutherland. William MacCulloch of Plaids brought an action against the Abbot of Fearn and others in 1534 as to whether the lands in Easter Catboll belonged to him in heritage, and he obtained a decree in his favour. He received a letter of regress from the King on part of Pitnele and Ballecouth on August 1, 1540. He died on October 15, 1541, at Folis (Foulis). He had married Agnes, daughter of Sir David Ross of Balnagowan and was succeeded by his son, Thomas.

==== Thomas MacCulloch of Plaids ====
On November 1, 1541, he was retoured as the son and heir of William MacCulloch of Plaids, in the lands of Pladdis, Skardy, Bellycarnich, and with office of bailliary of the immunity of Tain. He was on the inquest which found that Robert Munro, 14th Baron of Foulis was the lawful and nearest heir of Hector Munro, 13th Baron of Foulis that took place at Inverness on May 2, 1542. On May 20, 1547, along with the same Robert Munro he was one of an assize at Inverness. It was probably with his chief, Robert Munro, that Thomas MacCulloch joined the Scottish army that had mustered to meet the English invasion of Edward Seymour, 1st Duke of Somerset, as both were killed at the subsequent Battle of Pinkie near Musselburgh on September 10, 1547. Thomas MacCulloch had married a sister of Alexander Innes of Catboll and was succeeded by his son, Robert MacCulloch.

==== Robert MacCulloch of Plaids ====
Robert MacCulloch of Plaids is on record from 1547 to 1552 and was the last of his family to own that estate. On February 10, 1547/8 he received a retour as son and heir of his father Thomas in the lands of Pladdis, as well as the office of bailliary of the town and immunity of Tain. He was also excepted from paying feudal taxes because of the death of his father in the national cause. Mary, Queen of Scots, as the Countess of Ross, gave him sasine of his lands on March 22. He was a witness for Alexander Ross of Balnagowan at Edinburgh on April 21, 1550. He sold the lands of Plaids, Pettogarte, Bellequich, Ballekere, Petneille, Scarde and the bailliary of Tain to his uncle Alexander Innes of Catboll, captain of Orkney and his wife Elizabeth Innes, at Elgin on January 23, 155 1/2. On February 20, the Queen granted a charter to Alexander Innes and his wife for these lands and the name MacCulloch ceased to be associated with them.

=== MacCullochs of Kindeace and Glastullich (Ross-shire) ===
The MacCullochs of Kindeace and Glastullich held the lands of Kindeace in the parish of Nigg and Glastullich in Logie-Easter from the 17th century onward. They obtained Wester Kindeis in 1621 from Andrew Munro of Culnald. A manuscript genealogy shows that they were descended from the MacCullochs of Plaids. A later James MacCulloch of Kindeace married Christian Munro of Obsdale, sister of Sir Robert Munro, 3rd Baronet. A later Roderick MacCulloch of Glastullich was a captain in the Jacobite George Mackenzie, 3rd Earl of Cromartie's regiment during the Jacobite rising of 1745 and his estate was forfeited as a result. However, he was given a free pardon in 1748 and married in 1752 to Margaret Munro of Culrain. Roderick's sister, Mary, had a son, Hugh Rose who married Catherine Ross Munro of Culcairn and succeeded to the Cromarty estates including Glastullich. Andrew MacCulloch of Tain, a merchant and sea captain who traded between Scotland and Sweden, was also involved in the Jacobite rebellion, as the leader of a French-backed expedition that attempted the rescue of Prince Charles Edward in July 1746, after the Battle of Culloden. MacCulloch's vessel sailed between Mull and Skye, liaising with local Jacobites, but failed to locate the Prince, and returned to Gothenburg in April 1747.

=== MacCullochs of Cadboll (Ross-shire) ===
The MacCullochs of Cadboll in Ross-shire were closely associated with the MacCullochs of Plaids but no genealogical connection has been found between them. Catherine MacCulloch, wife of Farquhar Munro of Aldie, near Tain, and from whom she separated in 1605 due to his cruelty was the daughter of Walter or William MacCulloch of Cadboll.

=== MacCullochs of Pilton/Pitneilies/Mulderg (Ross-shire) ===
The MacCullochs of Pilton/Pitneilies/Mulderg are descended from the MacCullochs of Cadboll. Sir Hugh MacCulloch of Pilton was a knight who died August 6, 1688, in his 70th year and his tombstone at Greyfriars Kirk, Edinburgh states that he was descended from the MacCulloch of Cadboll family. He allegedly also claimed cousinage with the lairds of Myreton in Galloway and matriculated arms that advertised the affinity. An 1845 salt paper photographic print of Sir Hugh MacCulloch's monument at Greyfriars Churchyard entitled the Greyfriars Churchyard, Edinburgh, "The McCulloch Monument and the Martyr's Monument" is included in the University of Edinburgh Library prints collection. He left descendants.

=== MacCullochs of Tarrell (Ross-shire) ===
The MacCullochs of Tarrell held their estate in the parish of Tarbat and was once the property of the Tarrell family. John of Tarrell was chamberlain to William III, Earl of Ross in the 14th century and he witnessed the charter granted in 1370/1 from the Earl to Hugh Munro, 9th Baron of Foulis. Angus MacCulloch had sasine of Meikle Tarrell in 1505 and he may have been a cadet of the MacCullochs of Plaids. In this charter he was served heir to his grandmother Eufemia of Tarrell. However, an earlier Angus MacCulloch of Tarrell was recorded in 1484 as a citizen of Tain and was among the landed gentlemen killed in 1486 at the Battle of Auldicharish fighting for the Clan Ross against the Clan Mackay. Another Angus MacCulloch of Tarrell appears on record in 1534 and 1539 along with his son and heir, Alexander MacCulloch, in 1537. However, when Angus MacCulloch resigned his lands to the King in 154 1/2, they were granted to John MacCulloch who was probably his grandson. John MacCulloch of Tarrell who was a baillie of Tain, married in 1553 to Christina, sister of Thomas Moneypenny of Kinkell. He died in 1567 and left a widow, Elizabeth Ross. His son, another Angus MacCulloch, whose ward of lands and marriage were given by Queen Mary to David Chalmer on his forfeiture to Andrew Munro of Newmore in 1568. The deceased Alexander MacCulloch of Tarrell was described as the last possessor of Meikle Tarrell in 1576. John MacCulloch's only surviving heir, Marion MacCulloch, then entered into a contract of marriage with Andrew Munro of Newmore to marry his son, George Munro, in 1577 with the consent of her curators, including Robert Mor Munro, 15th Baron of Foulis. A Crown charter dated July 26, 1578, confirmed the lands of Meikle Tarrell to the couple. George Munro was head of the Munro of Milntown family and sat in the Scots Parliament. He died in 1623 and his son sold the lands to Roderick Mackenzie of Coigach who had them erected into a barony by James VI of Scotland.

=== MacCulloch of Oban (Argyll) ===
A distinct 'clan' of MacCullochs, the MacCullochs of Oban, lived in the vicinity of Oban, Argyll, and the island of Kerrara, on the West coast of Argyll. Here MacCulloch of Colgin was long recognised as the representative of his line. They were said to be descended from a race of MacLulichs who had lived in Benderloch under the Clan MacDougall. Although the Collins Scottish Clan Encyclopedia states that the MacCullochs of Oban were descendants of the MacDougalls themselves.

== McCullochs in Ulster and North America ==
At its nearest point, Northern Ireland is only twelve miles away from Galloway across the Irish Sea. It is likely that there was trade and migration between these locales for some time. However, the earliest recorded migration of Clan McCulloch to Northern Ireland might be when Sir William McCulloch of Myreton migrated to Ireland in the early seventeenth century. His son, Laird Alexander McCulloch of Myreton later followed him and settled in County Antrim around 1634, leaving his Myreton estate in the hands of his brother-in-law John McCulloch of Ardwell.

Descendants of these McCullochs who settled in County Antrim became prominent landowners and speculators in North Carolina. Eventually Confederate brigadier generals Benjamin McCulloch and his brother Henry Eustace McCulloch descended from this line.

Around 1609, James McCulloch, the elder, of Drummorrell was enlisted as an undertaker in the Ulster Plantation and granted 1,000 acres of land at Mullaveagh Manor in Donegal. He subsequently sold this property a few years later. It is unknown if any McCullochs settled in Donegal as a result of James McCulloch's temporary ownership of property there.

According to Andrew McCulloch, "Although the original McCullochs of Myretoun disposed of their family estates in the 1620s, they left numerous descendants, all of whom live in the United States". McCulloch indicates that, apart from the McCullochs of Barholm, the families named McCulloch who remained in Galloway after this time may not have descended from the McCullochs of Myreton.

Known descendants of the McCulloch of Myreton in the United States include John McCullough of Bohemia Manor (Maryland), a son of Sir Godfrey, and John McCulloch, Sir Godfrey's nephew who migrated to New Jersey by way of Ulster. The latter's descendants include Major John McColloch, the trailblazer of McCulloch's Trading Path, and the first High Sheriff of Ohio County, Virginia and his son, Major Samuel McCulloch, famous for McColloch's Leap. Other McCulloch immigrants from different lines also migrated to North America and beyond at this time and thereafter.

== Name Origin Hypotheses ==
=== Son of a Boar ===
In Scottish Gaelic the name may be rendered as MacCullaich which is translated as son of a boar. However, the name is rarely if ever spelled as "MacCullaich" based on a survey of available baptism, marriage, death, and other records available at Scotlands People and extant medieval or early modern records such as R.C. Reid's Wigtownshire Charters. This origin story is hard to square with the fact that the seal of Thomas McCulloch, Sheriff of Wigtown included an image of a squirrel and the earliest known family coats of arms featured wolves.

=== Hound of Ulster ===
An alternative derivation has been suggested that the name comes from the Irish Gaelic MacCú'Uladh derived from "mac" and the Gaelic forename Cú'Uladh which means son of the Hound of Ulster. This name is anglicized as McCullough or MacCullagh. The combination of "mac" and Cú'Uladh was used by Kings of Ulster as early as the 13th century. However, there is no documented link between the Irish name and the Scottish name that has become McCulloch. Current Y DNA data indicates that there are multiple haplogroups associated with surnames McCullough and MacCullagh, which may suggest independent origins.

=== Gwallawc ===
According to Sir Andrew Agnew, author of the Hereditary Sheriffs of Galloway, the McCullochs were an ancient Pictish people named for a 6th-century chieftain named Gwallawc, also spelled "Uallauc." Gwallawc, featured in Welsh ballads, may have been a king of Elmet and may have conquered part of the Kingdom of Rheged in Galloway. "

=== Cullo O'Neill ===
A tradition relayed by US Supreme Court Justice James Iredell (a descendant of the McCullochs of Killasser who migrated to County Antrim) linked the origins of the family to Cullo O'Neill, believed to have been born in Ireland, a son of the family of O'Neills of Clandeboye. Cullo O'Neill served in the army of Edward Bruce, King of Ireland, brother of king Robert the Bruce of Scotland. In around 1316 he was chosen by Edward Bruce as Captain of horse in his army. He later became Sir Cullo O'Neill. In about 1317 king Robert the Bruce of Scotland knighted Captain Cullo og Neil (o’Neil) and chose him to be his standard-bearer and Secretary of State. King Robert the Bruce granted Sir Cullo og Neil the lands of Achawan or Auchwane in Wigtownshire. In 1331 Sir Cullo Og Neil died and left his estate to his eldest son Sir Godfrey, who assumed the surname of MacCullog. (MacCullough / MacCullo’c). However, this origin story is dubious considering the McCulloch name was already in use prior to 1285.

=== Ulgric ===
Another origin myth speculates that the family descended from Ulgric, one of the leaders of the Gallovidian spearmen who fought and fell in the van of King David I's army at the Battle of the Standard in 1138.

== Y DNA ==
As mentioned above, Sir Andrew Agnew described the McCullochs as Pictish, presumably because the family was known to be an ancient family of Galloway. Alternatively, it has also been suggested that the McCullochs descend from the Gall-Goídil or Norse-Gaelic kindreds who took root in western Galloway in the 11th century, moving in from Ireland and the Hebrides, and gradually extending their imprint eastwards to become the dominant cultural influence on the province. However, current Y DNA data available at the FamilyTreeDNA "McCollough Project" indicate documented McCulloch of Myreton descendants are haplogroup R1a (R-BY32010). These unique Y DNA results cast doubt that the McCullochs of Myerton were paternal-line descendants Picts, Gaels, or Norse- Gaels and add to the mystery of the origins of Clan McCulloch. In a "History of Clan McCulloch," Douglas McCullough suggests the McCullochs of Galloway descend from Sarmatians who may have arrived at Hadrian's Wall around 175 AD.

== McCullochs in the Scottish Parliament ==
Several McCullochs served in the Scottish Parliament, including:

Alexander McCulloch of Drummorrell, Whithorn, 1669–74. (son of Robert McCulloch, of Drummorrell).

Andrew McCulloch of Tain, 1649.

Sir Godfrey McCulloch, Laird of Myrtoun, Wigtownshire, 1678.

James McCulloch of Tain, 1648.

James McCulloch of Findhorn, 1649.

James McCulloch of Whithorn, 1649 and 1650

John McCulloch, of Myrtoun, Wigtownshire, 1641.

John McCulloch, Provost Stirling, 1685–1686.

Thomas McCulloch, bailie of Tain, 1639–41.

William McCulloch, Laird of Myrtoun, Kirkcudbright, 1612 and 1617.

== Coats of Arms ==
There are several coats of arms registered with the Court of Lord Lyon by different McCulloch lines.

McCulloch of Myreton

McCulloch of Muil

McCulloch of Drummoral

McCulloch of Pilton

McCulloch of Barholm

=== Galloway ===
McCulloch of Myretoun. Ermine frette gules.

McCulloch of Cardoness: Ermine frette gules of eight pieces, and on an escutcheon azure, three wolves heads erased argent.

McCulloch of Ardwell: Ermine frette gules. Crest: A hand throwing a dart proper. (Granted to Sir Godfrey McCulloch of Myrtoun about 1672).

McCulloch of Drummorrell. Bears ermine frettee gules a bordur ingrailed of the second, Above the Shield ane helmet befitting his degree mantle gules doubled argent. The motto in ane Escroll Verus et Sedulus. (Granted to Alexander McCulloch of Drummorrell in 1672).

McCulloch of Barholm: Fret being engrailed, and the escutcheon azure, three wolves' heads erased argent; supporters, as heir-male of the families of Muile, Myretown, and Cardoness —two men in armour, each holding a spear in his hand proper. (Granted to John McCulloch of Barholm, 1814)

McCulloch of Mule and Inshanks: Ermine frette gules, a bordure, indented of the second.

McCulloch of Ardwall – Ermine fretty gules within Fretty a bordure of the last (1st and 4th quarters). (Granted to Andrew Jameson McCulloch of Ardwall, the younger, in 1899).

McCullock of Kirkclaugh – Ermine fretty gules within a bordure engrailed of the last (1st and 4th quarters). (Granted to William Edward Cliff McCulloch, the younger, of Kircklaugh in 1899).

=== Ross-shire ===
McCulloch of Pilton: Ermine a fret engrailed gules. (Granted to Sir Hilton McCulloch of Pilton, about 1672)

McCulloch of Cadboll – Ermine fretty

== Castles ==
- Cardoness Castle, which was built in the 1470s, was the seat of the McCullochs of Cardoness.
- Barholm Castle was the seat of a branch of the McCullochs of Myreton, who became known as the McCullochs of Barholm.
- Killasser Castle, another seat of the McCullochs of Myreton in Ardwell, known as McCullochs of Killasser, now in ruins.
- Myreton Castle was the seat of the McCullochs of Myreton which was built in the 16th century but was sold to the Clan Maxwell in 1685. The castle was built on the site of a 12th-century motte. Today it lies in ruins.

== MacCulloch Tartans ==
The MacCullochs of Ross-shire, as septs of the Clan Munro and Clan Ross, are permitted to wear either of those clans' tartans and the MacCullochs of Oban, as septs of the Clan MacDougall, may wear their tartan or even the District of Galloway tartan. However the MacCullochs themselves do not have a modern clan tartan as the last recognized clan Chief died before one could be created and authorized. The current tartan thought by some to be the MacCulloch clan tartan is actually a personal/name tartan for an individual.

== Spelling variations ==
"McCulloch" is the most frequently encountered modern spelling for the McCullochs originating in Galloway. "MacCulloch" appears to be more common with respect to the family from Ross-shire. Because few people could write centuries ago, and the written records that exist are sometimes in Latin, the spelling of the name varied greatly in medieval and early modern times. As a result, several modern spelling variations have developed. In addition, Y DNA data indicates there are multiple families with names similar to McCulloch, such as McCullough, McCullagh, but who are genetically unrelated. To add to the confusion, some families have adopted different spellings when migrating from Scotland, to Ireland, or North America.

Spelling variations for McCulloch and similar names include:

- Culloch
- Gulloch
- McCullough
- MacCoulaghe
- McCullagh
- MacChullach
- MacGillhauch
- M'Ilhauch
- M'Ylhauch
- Makkillauch
- MacAlach
- MacCulloch
- MacCullaich
- MacCullough
- McCulla
- MacCulla
- MacCullow
- McCollough
- McColloch
- McCoulough
- McCully
- McCulley
- McCullagh
- McCullah
- McCullow
- McCullar
- McCuller
- McCullers
- McCullick
- McCulligh
- McCulloch
- McCullogh
- McCullock
- McCulloh
- McCullouch
- McCoullough

== See also ==
- Horatio McCulloch
- John Ramsay McCulloch
- Benjamin McCulloch
- Henry Eustace McCulloch
- McColloch's Leap
- Hugh McCulloch
- John MacCulloch
- Cardoness Castle
- Unicorn Pursuivant
- Ormond Pursuivant
- Marchmont Herald
- Lord of Galloway
- Cruggleton Castle
- Gatehouse of Fleet
- Torhouse
- Candida Casa
- Dunskey Castle
- Stoneykirk
- Earl of Ross
- Clan Munro
- Clan Ross
- Edward Balliol
- McCulloch (disambiguation)
- McCullagh
