= Peter McCullough =

Peter McCullough may refer to:

- Peter A. McCullough (born 1962), American cardiologist
- Peter Eugene McCullough, American literary scholar
- Peter R. McCullough (born 1964), American astronomer

== See also ==
- Peter McCullagh (born 1952), Irish statistician
