= James McCullough =

James McCullough may refer to:

- James J. McCullough (born 1942), American politician in New Jersey
- James Parker McCollough (1950–2024), American lawyer and politician in Texas
- James S. McCullough (1843–1914), American politician in Illinois
- James T. McCullough (1816–1888), American politician from Maryland
- Jim McCullough Sr. (1928–2012), American film director and producer
