= Donald McCullough (minister) =

Donald W. McCullough (born 1949) is an American Christian minister and former President of San Francisco Theological Seminary.

McCullough was ordained in the Presbyterian Church (U.S.A.) and served as the senior pastor of Solana Beach Presbyterian Church from 1980 to 1994. He then served as President of San Francisco Theological Seminary from 1994 to 2000. He resigned from his position after admitting to inappropriate conduct involving two women. He was convicted of two counts of sexual abuse by the Permanent Judicial Commission of his denomination's San Francisco Presbytery.

McCullough wrote about his experience in his 2002 book, The Wisdom of Pelicans: A Search for Healing at the Water's Edge (ISBN 0142196231). He followed this with The Consolations of Imperfection: Learning to Appreciate Life's Limitations (2004) and If Grace Is So Amazing, Why Don't We Like It? (2005).

McCullough is currently pastor of Mendocino Presbyterian Church in California.
