= Celeste McCollough =

American psychologist (1926–2023)

Celeste McCollough Howard (September 12, 1926 – January 30, 2023) was an American psychologist who conducted research in human visual perception. She is best known for her discovery in 1965 of the first contingent aftereffect, known soon after as the McCollough effect.

== Career ==
Celeste McCollough published her first paper from her dissertation research at Columbia University (McCollough, 1955). After teaching 1954–1956 at Olivet College, Olivet, Michigan, she became the first woman appointed to a full-time position in the Department of Psychology at Oberlin College. In 1962–63 during her first sabbatical leave, she conducted research in Canada into the perceptual effects of wearing spectacles tinted with two colours (McCollough, 1965b). This led to her discovering the effect that bears her name (McCollough, 1965a). Her paper sparked hundreds of other scientific papers.

In 1970 McCollough resigned her position at Oberlin and devoted her time to raising a daughter and son. In 1986, she returned to vision research, under contract to University of Dayton Research Institute (UDRI). She worked on the role of colour in flight simulation displays for the Air Force Human Resources Lab at Williams Air Force Base, Arizona (e.g., Howard, 1992; Howard, 1994; Howard, 1996). Her work on the dim light available from early color displays led her to participate in the Commission International de l'Eclairage (CIE) division on mesopic photometry (e.g., Howard, 1997). She also completed research on the relation between the McCollough effect and global pattern-processing (McCollough, 2000).

After 1995, she joined the Air Force laboratory's Night Vision Training Research Program under contracts held by private corporations. This research included studies of early mesopic adaptation to luminance decrements encountered in the cockpit while wearing night vision goggles (Howard, Tregear, & Werner, 2000).

In November 2003, McCollough resigned from the Night Vision Training Research Program and moved to Portland, Oregon.
