= McAuliffe =

- McAuliffe (surname)

== Other uses ==
- McAuliffe (crater), a lunar crater named after astronaut Christa McAuliffe
- 3352 McAuliffe, an asteroid named after astronaut Christa McAuliffe
- Christa McAuliffe Fellowship Program
- Christa McAuliffe School, elementary and middle school in Saratoga, California
- Christa McAuliffe Space Education Center, Pleasant Grove, Utah
- McAuliffe-Shepard Discovery Center, planetarium in Concord, New Hampshire
