= Richard McCulloch =

Richard McCulloch (born 1949) is an American author who has written several books advocating white nationalism.

== Theories ==
McCulloch promoted the phrase "declaration of racial independence" in his 1994 book The Racial Compact. In this book he claimed that every race had a requirement for "its own exclusive racial territory or homeland, its own independent and sovereign government". McCulloch has given his views in the white supremacist magazine American Renaissance. In a 1995 article on "Separation for Preservation", he alleged that there was evidence "that a multiracial society is detrimental to the interests of European-Americans", going on to say that "Separation ... is necessary for [White] racial preservation". He is the author of "The Racial Compact", a website that advocates the maintenance of "racial purity".

In his 2005 book on the Melungeons, Walking Toward The Sunset: The Melungeons Of Appalachia, Wayne Winkler notes that McCullogh "espouses views that seem dated to many Americans today, but were widely held in the not-to-distant past ... since then, the idea of 'racial purity' has been largely - but not completely - discredited". As late as 2005, McCulloch's writings were being promulgated by Föreningen för Folkens Framtid (FFF, Association for the People's Future), a Swedish neo-Nazi networks.

== Bibliography ==
- Richard McCulloch (1982). The ideal and destiny. McClain Printing Company. ISBN 0-9608928-0-X.
