= Mike McCullough =

Mike McCullough may refer to:

- Mike McCullough (golfer) (born 1945), American golfer
- Mike McCullough (Canadian football) (born 1980), Canadian football linebacker
- Mike McCullough (politician) (fl. 1990s), former member of the Ohio House of Representatives
- Michael McCullough (psychologist) (born 1969), American professor of psychology
- Mike McCullough (baseball), Pacific International League president

== See also ==
- Mike McCulloch (1891–1973), Scottish footballer
- Michael McCulloch (c. 1797–1854), Canadian physician
