= William McCullough =

William McCullough may refer to:

- William McCullough (loyalist) (1949–1981), Northern Irish loyalist paramilitary with the Ulster Defence Association
- William McCullough (Northern Ireland politician) (1901-1967), Northern Irish communist and trade unionist
- William McCullough (New Zealand politician) (1843–1925), New Zealand politician
- Billy McCullough (1935–2026), Northern Irish footballer
