= Bob McCullogh =

English footballer

Personal information
- Full name: Robert McCullogh
- Date of birth: 20 June 1892
- Place of birth: Gateshead, England
- Date of death: 1972 (aged 79–80)
- Position: Inside forward

Youth career
- Radley

Senior career*
Years	Team	Apps	(Gls)
1911–1912	Sunderland	1	(0)
1913–19??	South Shields		
- * Club domestic league appearances and goals

Robert McCullogh (20 June 1892 – 1972) was an English professional footballer who played as an inside forward for Sunderland.
