= McCulloch's Path =

Early colonial route through Western Maryland, US

McCulloch's Path was an early colonial route through Western Maryland, referenced by George Washington in his diary in September 1784.

== Washington's account ==
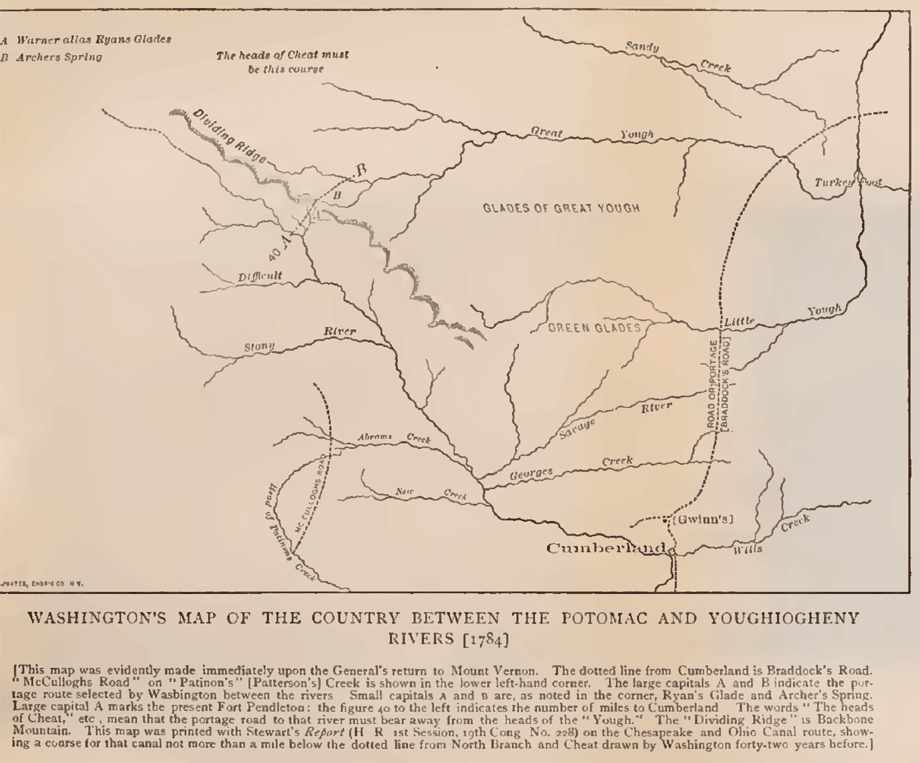
Washington's Map of the Country between the Potomac and Youghiogheny Rivers 1784

In September 1784, George Washington traveled into the Ohio basin in the interest of a commercial union between the Great Lakes and the Potomac River. In his diary he wrote,

At Bruceton, McCullough's Path turned southeast toward the "Great Glades of the Yoh,

Archer Butler Hulbert's study of the records at the law office at Annapolis in 1905 show that there were two McCullough's paths, an Old Path and a New Path; they are remembered, though the bold pioneer whose name they bore is quite forgotten. The names McCulloch and McCullough were common in northwestern Virginia.

== Historical map ==
The landscape of western Virginia and western Maryland in 1751 is depicted in A Map of the most inhabited part of Virginia containing the whole Province of Maryland with Part of Pennsylvania, New Jersey and North Carolina drawn by Joshua Fry and Peter Jefferson in 1751 and printed in 1755.

Map drawn by Joshua Fry & Peter Jefferson in 1751

== See also ==
- Potomac Company
- Ohio Company
