= McCollough effect =

Human visual perception phenomenon

The McCollough effect is a phenomenon of human visual perception in which colorless gratings appear colored contingent on the orientation of the gratings. It is an aftereffect requiring a period of induction to produce it. For example, if someone alternates between looking at a red horizontal grating and a green vertical grating for a few minutes, a black-and-white horizontal grating will appear greenish, and a black-and-white vertical grating will appear pinkish. The effect is remarkable because, although it diminishes rapidly with repeated testing, it has been reported to last up to 2.8 months when exposure to testing is limited.

The effect was discovered by American psychologist Celeste McCollough in 1965.

== Effect production ==
The effect is inducted by looking at a test image such as that below. It contains oppositely-oriented gratings of lines, horizontal and vertical. Next, the subject stares alternately at two induction images similar to the ones directly beneath the top image. One image should show one orientation of grating (here horizontal) with a colored background (red), and the other should show the other orientation of grating (here vertical) with a different, preferably oppositely colored background (green). Each image should be gazed at by the subject for several seconds at a time, and the two images should be gazed at for a total of several minutes for the effect to become visible. The subject should gaze approximately at the center of each image, allowing the eyes to move slightly. After several minutes, the subject should look back at the test image; the gratings should appear tinted by the opposite color to that of the induction gratings (i.e., horizontal should appear greenish and vertical pinkish).

Test/Induction Images
| One induction image for the McCollough effect. Stare at the center of this image for a few seconds, then at the center of the image to the right (with the green background) for a few seconds. Then return to this image. Keep looking between the two colored images for at least three minutes. | A second induction image for the McCollough effect. Stare at the center of this image for a few seconds, then at the center of the image to the left (with the red background) for a few seconds. Then return to this image. Keep looking between the two colored images for at least three minutes. | A test image for the McCollough effect. On first glance, the vertical and horizontal lines should appear black and white, colorless. After induction, the space between vertical lines should look red and the space between horizontal lines should look green. |

== Properties ==
McCollough originally reported that these aftereffects may last for an hour or more. Jones and Holding (1975) found that with repeated testing of the effect, the effect itself diminishes; subjects inducted for 15 minutes and then tested several times over the course of a few days lost the effect within 5 days, but those inducted for the same time but not exposed to testing until 85 days (2.8 months) later retained the effect.

The effect is different from colored afterimages, which appear superimposed on whatever is seen and which are quite brief. It depends on retinal orientation (tilting the head to the side by 45 degrees makes the colors in the above example disappear; tilting the head by 90 degrees makes the colors reappear, such that the gravitationally vertical grating now looks green). Multiple effects can be stacked by inducting with multiple sets of grids. A set of horizontal and vertical induction grids, and a separate set of opposing diagonal induction grids, will produce two distinct afterimages when a black-and-white grid is held normally and at 45 degrees. The number of different orientations that can be stacked is unknown. As well, inducing the effect with one eye results in no effect in the other eye. However, there is some evidence of binocular interactions.

Any aftereffect requires a period of induction (or adaptation) with an induction stimulus (or, in the case of the McCollough effect, induction stimuli). It then requires a test stimulus on which the aftereffect can be seen. In the McCollough effect, as described above, the induction stimuli are the red horizontal and the green vertical gratings. A typical test stimulus might show adjacent patches of black-and-white vertical and horizontal gratings (as above). The McCollough-effect colors are less saturated than the induction colors.

The induction stimuli can have any different colors. The effect is strongest, however, when the colors are complementary, such as red and green, or blue and orange. A related version of the McCollough effect also occurs with a single color and orientation. For example, induction with only a red horizontal grating makes a black-and-white horizontal test grating appear greenish, whereas a black-and-white vertical test grating appears colorless (although there is some argument about that). Stromeyer (1978) called these non-redundant effects. According to him, the classic effect with induction from two different orientations and colors simply makes the illusory colors more noticeable via contrast.

The effect is specific to the region of the retina that is exposed to the induction stimuli. This has been shown by inducing opposite effects in adjacent regions of the retina (i.e., in one region, verticals appear pink and horizontals appear greenish; in an adjacent region, verticals appear greenish and horizontals appear pink). Nevertheless, if a small region of the retina is exposed to the induction stimuli, and the test contours run through this region, the effect spreads along those test contours. Of course, if the induced area is in the fovea (central vision) and the eyes are allowed to move, then the effect will appear everywhere in the visual scene visited by the fovea.

The effect is also optimal when the thickness of the bars in the induction stimulus matches that of those in the test stimulus (i.e., the effect is tuned, albeit broadly, to spatial frequency). This property led to non-redundant effects being reported by people who had used computer monitors with uniformly colored phosphors to do word processing. These monitors were popular in the 1980s, and commonly showed text as green on black. People later noticed that text with the same spatial frequency, such as in a book, appeared pink. Also, a horizontal grating of the same spatial frequency as the horizontal lines of the induction text (such as the horizontal stripes on the letters "IBM" on the envelope for early floppy disks) looked pink.

A variety of similar aftereffects have been discovered not only between pattern and color contingencies, but between movement/color, spatial frequency/color and other relationships. All such effects may be referred to as McCollough Effects or MEs.

== Explanations ==
McCollough's paper has sparked hundreds of other scientific papers. Explanations appear to fall into three camps.

- McCollough indicated color adaptation of edge-sensitive neurons in lower, monocular regions of the visual cortex.
- A functional explanation of MEs has been posited in the form of an error-correcting device (ECD) whose purpose is to maintain an accurate internal representation of the external world. Consistent pairings of color and oriented lines are not found frequently in natural environments, thus consistent pairing may indicate pathology of the eye. An ECD might compensate for such pathology by adjusting the appropriate neurons to a neutral point in adaptation to orientation contingent color.
- A third explanation points to the contribution of classical conditioning to normal homeostatic regulation. MEs are explained by the same mechanisms as pharmacological withdrawal symptoms, thus the "pharmacological CR is expressed as pharmacological adaptation (tolerance) in the presence of the drug, and withdrawal symptoms in the absence of the drug" and the "chromatic CR is expressed as chromatic adaptation in the presence of colour, and the ME in the absence of colour". By this account MEs are of no adaptive value, but have been selected for as a domain-general ability to anticipate events. This is related to opponent-process theory.

These theories are not targeted toward the anti-McCollough effect.

Neurophysiological explanations of the effect have variously pointed to the adaptation of cells in the lateral geniculate nucleus designed to correct for chromatic aberration of the eye, to adaptation of cells in the visual cortex jointly responsive to color and orientation (this was McCollough's explanation) such as monocular areas of cortical hypercolumns, to processing within higher centers of the brain (including the frontal lobes), and to learning and memory. In 2006, the explanation of the effect was still the subject of debate, although there was a consensus in favor of McCollough's original explanation.

MEs do not transfer interocularly and from this it seems reasonable to deduce that the effect occurs in an area of the visual system prior to V1-4B, where binocular cells first occur.

== The anti-McCollough effect ==
In 2008, a similar effect with different results was discovered, and has been termed the "anti-McCollough effect". This effect may be induced by alternating pairings of gratings in parallel alignment, one achromatic (black and white) and the other black and a single color (say black and red). If the color used was red, then after the induction phase the achromatic grating appeared slightly red. This effect is distinct from the classical effect in three important regards: the perceived color of the aftereffect is the same as the inducer's color, the perceived color of the aftereffect is weaker than the classical effect, and the aftereffect shows complete interocular transfer. Like the classic effect, the anti-McCollough effect (AME) is long lasting.

Test/Induction Images
| One induction image for the anti-McCollough effect. Stare at the center of this image for 10 seconds, then at the center of the image to the right for 10 seconds. Then return to this image. Keep looking between the two colored images for 20 minutes. | One induction image for the anti-McCollough effect. Stare at the center of this image for 10 seconds, then at the center of the image to the left for 10 seconds. Then return to this image. Keep looking between the two colored images for 20 minutes. | A test image for the anti-McCollough effect. On first glance, the vertical and horizontal lines should appear black and white, colorless. After induction, the space between vertical lines should look green and the space between horizontal lines should look red. |

Given that AMEs do transfer interocularly, it is reasonable to suppose that they must occur in higher, binocular regions of the brain. Despite producing a less saturated illusory color, the induction of an AME may override a previously induced ME, providing additional weight to the argument that AMEs occur in the higher visual areas than MEs.

Explanations of the effect by adaptation of edge-detectors, functional ECDs, and classical conditioning are compelling but may have to be adjusted for the inclusion of AMEs, if the AME can be shown to replicate by independent labs.

== See also ==
- Optical illusion
- Visual perception
- Color vision
