= Charles Cameron Shute =

British army officer and Conservative politician

General Sir Charles Cameron Shute KCB DL
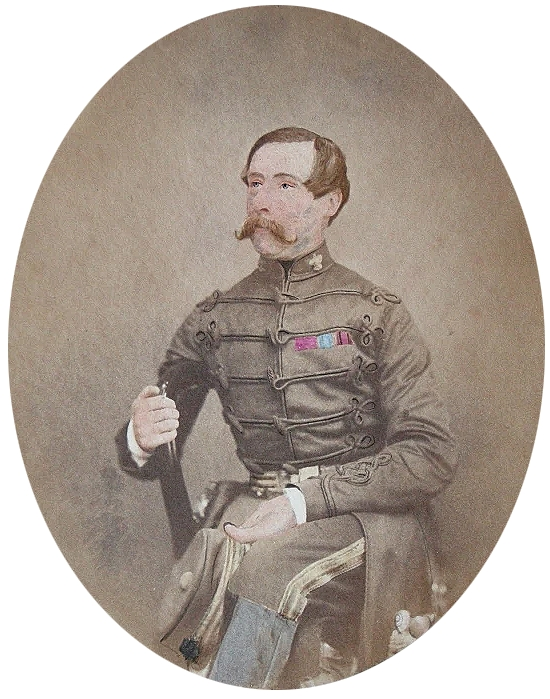
- Born: 3 January 1816; Burton House, Christchurch
- Died: 30 April 1904 (aged 88); Bournemouth
- Burial place: Extra-Mural Cemetery, Brighton
- Military career
- Allegiance: United Kingdom
- Branch: British Army
- Service years: 1834–1904
- Rank: General
- Conflicts: Crimean War: Battle of Balaclava

General Sir Charles Cameron Shute KCB DL (3 January 1816 – 30 April 1904) was a British army officer and Conservative Party politician.

== Early life ==
Charles Cameron Shute was the eldest son of Thomas Deane Shute of Fern Hill, Isle of Wight, and Bramshaw, Hampshire and his wife Charlotte née Cameron, daughter of General Neville Cameron of the East India Company army. He was educated at Winchester College. In 1858 he married Rhoda Dowler, daughter of the vicar of Aldeburgh, Suffolk. They had several children, including a younger son Cameron Dinsdale Deane Shute (1868–1938), an army reserve officer who married Amy Pepper-Staveley.

== Military career ==
In 1834 Shute entered the army with the rank of cornet in the 13th Light Dragoons, and served with distinction with the regiment during operations in 1839 in the Kurnool area of India. In the same year he was promoted to lieutenant. In 1840 he transferred to the 6th (Inniskilling) Dragoons. He served with the 6th Dragoons in the Crimean War, and Shute was promoted to major in June 1854, acting as second in command. He was assistant adjutant general of the cavalry division from November 1854 until its breakup in July 1856. He was mentioned in despatches for his service at Balaclava and was recommended for the award of the Victoria Cross. He was made a knight of the French Legion of Honour and the third Class of the Turkish Order of the Medjidie.

Shute also took part in the Battle of Inkerman and the Siege of Sevastopol. He was appointed brevet lieutenant colonel and commanding officer of the 6th Dragoons in April 1855, a post he held until 1860. In 1861 he retired on half pay with the rank of brevet colonel, but in May 1862 returned to the army as commanding officer of the 4th (Royal Irish) Dragoon Guards He remained the CO of the regiment until 1871 when he was promoted to major general. He was made a Companion of the Bath in 1869. From 1873 to 1879 he was honorary colonel of the 1st Sussex Rifle Volunteer Corps.

== Member of parliament ==
In 1874 Shute was elected as one of Brighton's two members of parliament. He, along with his fellow Conservative candidate, James Lloyd Ashbury, unseated the sitting Liberal members. He was only to serve a single term in the House of Commons as the Liberals regained the two Brighton seats at the next general election in 1880.

== Retirement ==
Although in parliament, Shute continued to hold military rank. In 1878 he was made a lieutenant general and appointed to the honorary position of colonel of the 16th (The Queen's) Lancers. He was placed on the retired list in July 1881, although he continued to hold the colonelcy of the 16th Lancers. In 1886, he became colonel of his old regiment, the 6th Dragoons, a post he held until his death. In 1889 he was made an honorary general and a Knight Commander of the Bath. In retirement he was active on the magistrate's bench, being a justice of the peace for Hampshire and Sussex, and a deputy lieutenant of the latter county.

He died at his home, "Dinsdale", Bournemouth in May 1904, aged 88 after a brief illness. He was buried at the Extra-Mural Cemetery, Brighton.

Parliament of the United Kingdom
Preceded by Henry Fawcett; James White	Member of Parliament for Brighton; 1874–1880; With: James Lloyd Ashbury	Succeeded by John Robert Hollond; William Thackeray Marriott
Military offices
Preceded by Sir Henry Dalrymple White	Colonel of the 6th (Inniskilling) Dragoons; 1886–1904	Succeeded by Edward Arthur Gore
