= Contingent aftereffect =

Optical illusion

In human perception, contingent aftereffects are illusory percepts that are apparent on a test stimulus after exposure to an induction stimulus for an extended period. Contingent aftereffects can be contrasted with simple aftereffects, the latter requiring no test stimulus for the illusion/mis-perception to be apparent. Contingent aftereffects have been studied in different perceptual domains. For instance, visual contingent aftereffects, auditory contingent aftereffects and haptic contingent aftereffects have all been discovered.

An example of a visual contingent aftereffect is the McCollough effect. The McCollough effect is one of a family of contingent aftereffects related to the processing of color and orientation. One can induce the aftereffect by exposure to a magenta and black vertical grating alternating with a green and black horizontal grating. After a few minutes of induction, followed by a break of a few minutes, black-and-white vertical and horizontal gratings will appear colored. The verticals will look green and horizontals pink in the example given. Therefore, the illusory color apparent on the test fields is contingent on the orientation of the lines in that test field. Furthermore, the orientation-color contingencies present in the illusion are the reverse of those present in the adapting stimulus (i.e., the magenta-vertical and green-horizontal adaptation gratings produced illusory magenta on the horizontal test gratings and illusory green on the vertical test grating). The illusion will reverse if one rotates one's head 90°. This is because the effect is retino-topic, that is, the effect is dependent on the orientation of the test lines on the retina.

There are also color-contingent motion aftereffects, and other varieties of these phenomena.

== See also ==
- Optical illusion
- Visual perception
