= USCGC McCulloch =

McCulloch or Hugh McCulloch has been the name of more than one ship of the United States Revenue-Marine, United States Revenue Cutter Service, or United States Coast Guard, and may refer to:

- USRC McCulloch (1865), also known as USRC Hugh McCulloch, a revenue cutter in commission in the Revenue-Marine from 1865 to 1875
- USRC Mosswood (1866), a revenue cutter in commission in the Revenue-Marine from 1866 to 1888 that was renamed USRC Hugh McCulloch in 1877
- USRC McCulloch (1897), a revenue cutter in commission in the Revenue Cutter Service from 1897 to 1915 and in the Coast Guard as USCGC McCulloch from 1915 to 1917
- USCGC McCulloch (WAVP-386), later WHEC-386, a cutter in commission in the Coast Guard from 1946 to 1972
