= McCullagh =

McCullagh is a surname. Notable people with the surname include:

- Colm McCullagh, Gaelic Football player for County Tyrone
- Crawford McCullagh (1868–1948), Unionist politician in Northern Ireland
- David McCullagh (born 1967), Irish journalist and author
- Declan McCullagh, American journalist and columnist for CBSNews.com
- Edward McCullagh (1912–1986), nationalist politician and farmer in Northern Ireland
- Francis McCullagh (1874–1956), war correspondent
- George McCullagh (1905–1952), Canadian newspaper owner 1936–1952
- James McCullagh (1809–1847), Irish mathematician
- James Benjamin McCullagh (1854–1921), Anglican missionary in British Columbia
- John H. McCullagh (1842–1893), American law enforcement officer in New York
- Peter McCullagh (born 1952), Irish statistician from Northern Ireland
- Sheila K. McCullagh MBE (1920–2014), British author of children's books

== See also ==
- McCullough
