= James Ness MacBean Ross =

Medical doctor (1889 - 1964)

- Born: 15 November 1889; London, England
- Died: 3 April 1964 (aged 74); Leatherhead, England
- Relatives: Dr Elizabeth Ness MacBean Ross (sister)
- Military career
- Allegiance: United Kingdom
- Branch: Royal Navy
- Service years: 1914–1919
- Rank: Temporary Surgeon
- Unit: Royal Navy Medical Service
- Conflicts: First World War: Gallipoli Campaign; Western Front; Battle of the Somme; Battle of the Ancre; Battle of Passchendaele
- Awards: Military Cross & Bar; Mentioned in Dispatches (3); Croix de Guerre with palms

Temporary Surgeon James Ness MacBean Ross, MC & Bar (15 November 1889 – 3 April 1964) was a British medical doctor who was deployed with the Royal Naval Division during the First World War. He was awarded his first Military Cross in 1917 and a Bar in 1918, he was also awarded the Croix de Guerre with palms and was mentioned in dispatches three times.

== Early life and education ==
James Ness MacBean Ross was born in London on 15 November 1889 to Elizabeth Ness, of Tain, Ross-shire, and her husband, Donald Alexander MacBean Ross, manager of the London branch of the Commercial Bank of Scotland. His father died at an early age and the family returned to Tain in Ross-shire. Ross was educated at Tain Royal Academy and Fettes College before entering the University of Edinburgh Medical School in 1907. He graduated with an MB ChB in 1911. After graduation he undertook hospital appointments in Edinburgh Royal Infirmary and other Scottish hospitals before moving to England to become house-physician to the Brompton Hospital and the Victoria Hospital for Children. He gained his MD in 1914.

== Military career and decorations ==
MacBean Ross joined the medical branch of the Royal Navy on 3 August 1914, the last day of peace before Britain entered the First World War. He served at sea in HMS Mars until he was transferred to 1st Battalion, Royal Marines Light Infantry, Royal Naval Division at Cape Helles on 15 September 1915. He was at Gallipoli at both the landing and evacuation and then at Salonika. On 9 October 1915 he was appointed as battalion medical officer to the 2nd Battalion, Royal Marines Light Infantry, Royal Naval Division in France. From 1916 to 1918 he served in France and Flanders and was involved in the Somme, Ancre and Passchendaele battles. He was first wounded, but remained on duty, on 13 November 1916 but he was invalided back to Britain on 19 March 1917 with trench fever. He was mentioned in dispatches on 9 April 1917 and rejoined the 2nd Battalion on 17 Apr 1917. His first Military Cross was awarded for actions at Gavrelle on 28 April 1917; the citation, published in the London Gazette on 17 July 1917, read:

Temp. Surg. James Ness McBean Ross, R.N.

For conspicuous gallantry and devotion on many occasions in organising and leading stretcher-bearers in search for wounded and attending them under very heavy fire.

A Bar was awarded to his Military Cross the following year; this was originally gazetted on 15 January 1918 but with the citation being published on 23 April 1918:

T./Surg. James Ness McBean Ross, M.C., M.D., R.N.

For conspicuous gallantry and devotion to duty in attending wounded in the front line under heavy fire, until himself severely wounded.

It is interesting that on each occasion that he was gazetted, his name is misspelt as McBean.

In addition to his MC and Bar, he was awarded the Croix de Guerre with palms and was mentioned in dispatches three times. In total he was gassed and wounded three times, the last time being on 26 October 1917 when he was shot through the left thigh, severing his femoral artery, while attending wounded marines in an exposed position near Passchendaele, resulting in the Bar to his MC. These wounds affected him for the rest of his life. He took the FRCSEd in 1918 and was finally discharged from hospital and invalided from service on 7 May 1919.

His war time experiences are recorded in a set of 1918 memoirs, On Four Fronts with the Royal Naval Division, that he co-authored with another doctor, Surgeon Geoffrey Sparrow MC.

== Post-war life ==
In 1920 MacBean Ross settled in Sutton, Surrey, and became senior GP partner in his surgery. He was a keen member of the Sutton and District Medical Society and was President from 1930–31. He joined the staff of the old Sutton Cottage Hospital before acting as secretary in its rebuilding as the Sutton and Cheam General Hospital. He was also surgeon to the Sutton Division of the Metropolitan Police and visiting medical officer at Epsom College. He was an honorary life member of the British Red Cross Society as well as being vice president of the Sutton and Cheam Division from 1936–53; he was awarded the Voluntary Medical Services Medal with three Bars. He retired from practice in 1953 and moved to Mickleham. In the last two years of life he endured deteriorating health and died on 3 April 1964. He is buried at Mickleham Church. He bequeathed £300 to the Sutton and District Medical Society. This was used by the committee to institute an annual 'MacBean Ross Lecture'.

== Personal life ==
MacBean Ross had two sisters, Elizabeth and Lucy, both of whom became doctors. At the beginning of World War I, Dr Elizabeth Ness MacBean Ross, at the invitation of the Serbian government, volunteered to serve in Serbia. She died of typhus fever on her 37th birthday, 14 February 1915. He also had a cousin in the Gordon Highlanders, James Sharp Ness, who was killed in 1917.

In 1921 he married Gwendolyn Agnes Cooper and had two sons, Donald, who died young, and David. The marriage was dissolved in 1945 and he later married Betty Adine Hoare, who survived him, dying in 1990.

== Honours and awards ==

Military Cross and Bar	1917-8
1914–15 Star	1918
British War Medal	1919
Victory Medal	1919
Defence Medal	1945
Voluntary Medical Service Medal and 3 Bars	
Croix de Guerre	1917
