= Tain & District Museum =

Local history museum in Tain, Scotland

Coordinates: 57.8121°N 4.0546°W

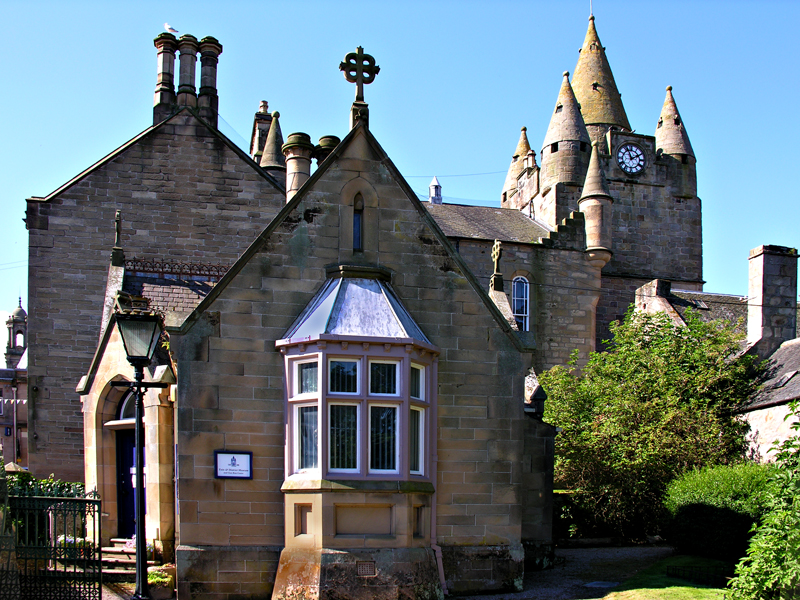
- Established: 1966
- Location: Tain, Ross-shire, Scotland
- Website: www.tainmuseum.org.uk

The Tain & District Museum is located in Tain, Ross-shire, Scotland. It is volunteer-run and is open April to October part of the Tain Through Time visitor centre. The museum was established in 1966 and has a collection of silver made in the local area.

== History ==
Rosemary Mackenzie had been asked to organise an exhibition of local material for the celebration of the 900th anniversary of Tain's royal charter in 1966. The museum was established and Mackenzie became the museum's first curator. Mackenzie was particularly interested in the town's history and had for years been collecting items of local interest, especially after the re-organisation of local government in 1975 when much valuable material might have been re-located away from Tain. The growing collection was held in what had been the caretaker's cottage of the Old Collegiate Church, built in the 1880s.

The museum is the custodian of a papal bull from Innocent VIII dated 17 July 1492.

The museum is staffed by local volunteers and is open 1 April to 31 October.

== Tain silver ==
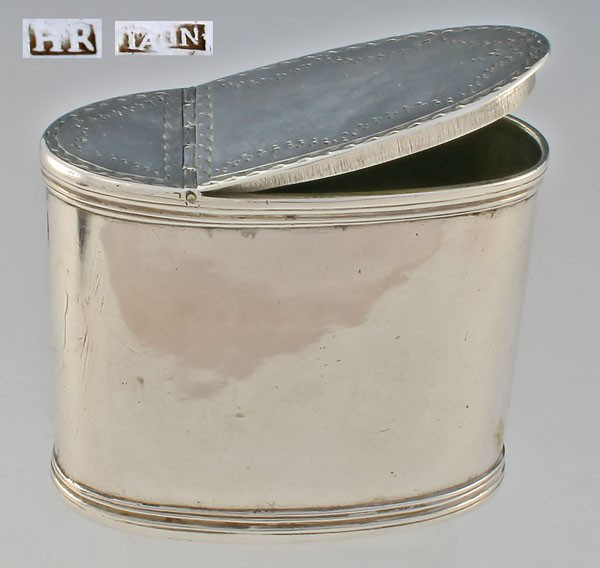
Snuff Box by Hugh Ross, Tain Silversmith, mid-18th century

From 2007 to 2013 the museum developed their collection of 18th and 19th century silver made in Tain. There was some support from the Art Fund. In 1997 Tain silver was the subject of the first exhibition mounted by the museum and included not only examples from the museum's own collection but also items from individual and corporate owners including one from the Royal Collection at Windsor. This example of Tain Silverwork was exhibited in the Empire Exhibition in Glasgow in 1938.

== Other exhibits ==
The museum changes many of its exhibits each season. 2011 displays included:

- local Tain involvement with Highland regiments in the 18th and 19th centuries
- Transport in the 19th and 20th centuries: railways, shipping, roads, bicycles
- Tobacco, snuff and whisky, 17th to 20th centuries
- Croft houses and domestic life in Highland homes
- Tain Royal Academy & Education, 19th & 20th centuries
- New technology in the home, mid-20th century

== Clan Ross Centre ==
The Tain & District Museum functions as the Clan Ross Centre and assists Rosses researching their clan roots. It tells the story of the clan down the centuries and links this to Clan Ross activities today. Information on the clan is available in a selection of books, DVDs together with other Ross mementos.

There was a large and active local East Ross population in Pictish times, (approximately 50BC to 900AD). They erected many carved stones which are now either standing in-place, displayed in Edinburgh, or preserved in Tain in the museum, such as the Ardjachie Stone.

A small part of the Nigg Stone is preserved in the museum.

== Tain Through Time ==
The museum forms one part of the larger visitor centre on the site, the whole of which is called Tain Through Time. This centre includes the Collegiate Church and an old schoolhouse, now called The Pilgrimage, with a gallery illustrating King James IV pilgrimages to Tain.

== Awards ==
In 1998 the museum was given an award as part of Hydro-Electric Scottish Museum of the Year Awards for the publication A Balance of Silver, a history of the old silversmiths of the Tain area.
