= List of listed buildings in Fearn, Highland =

This is a list of listed buildings in the parish of Fearn in Highland, Scotland.

== List ==
Name	Location	Date Listed	Grid Ref. (Note: Sometimes known as OSGB36, the grid reference (where provided) is based on the British national grid reference system used by the Ordnance Survey. • "Guide to National Grid". Ordnance Survey. • "Get-a-map". Ordnance Survey.)	Geo-coordinates	Notes	LB Number (Note: Historic Environment Scotland assign a unique alphanumeric identifier to each designated site in Scotland, for listed buildings this always begins with "LB", for example "LB12345".)	Image
Cadboll House And Walled Garden				57°46′28″N 3°53′11″W	Category B	7778	Upload Photo
Cadboll Dovecot				57°46′25″N 3°53′10″W	Category B	7779	Upload Photo
Fearn Former Manse (Hamilton House Mcfaid's House Farquhar House)				57°46′10″N 3°57′21″W	Category B	7781	Upload Photo
Fearn Abbey (Church Of Scotland Parish Church)				57°46′13″N 3°57′22″W	Category A	7780	Upload another image
Rhynie				57°47′14″N 3°56′13″W	Category B	7784	Upload Photo
Cadboll Castle				57°46′29″N 3°53′14″W	Category B	7797	Upload Photo
Fearn Railway Cottages				57°46′42″N 3°59′35″W	Category C(S)	7783	Upload Photo
Fearn Railway Station				57°46′41″N 3°59′37″W	Category B	7782	Upload Photo
Fearn Royal Naval Air Station (Former) Control Tower				57°45′37″N 3°56′16″W	Category C(S)	47342	Upload Photo

== Key ==
The scheme for classifying buildings in Scotland is:

- Category A: "buildings of national or international importance, either architectural or historic; or fine, little-altered examples of some particular period, style or building type."
- Category B: "buildings of regional or more than local importance; or major examples of some particular period, style or building type, which may have been altered."
- Category C: "buildings of local importance; lesser examples of any period, style, or building type, as originally constructed or moderately altered; and simple traditional buildings which group well with other listed buildings."

In March 2016 there were 47,288 listed buildings in Scotland. Of these, 8% were Category A, and 50% were Category B, with the remaining 42% being Category C.

== See also ==
- List of listed buildings in Highland
