= List of listed buildings in Tain, Highland =

This is a list of listed buildings in the parish of Tain in Highland, Scotland.

== List ==
Name	Location	Date Listed	Grid Ref. (Note: Sometimes known as OSGB36, the grid reference (where provided) is based on the British national grid reference system used by the Ordnance Survey. • "Guide to National Grid". Ordnance Survey. • "Get-a-map". Ordnance Survey.)	Geo-coordinates	Notes	LB Number (Note: Historic Environment Scotland assign a unique alphanumeric identifier to each designated site in Scotland, for listed buildings this always begins with "LB", for example "LB12345".)	Image
Manse Street, Manse House And Former Stables				57°48′44″N 4°03′28″W	Category B	41887	Upload Photo
13, 15 Manse Street				57°48′45″N 4°03′31″W	Category C(S)	41888	Upload Photo
Morangie Road And 1, 2., 3, And 4 Springfield				57°48′54″N 4°03′48″W	Category B	41893	Upload Photo
3, 5, 7 Shandwick Street				57°48′37″N 4°03′05″W	Category C(S)	41900	Upload Photo
5 St Duthus Street, Burnside				57°48′42″N 4°03′21″W	Category B	41906	Upload Photo
4, 6, 8 Stafford Street				57°48′34″N 4°03′08″W	Category C(S)	41907	Upload Photo
12 Academy Street				57°48′50″N 4°03′31″W	Category C(S)	41838	Upload Photo
Ankerville Street, Rosebank				57°48′37″N 4°03′01″W	Category C(S)	41840	Upload Photo
Chapel Street Shandwick Place Shandwick House,				57°48′47″N 4°03′20″W	Category B	41845	Upload Photo
Cramond Brae Castlehill (Formerly St Ronan's)				57°48′43″N 4°03′12″W	Category C(S)	41847	Upload Photo
1, 3 High Street				57°48′43″N 4°03′19″W	Category B	41859	Upload Photo
Inver, 10, Shore Street				57°49′14″N 3°55′00″W	Category C(S)	14974	Upload Photo
12 And 14 Knockbreck Street				57°48′34″N 4°03′05″W	Category C(S)	41877	Upload Photo
The Links St Duthus Chapel				57°48′47″N 4°02′45″W	Category B	41881	Upload Photo
6 Manse Street				57°48′42″N 4°03′25″W	Category C(S)	41883	Upload Photo
8, 10 Manse Street				57°48′42″N 4°03′26″W	Category B	41884	Upload Photo
12 And 14 Manse Street				57°48′42″N 4°03′26″W	Category C(S)	41885	Upload Photo
Shore Street, Thornhill, Thornton				57°48′49″N 4°03′24″W	Category B	41904	Upload Photo
17, 19 St Andrews Road, Craighill Estate, "New Manse"				57°48′40″N 4°03′36″W	Category B	41905	Upload Photo
10 Stafford Street				57°48′35″N 4°03′09″W	Category C(S)	41908	Upload Photo
Station Road Railway Station				57°48′51″N 4°03′07″W	Category B	41910	Upload Photo
1 Tower Street/Corner Rose Street, Procurator Fiscal's Office				57°48′47″N 4°03′26″W	Category B	41912	Upload Photo
Tower Street, Tower Gardens (Mr Munro)				57°48′44″N 4°03′22″W	Category B	41917	Upload Photo
Tower Street, Bank Of Scotland				57°48′46″N 4°03′20″W	Category B	41920	Upload Photo
16, 18 Tower Street, Gilleasbuig House				57°48′45″N 4°03′20″W	Category B	41921	Upload Photo
23 Academy Street				57°48′48″N 4°03′27″W	Category B	41837	Upload Photo
1 Ankerville Street				57°48′38″N 4°03′05″W	Category C(S)	41839	Upload Photo
3 Geannies Street				57°48′38″N 4°03′08″W	Category C(S)	41850	Upload Photo
Geannies Street 1 And 2 View Place				57°48′38″N 4°03′06″W	Category C(S)	41854	Upload Photo
11, 13 High Street				57°48′42″N 4°03′18″W	Category B	41861	Upload Photo
27 High Street				57°48′42″N 4°03′15″W	Category C(S)	41863	Upload Photo
Shore Road, Slaughter House				57°48′53″N 4°03′18″W	Category C(S)	44944	Upload Photo
King Street Free Presbyterian Church				57°48′39″N 4°03′16″W	Category B	41873	Upload Photo
King Street Balnagown Hotel				57°48′39″N 4°03′16″W	Category C(S)	41874	Upload Photo
2 Knockbreck Street				57°48′32″N 4°03′05″W	Category C(S)	41875	Upload Photo
5 Manse Street				57°48′42″N 4°03′25″W	Category C(S)	41882	Upload Photo
Manse Street St Andrew's Episcopal Church				57°48′47″N 4°03′36″W	Category B	41889	Upload Photo
1 Shandwick Street				57°48′37″N 4°03′05″W	Category C(S)	41899	Upload Photo
3 Tower Street				57°48′46″N 4°03′24″W	Category C(S)	41913	Upload Photo
Tower Street, Tower Gardens (Mr Cormack And Mr Munro)				57°48′44″N 4°03′22″W	Category C(S)	41916	Upload Photo
Tower Street Former Town Hall				57°48′44″N 4°03′21″W	Category B	41918	Upload Photo
Academy Street, Former Tain Academy				57°48′50″N 4°03′27″W	Category B	41836	Upload Photo
6 Cadboll Place				57°48′37″N 4°03′15″W	Category C(S)	41842	Upload Photo
Castle Brae St Duthus Collegiate Church With St Duthus Church, Graveyard And Retaining Wall				57°48′45″N 4°03′17″W	Category A	41843	Upload another image See more images
11 Geannies Street				57°48′37″N 4°03′10″W	Category B	41853	Upload Photo
High Street The Royal Hotel				57°48′43″N 4°03′20″W	Category B	41858	Upload Photo
33, 35, 37 High Street				57°48′41″N 4°03′14″W	Category B	41865	Upload Photo
39, 41, 43 High Street				57°48′41″N 4°03′13″W	Category B	41866	Upload Photo
High Street Tolbooth And Sheriff Court				57°48′43″N 4°03′18″W	Category A	41867	Upload another image
Hartfield House Walled Garden Enclosing Wall And Gate Piers				57°48′07″N 4°03′32″W	Category B	14970	Upload Photo
High Mills And Mill Cottage				57°47′26″N 4°03′39″W	Category B	14971	Upload Photo
Queen Street Tower Place				57°48′40″N 4°03′18″W	Category C(S)	41896	Upload Photo
Queen Street Kilrennie				57°48′40″N 4°03′18″W	Category C(S)	41897	Upload Photo
Scotsburn Road, Mansfield Hotel				57°48′27″N 4°03′40″W	Category B	41898	Upload Photo
Shore Road, Ross's Store				57°48′55″N 4°03′24″W	Category B	41903	Upload Photo
Tower Street, Tower Gardens. (Offices)				57°48′46″N 4°03′23″W	Category C(S)	41915	Upload Photo
Chapel Street, Croft-Roy				57°48′43″N 4°03′09″W	Category C(S)	41846	Upload Photo
1 Geannies Street				57°48′38″N 4°03′07″W	Category C(S)	41849	Upload Photo
7 Geannies Street				57°48′38″N 4°03′09″W	Category C(S)	41852	Upload Photo
5, 7, 9, High Street				57°48′43″N 4°03′18″W	Category B	41860	Upload Photo
Knockbreck House And Gate Piers				57°48′15″N 4°02′36″W	Category B	14972	Upload Photo
Hunting Hill, Tain, Operations Block				57°48′10″N 4°00′01″W	Category B	44945	Upload Photo
King Street Alpin House				57°48′38″N 4°03′16″W	Category C(S)	41872	Upload Photo
Moss Road, Rosslyn				57°48′48″N 4°03′37″W	Category B	41894	Upload Photo
13 Shandwick Street Kingsway Cottage				57°48′35″N 4°03′08″W	Category B	41901	Upload Photo
Shandwick Street St Duthus Centre. (Formerly St Duthus Parish Church)				57°48′36″N 4°03′05″W	Category B	41902	Upload Photo
14 And 16 Stafford Street				57°48′35″N 4°03′10″W	Category C(S)	41909	Upload Photo
The Links, Alexander Footbridge				57°48′54″N 4°02′46″W	Category B	41922	Upload Photo
4 Dunrobin Street Dunrobin House				57°48′51″N 4°03′32″W	Category B	41848	Upload Photo
23, 25 High Street (Including Hill View, Market Street				57°48′42″N 4°03′16″W	Category B	41862	Upload Photo
18 High Street				57°48′42″N 4°03′15″W	Category B	41869	Upload Photo
Knockbreck Toll				57°48′00″N 4°02′27″W	Category C(S)	18549	Upload Photo
Aldie Mill				57°47′49″N 4°02′29″W	Category B	14969	Upload Photo
Manse Street, Murrayfield Including Boundary Wall, Railings And Gate				57°48′47″N 4°03′33″W	Category C(S)	49633	Upload Photo
4, 6, 8 Lamington Street				57°48′40″N 4°03′09″W	Category C(S)	41880	Upload Photo
Queen Street, Tain Parish Church (Church Of Scotland)				57°48′39″N 4°03′20″W	Category B	41895	Upload Photo
2 Gower Place, Sutherland Street				57°48′30″N 4°03′08″W	Category C(S)	41911	Upload Photo
5 Tower Street				57°48′46″N 4°03′24″W	Category B	41914	Upload Photo
24-28 (Even) Tower Street				57°48′44″N 4°03′19″W	Category B	41919	Upload Photo
Castle Brae Museum				57°48′44″N 4°03′17″W	Category B	41844	Upload Photo
2 Gower Street				57°48′31″N 4°03′07″W	Category C(S)	41855	Upload Photo
3 Gower Street				57°48′31″N 4°03′08″W	Category B	41856	Upload Photo
Knockbreck Walled Garden				57°48′16″N 4°02′29″W	Category C(S)	14973	Upload Photo
High Street Kenneth Murray Monument				57°48′41″N 4°03′12″W	Category B	41871	Upload Photo
10 Knockbreck Street				57°48′35″N 4°03′05″W	Category B	41876	Upload Photo
16 Manse Street				57°48′43″N 4°03′27″W	Category C(S)	41886	Upload Photo
Market Street The Market				57°48′40″N 4°03′16″W	Category B	41891	Upload Photo
Morangie Road Mayfield				57°48′54″N 4°03′42″W	Category B	41892	Upload Photo
5 Geannies Street				57°48′38″N 4°03′08″W	Category B	41851	Upload Photo
5 Gower Street				57°48′31″N 4°03′09″W	Category C(S)	41857	Upload Photo
High Street District Council Offices				57°48′42″N 4°03′13″W	Category B	41870	Upload Photo
18 Knockbreck Street, Kingarth				57°48′34″N 4°03′06″W	Category C(S)	41878	Upload Photo
3, 5 Lamington Street (Co-Operative)				57°48′41″N 4°03′12″W	Category C(S)	41879	Upload Photo
Market Street Clydesdale Bank				57°48′41″N 4°03′17″W	Category B	41890	Upload Photo
Ankerville Street Knockbreck Primary School				57°48′34″N 4°02′57″W	Category B	41841	Upload Photo
31 High Street				57°48′42″N 4°03′15″W	Category C(S)	41864	Upload Photo
High Street Market Cross				57°48′43″N 4°03′18″W	Category B	41868	Upload Photo

== Key ==
The scheme for classifying buildings in Scotland is:

- Category A: "buildings of national or international importance, either architectural or historic; or fine, little-altered examples of some particular period, style or building type."
- Category B: "buildings of regional or more than local importance; or major examples of some particular period, style or building type, which may have been altered."
- Category C: "buildings of local importance; lesser examples of any period, style, or building type, as originally constructed or moderately altered; and simple traditional buildings which group well with other listed buildings."

In March 2016 there were 47,288 listed buildings in Scotland. Of these, 8% were Category A, and 50% were Category B, with the remaining 42% being Category C.

== See also ==
- List of listed buildings in Highland
