= Saint Duthac =

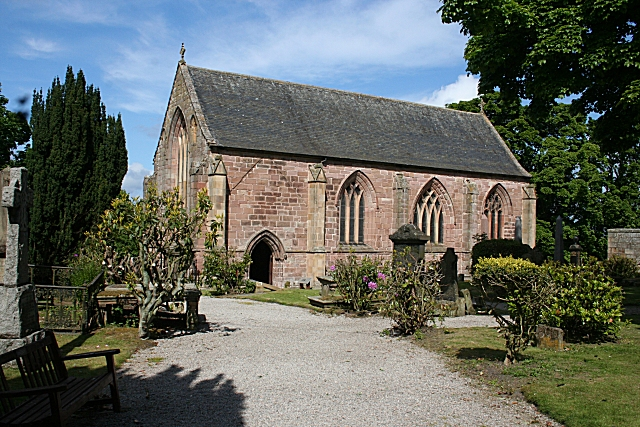
St Duthus Kirk

Saint Duthac (also Duthus or Duthak; 1000–1065) was a Scottish Christian prelate who served as Bishop of Ross. He is the patron saint of Tain in Scotland. His feast day is 8 March.

== Biography and legacy ==
According to the Aberdeen Breviary, Duthac was a native Scot. Tradition has it that Duthac was born in Tain and educated in Ireland.

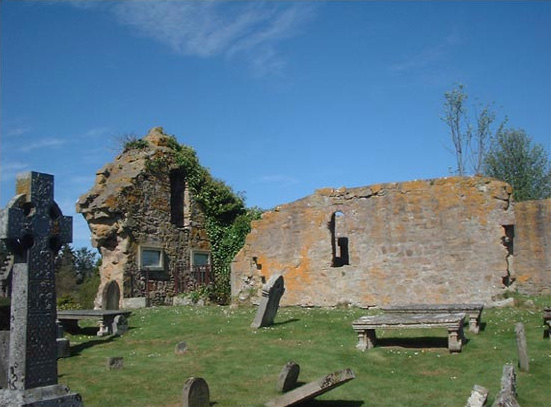
St Duthus Chapel

A chapel was built in his honour and a sanctuary established at Tain by the great Ferchar mac in tSagairt, first Earl or Mormaer of Ross in the thirteenth century, and was ministered by the Norbertine canons of Fearn Abbey. St. Duthus's Chapel, is thought to have been where St Duthac was born. A century later, this sanctuary was notably breached by English supporters who captured Robert the Bruce's wife, daughter and sisters sheltering in the chapel. The chapel was burnt later in political violence between regional power groups, namely the Clan MacKay and the Clan Ross. The ruins of the chapel still exist as a centrepiece of St Duthus Old Burial Ground on the shores of the Dornoch Firth.

Saint Duthac was greatly venerated in Scotland and his memory is still preserved in variations, in the names of places and organisations, including Kilduthie; Arduthie near Stonehaven and Kilduich on the Loch Duich. Tain, where he is reputed to have died and been buried, had the Church built in his honour. His death is recorded in the "Annals of Ulster" for the year 1065. After many years his body was found to be incorrupt and his relics were translated to the shrine at St. Duthus Collegiate Church built between 1370 and 1458. The ruins of the St Duthus Church are still there but the relics disappeared c. 1560 at the time of the Reformation.

== Veneration ==
St Duthac was known as the Chief Confessor of Ireland and Scotland (Dubtach Albanach) and his saint's feast day is 8 March. His shrine was visited multiple times by King James IV, Robert the Bruce and his family, and other notable pilgrims.

Tain is called Baile Dhubhthaich in Scottish Gaelic or Duthac's Town and near it stands St. Duthac's Cairn, although the biennial Fairs called by his name are no longer held in the town.

St Duthac is venerated by Catholics, Anglicans, and Eastern Orthodox Christians.

== St Duthac's Way ==
St Duthac's Way runs from Tain to Aberdeen, with an expanded section continuing to St. Andrews. From St Mary's Cathedral in Aberdeen the route continues to Stonehaven and goes down the coast pass Dunnottar Castle to Montrose, then pass Arbroath Abbey and Inchcape to Dundee, and on to St Andrews.

== Bibliography ==
- Boyle, Alexander, "Notes on Scottish Saints," in The Innes Review, Spring 1981, pp. 66–7

See the Acta Sanctorum and KSS pp. 328–329
