= David Robertson (minister) =

Scottish minister (born 1962)

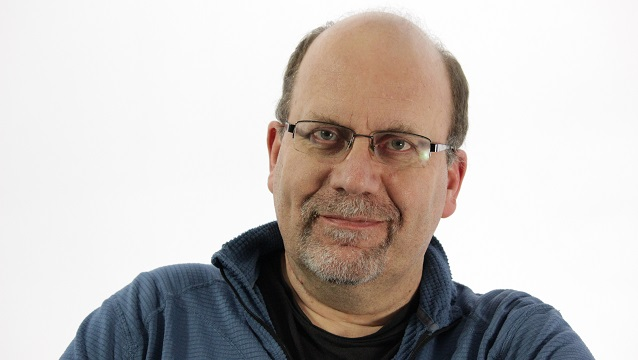
- Born: David Andrew Robertson; 2 May 1962 (age 63); Berwick-upon-Tweed, England
- Education: B.A. University of Edinburgh, 1983; M.A. Free Church College (ETS), 1983
- Occupation: Minister
- Spouse: Annabel
- Children: 3
- Religion: Reformed - New Calvinism
- Church: St Peter's Free Church of Scotland, Dundee
- Ordained: Free Church of Scotland
- Writings: Awakening : the life and ministry of Robert Murray McCheyne (2010); The Dawkins letters : challenging atheist myths (2007); Magnificent Obsession : Why Jesus Is Great (2013).; Quench : Cafe Culture Evangelism (2014); Engaging with Atheists : Understanding their world; sharing good news (2014); A.S.K. : Real World Questions / Real World Answers (2019).
- Congregations served: Brora Free Church, Sutherland; St.Peter's Free Church, Dundee;
- Offices held: Moderator of the Free Church of Scotland (2015-16)
- Website: theweeflea.com

David Andrew Robertson (born 2 May 1962) is a Scottish Presbyterian minister and religious commentator. Robertson was the minister of St Peter's Free Church in Dundee, Scotland, from 1992 until 2019. He served as Moderator of the Free Church of Scotland between 2015 and 2016. Robertson is also a blogger, podcaster, and writer. He gained public attention following his critique of The God Delusion by Richard Dawkins and has since become a commentator on religious, social, and political affairs in Scotland, with an annual readership of over one million.

== Early life and education ==
Robertson was born in Berwick-upon-Tweed, and was brought up in Fearn in Easter Ross. He spent his secondary school years at Tain Royal Academy.

Robertson graduated from both the University of Edinburgh with a M.A Honours degree in history, and from Free Church College (now Edinburgh Theological Seminary) with a diploma in theology, in 1983.

== Career ==
Robertson had originally planned a career in politics, intending to stand for the Social Democratic Party (SDP) in his home seat of Ross, Cromarty and Skye in the 1983 general election. However, a failed bid to become Senior President of Edinburgh University Students Association precipitated a change in direction, and in August 1986 he became the youngest minister in the Free Church of Scotland, while his contemporary Charles Kennedy went on to win the same seat he had hoped to contest, becoming the youngest Member of Parliament in the process.

Robertson's first full-time ministry charge was in Clyne Free Church, in Brora, from 1986. He became the minister of St Peter's Free Church, Dundee, (the historic church of Robert Murray McCheyne), in October 1992, where he worked closely with Scottish theologian Sinclair Ferguson. He was the Moderator of the Free Church of Scotland between 2015 and 2016, replacing Rev David Miller.

Robertson co-founded Solas (Centre for Public Christianity) in June 2010 with the former SNP leader, Gordon Wilson, who was a member of St Peter's Free Church in his final years. Robertson remained the director of Solas until 2018. Before moving to Australia in 2019, he was also a chaplain at the University of Dundee and former club chaplain of Dundee F.C.

Robertson moved to Sydney, Australia to work with City Bible Forum in 2019. After that, he worked with Sydney Anglicans in their Evangelism and New Churches organisation. Since November 2023, he has been the Minister of the Scots Kirk in Newcastle, New South Wales, Australia.

== Writings and broadcasting ==
Robertson's writings have been featured in The Scotsman and Christian Today, and he has appeared several times on Moody Radio. He sits on the editorial advisory board for Scottish Christian Broadcast.

From 2014 Robertson hosted a weekly podcast on current affairs called Quantum of Solas, which began during his role with Solas Centre for Public Christianity. A new series of Quantum began in 2018 separately from Solas, his podcast being retitled Beauty for Ashes in 2025. He featured in another podcast series, Unbelievable?, debating several prominent atheists. He was also the editor of The Record, the Free Church's main magazine for several years.

Robertson has a blog, The Wee Flea, the name of which alludes both to Richard Dawkins' description of Robertson, John Lennox, and Alister McGrath as "fleas living off a dog's back", and to the Scottish colloquialism "Wee Frees" - referring to the Free Church of Scotland. In 2017, Robertson's blog was viewed 900,000 times from 190 countries and by April 2021 it had a total of over 6 million hits.

== Awards ==
In 2014, 2015, and 2016, Robertson was voted one of the 100 most influential Christians in the UK by online voters on "Archbishop Cranmer's Top 100 List".

Robertson's blog won Runner Up in "Blogger of the Year" category in 2014, and featured as a Finalist in the "Most Inspiring Leadership Blog" category in 2015, both of the Premier Digital Christian New Media Awards.

== Personal life ==
Shortly before entering the ministry, he married Annabel MacLeod, a nurse from Parkend near Stornoway, who is now a social worker. He has three children. His son, Andrew, is the minister of Charleston Community Church in Dundee, a Free Church that was planted from St Peter's Free Church during David's ministry.

== Selected publications ==
- A.S.K. : Real World Questions / Real World Answers (2019) ISBN 978-1-5271-0339-9, for teenagers.
- Quench : Cafe Culture Evangelism (2014) ISBN 978-0993083204
- Engaging with Atheists : Understanding their world; sharing good news (2014) ISBN 9781909919099
- Magnificent Obsession : Why Jesus Is Great (2013) ISBN 9781781912713.
- Awakening : the life and ministry of Robert Murray McCheyne (2010) ISBN 978-1845505424, a contemporary account of Robert Murray McCheyne's life
- The Dawkins letters : challenging atheist myths (2007) ISBN 978-1845505974, a response to Richard Dawkins' The God Delusion

== Debates ==
Through his roles in Solas Centre for Public Christianity, and the 'Unbelievable?' podcast, Robertson has debated several public figures on a range of social and theological issues:

- BBC Scotland - Debate Night; The panel included: depute leader of the SNP at Westminster, Kirsty Blackman; the Conservative MP for Stirling, Stephen Kerr; the Scottish Labour MSP for Mid Scotland and Fife, Alex Rowley; President of the Royal Society of Edinburgh, Dame Anne Glover. Topics debated: Brexit, Trump, and the NHS. 2 June 2019
- Peter Tatchell (Peter Tatchell Foundation) The Future of Marriage Debate; 11 December 2013
- Scott S McKenna (Church of Scotland) on atonement; A public conversation; chaired by Rt Rev Dr Angus Morrison (Moderator of the Church of Scotland)
- Matt Dillahunty (American public speaker, internet personality, atheist); Why I Am Not An Atheist; and 'Why I Am Not A Christian'
- Patrick Harvie MSP (Scottish Green Party) & William Rennie MSP (Scottish Liberal Democrats) versus David Robertson & Peter D Williams; Same Sex Marriage?
- Michael Shermer (Skeptics Society); Is Christianity Good For Us
- Gary McLelland (Scottish Liberal Democrats, Humanist Society Scotland); Is Belief in God a Delusion?; Is Belief in God Reasonable
- Michael Nugent (Atheist Ireland); Is Christianity Holding Us Back?
- Peter Cave (British Humanist Association); Better With or Without God
- Alistair Mcbay (National Secular Society); Is Faith in God a Delusion?
- Andrew Copson FRSA, MCMI, MCIPR (Chief Executive, British Humanist Association; President, International Humanist and Ethical Union); Are We Better Off Without God
- Adrian Hyyrylainen-Trett (Liberal Democrats); The Gay Marriage Debate
- Peter D Williams (Executive Officer, Right To Life); Catholic vs Protestant - Is the Catholic Church the One True Church?
- Robertson regularly debated at Abertay University held by its Division of Sociology.

Free Church titles
Preceded by Rev David Miller	Moderator of the Free Church of Scotland; 2015-16	Succeeded by Rev Dr John Nicholls
