= Elizabeth Ness MacBean Ross =

Scottish physician (1878 - 1915)

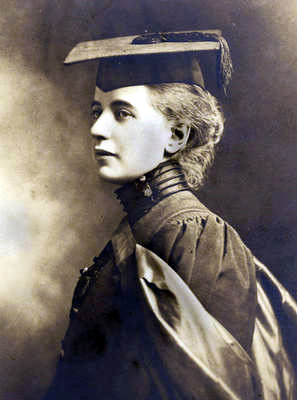
- Graduation portrait
- Born: Elizabeth Ness MacBean Ross; 14 February 1878; London, England
- Died: 14 February 1915 (aged 37); Kragujevac, Serbia
- Cause of death: Typhus
- Education: Tain Royal Academy; University of Glasgow
- Occupation: Physician
- Known for: Medical work in Persia; Treatment of typhus in Serbia

Elizabeth Ness MacBean Ross (14 February 1878 – 14 February 1915) was a Scottish physician who worked in Persia (presently Iran) among the Bakhtiari people. With training and a post-graduate qualification in tropical medicine, she responded to an appeal for doctors by the Serbian government in 1915 and treated Serbian casualties, most of whom were victims of typhus. Ross's life and work is commemorated by a plaque in her home town of Tain and her death anniversary is commemorated by ceremonies in Serbia, on 14 February.

== Early life and family ==
Elizabeth Ness MacBean Ross was born in Hampstead, London, to Scottish parents. Her father, Donald Alexander MacBean Ross (1849–1893), manager of the London branch of the Commercial Bank of Scotland, was originally from Inverness, while her mother, Elizabeth Wilson Ross (née Ness) was from Tain.

When her father died, they moved to her mother's family in Tain, where she attended Tain Royal Academy. She went on to study medicine at Queen Margaret College, Glasgow, in 1896. This was some two years after Marion Gilchrist, the first woman to qualify in medicine from a university in Scotland, had graduated. Ross graduated with an MB ChB in 1901./ After graduating was made a Fellow of the Royal Society of Tropical Medicine.

Lucy, one of Ross's sisters, also graduated in medicine and became a doctor in York. James Ness MacBean Ross, her brother, became a naval doctor and was awarded the Military Cross and bar and the Croix de Guerre during the First World War.

== Early career ==
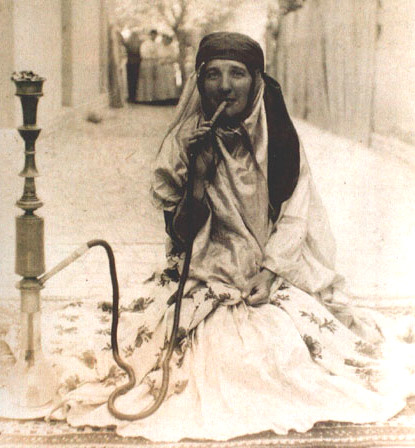
Elizabeth Ross in Bakhtiari costume c. 1909

After graduation Ross worked in Tain and then as a medical officer on the Scottish island of Colonsay. She then spent eighteen months in practice in East Ham in London. She accepted a post in Isfahan province as assistant to an Armenian physician in the city of Isfahan before setting up in practice on her own. Returning on leave to the UK she passed the examination to gain the Diploma in Tropical Medicine. On her return to Persia, she met Samsam al-Saltane (1846–1930), prime minister of Persia and at his suggestion began to work with Bakhtiari people of south west Persia.

Adopting their customs and their dress, she became integrated to such an extent that she was made an honorary chief of the Bakhtiari. She wrote a memoir describing her experience among them, A Lady Doctor in Bakhtiari Land, which was published posthumously with her brother James as editor. In this, she provided "first-hand information as to the life, the point of view, and the changing conditions among these virile, if unstable, tribesmen."

In 1913, she successfully applied for a job as a ship's surgeon on the SS Nigaristan to work her way home. She subsequently became ship's surgeon on the Glasgow Line SS Glenlogan, a post which took her to India and Japan before she returned to Isfahan in 1914.

== Serbia ==
On the outbreak of the First World War she read of the need for doctors in Serbia. The first phase of the Austro-Hungarian campaign against Serbia had resulted in the Serbian army suffering heavy casualties and a typhus epidemic among the military and the civilian populations. The epidemic reached its height in March 1915 when it was estimated that around 150,000 people were affected, of whom some 30,000 died.

Elizabeth Ross arrived in January 1915 and volunteered to work in Kragujevac, the city worst affected by the epidemic, accounting for almost 10 percent of all cases in Serbia. The large military hospital where she worked was overcrowded with typhus victims. The conditions under which Ross worked were described by Louise Fraser, a nurse who visited her from the nearby Scottish Women's Hospital, who wrote that she had seen "some of the worst slum dwellings in Britain, but never anything to approach these wards in filth and squalor."

At that time the louse-borne transmission of the disease was not fully understood, but the need for cleanliness, disinfection and isolation of victims was. These proved impossible to achieve in the military hospital at that time and the mortality rate from typhus in Kragujevac was particularly high, estimated by Colonel William Hunter of the British Military Sanitary Mission to Serbia at 40–50%.

== Death and legacy ==
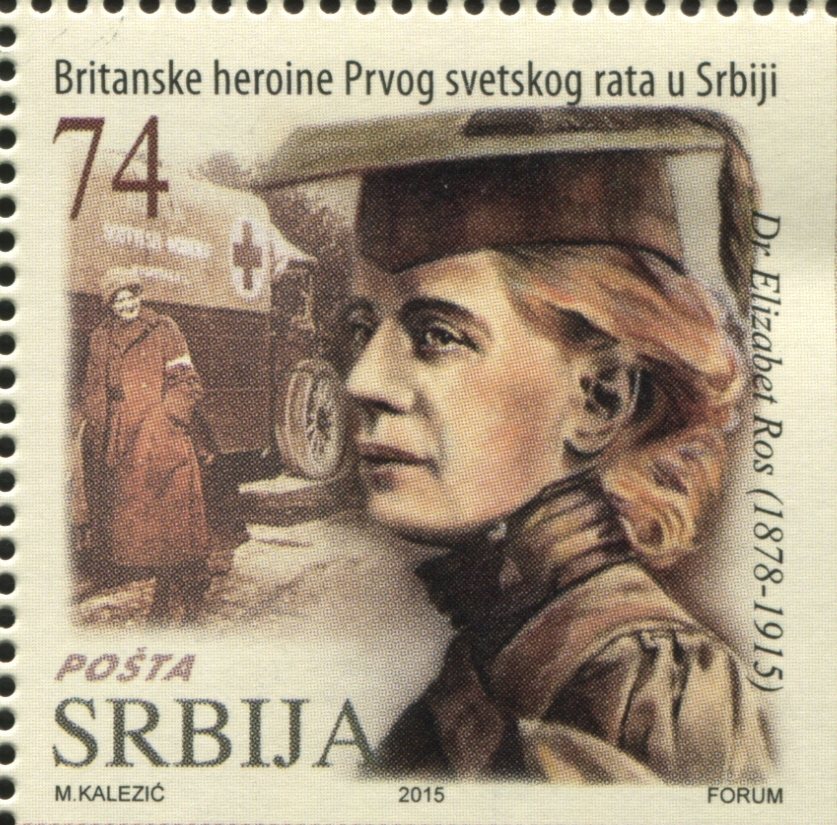
Serbian postage stamp of 2015 depicting Elizabeth Ross

Ross died from typhus on her 37th birthday, 14 February 1915, three weeks after arriving in Kragujevac. She is buried in the cemetery in Kragujevac, the inscription on her gravestone including, in Serbian, the text: "In memory of Dr. E. Ross and two nurses who died in 1915 in our town while attending to our ill and wounded soldiers. Grateful soldiers from the Saloniki front. Renewed 1977."

There is a plaque in her memory in St Duthac's Church, Tain. which includes the words "This tablet has been erected and hospital beds endowed in Serbia by public subscription in remembrance of the noble life and sacrifice of one whose home was for many years in Tain."

Ross was the first woman to be commemorated on Glasgow University's World War One Roll of Honour. A service was held in the Universirty Chapel on the centenary of her death.

In 2015, Ross was one of six British women to feature on a commemorative set of postage stamps issued by Serbia Post.

The local Red Cross youth branch in Kragujevac is named the Dr Elizabeth Ross Society. At the annual commemoration ceremony they wear t-shirts bearing Ross's graduation photograph. Elizabeth Ross Street in Kragujevac is named after her. A street in the town is named in her honour. On 14 February, her birth and death date, memorial ceremonies are held each year in Kragujevac and at other locations in Serbia to commemorate her work for the people of Serbia.

== See also ==
- People on Scottish banknotes
- Elsie Inglis Memorial Maternity Hospital
- Scottish Women's Hospitals for Foreign Service
- Eveline Haverfield – British suffragette and aid worker (1867–1920)
- Leila Paget – British humanitarian
- Mabel St Clair Stobart – British suffragist and aid-worker
- Josephine Bedford – Australian philanthropist and WWI ambulance driver (1861-1955)
- Katherine Harley – British suffragist
- Elsie Inglis – Scottish doctor (1864–1917)
- Isabel Emslie Hutton – Scottish physician (1887–1960)
