= Wee Free =

Scottish epithet

The term Wee Free was an epithet commonly used to distinguish two Scottish Presbyterian Churches after the union of 1900: The Free Kirk and The United Free Kirk. Since the United Free were approximately 25 times larger, but hard to distinguish without some knowledge of Scottish history and theology, the rhyming Scottish diminutive became used as an epithet of the post 1900 Free Kirk. The epithet Wee Free was also applied to a small group in the 1918 Liberal Party who on principle did not want to go into coalition with the Conservative Party. The Wee Free Liberals either did not get, or refused, the coupon signed by David Lloyd George of the Liberals and Bonar Law of the Conservatives. The Wee Free in modern usage is used, usually in a pejorative way, of any small group who because of their, arguably obscure, religious principles choose to remain without or separate from a larger body. A Wee Free attitude might show as a preference for being part of a smaller but ideologically pure group rather than a larger compromised one.

== Origin ==
In 1900 the Free Church had been the second largest Presbyterian church in Scotland since the 1843 Disruption, its exit from the "Auld Kirk" (the Church of Scotland). In the years leading up to 1900 the Free Kirk and the more theologically liberal United Presbyterian Church aligned themselves with each other, with full union as the goal. This led to Declaratory Articles being passed by their General Assemblies, changing or clarifying their doctrine so that there would be no barrier to union. The Free Kirk's Declaratory Act of 1892 was objected to by a minority some of whom formed the Free Presbyterian Church of Scotland, which continues to this day. Eight years later when Scotland's second and third largest Presbyterian denominations formally unified, a small group within the Free Church chose to stay outside the union. They were given the epithet the Wee Free Church (or Wee Frees) and, since they litigated for a share of the church's endowment through the Scottish Courts and right up to the House of Lords, they became well-known and the phrase passed into common usage. The Lords decision in the case of Bannatyne v Overtoun was in favour of the small body, a decision which surprised many.

== Background ==
A pair of rhyming jibes remain from the time of the heated split of the Disruption of 1843 when about a third of the Auld Kirk of Scotland left to form the Free Kirk. The Free Kirkers who had sometimes given up homes as well as church buildings and started financially from scratch were taunted with the rhyme: "The Free Kirk, the wee kirk the kirk without the steeple." This rhyme linking the Free Kirk with the derogatory diminutive "wee" was offensive and a reply was devised in: "The Auld Kirk, the cauld kirk, the kirk without the people." It may even have been known in America.

== Politics ==
The Wee Free Liberals, including Donald Maclean, were Liberals who did not go into the coalition of David Lloyd George with the Conservatives of Bonar Law when he took over as prime minister from H. H. Asquith (Asquith remained Liberal Party leader, although he was out of Parliament between the 1918 general election and the 1920 Paisley by-election). There were around 31 Wee Free MPs although political boundaries were not black and white.

== Modern usage ==
Denominations other than the Free Church are also regularly called Wee Frees in the press. For example, the epithet has been used about the Free Presbyterians, and even the United Free, a remnant of the very body the name was supposed to distinguish from, its greater part having united with the Church of Scotland in 1929. The Free Church has publicly tried to distance itself from the name, calling it a "derogatory and offensive slur". However, some people both inside and outside the denomination do not mind, even if it causes some to cringe. David Robertson, a Free Church minister, uses a version of it in his blog, called 'The Wee Flea.' This arose after well-known atheist, Richard Dawkins, called him, Alister McGrath and John Lennox ‘fleas living of a dogs back.’ Robertson then took the name 'the wee flea' as homage to that name and his church heritage.

== The Wee Wee Frees ==
Timeline showing the evolution of the churches of Scotland from 1560 including pejorative epithets

There is no group specifically known as the Wee Wee Frees. Groups coming out of the Free Church include the Free Presbyterian Church in 1893 from which the Associated Presbyterian Churches split in 1989. The Free Church (Continuing) sometimes is labelled with the derogatory Wee Wee Free or even Wee Wee Wee Free term.

== In literature ==
Terry Pratchett's Wee Free Men is an epithet for his Nac Mac Feegle who appear in some of his Discworld novels. He denied they are caricatures of Scots or churchmen, saying, "The Nac Mac Feegle are not Scottish. There is no Scotland on Discworld. They may, in subtle ways, suggest some aspects of the Scottish character as filtered through the media, but that's because of quantum."

== See also ==
- Ecclesiastical separatism
- Protestantism
- Schism
- Sectarianism
