= Independent Liberal Party (UK, 1918) =

Former British political party, established 1918

The Independent Liberal Party is a name used for the Parliamentary Liberal Party created in 1918 and led by H. H. Asquith, in opposition to the Coalition government led by the Liberal David Lloyd George. The Coalition candidates (whether Conservatives or Liberal) were marked at the 1918 election by the Coalition Coupon. In fact, the parliamentary party was not independent from the Liberal Party, of which it formed part. Rather, it was independent of Lloyd George. It was sometimes known by the epithet the Wee Free Party.

The issuing of the Coalition Coupon to some Liberals, but not to others, led Asquith's followers to form a Parliamentary Liberal Party in opposition to them, so that in most constituencies the election of 1918 saw a three-way contest between the Coalition Government, the Independent Liberal Party, and the Labour Party.

After the 1918 election, the party remained in existence in parliament until 1922, although greatly weakened. Only 28 were returned, and even Asquith himself lost his East Fife seat. Between 1918 and 1922, there were twenty-four three-cornered parliamentary by-elections, but in each of them the Independent Liberal candidates polled only between 24 and 28 per cent of the votes.
