= Abbot of Fearn =

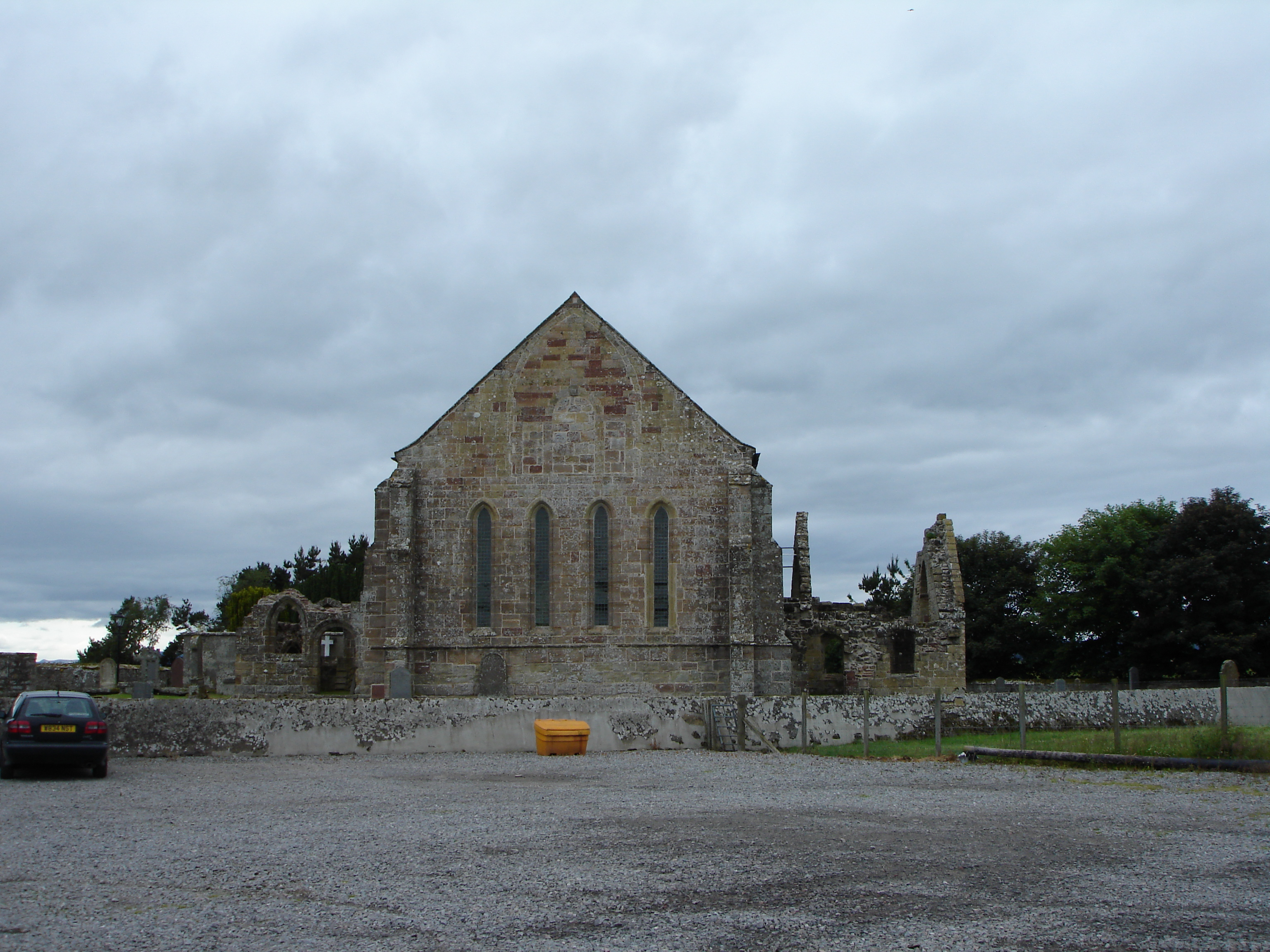
The ruins of Fearn Abbey today, adjacent to the church.

The Abbot of Fearn was the head of the Premonstratensian monastic community of Fearn Abbey, Easter Ross, Scotland. The Abbey was founded by canons from Whithorn Priory in Galloway, with the patronage of Fearchar mac an t-Sagairt, mormaer/earl of Ross. The foundation took place in the 1220s, according to the two distinct foundation dates given in the sources, either in 1221 or in 1227. Until about 1238, the Abbey was located at Fearn ("next to Kincaard in Stracharrin"), near Edderton, but it was moved to the Tarbat parish in that year and known thereafter as "nova Furnia". Despite the fact that the head of Whithorn Priory was a prior and Fearn an abbot, Fearn seems to have remained subordinate to Whithorn until at least the end of the 14th century, and even in 1440 Abbot Fionnlagh II was confirmed by the prior of Whithorn.The reason for this is that Whithorn was a cathedral priory; the nominal head of its community was the bishop, but its actual head was the prior, as was the common use in England at places like Durham and Carlisle, but this was not usual in Scotland. In these circumstances the cathedral prior had the same rights as an ordinary abbot.

Little is known about the history of the abbots, and not all seem to be known by name. Fearn served for several centuries as a small but productive abbey, and served as the burial site for the Earls of Ross. Monastic life began to decline after the Bishop of Caithness, a Church official named John Sinclair, put Fearn in Commendam by use of a falsified ecclesiastical document in 1490 and removed Fearn's abbot, Thomas MacCulloch, O. Praem. Several commendatory (and non-ecclesiastical) abbots ruled Fearn for several decades, but only for its financial benefits. Ross-shire went officially Presbyterian in 1560, and monastic life vanished completely. The Abbey property was taken over by the bishopric of Ross in 1609. The following is a list of abbots and commendators:

== List of abbots ==
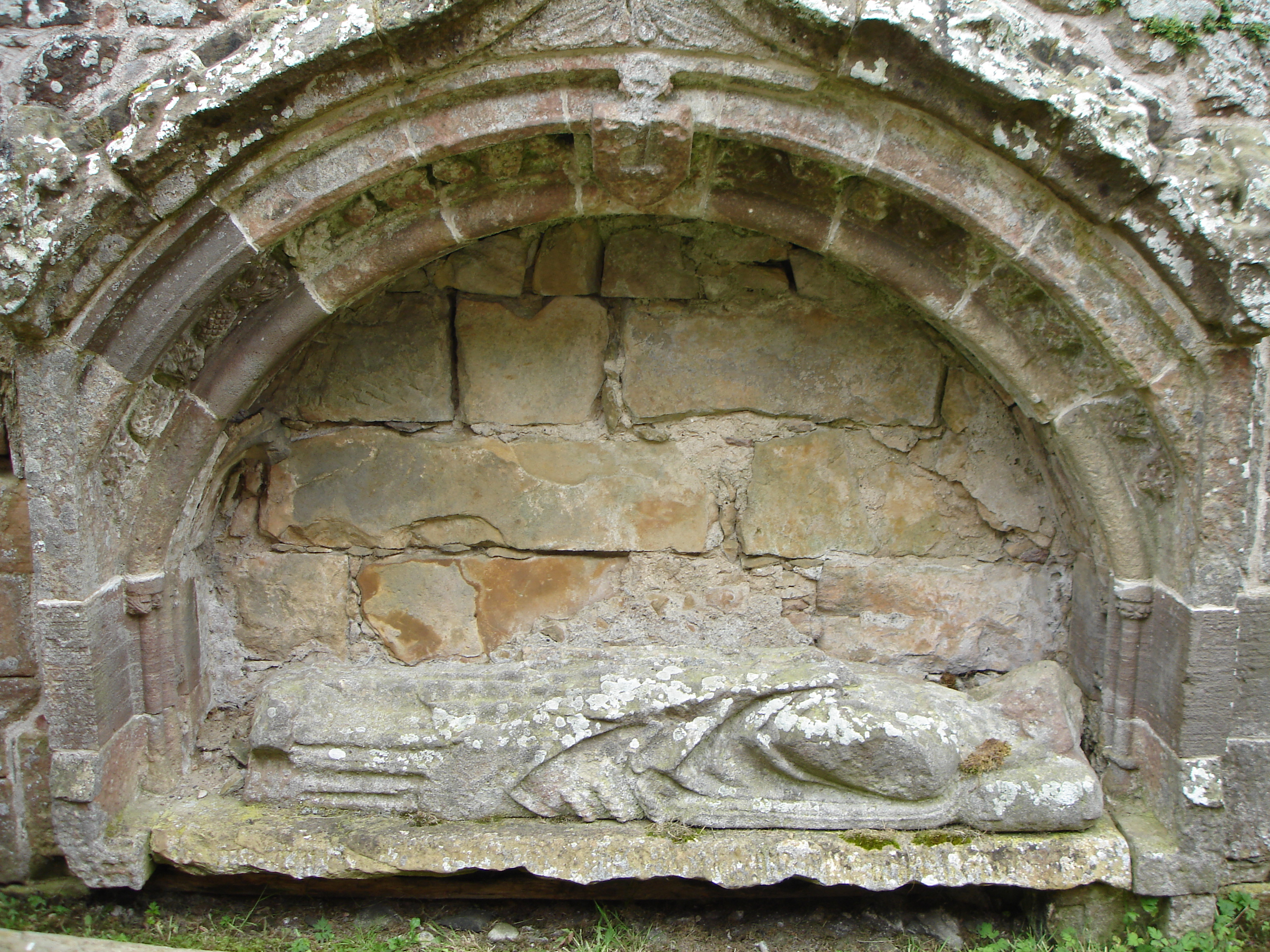
Tomb of abbot Fionnlagh II.

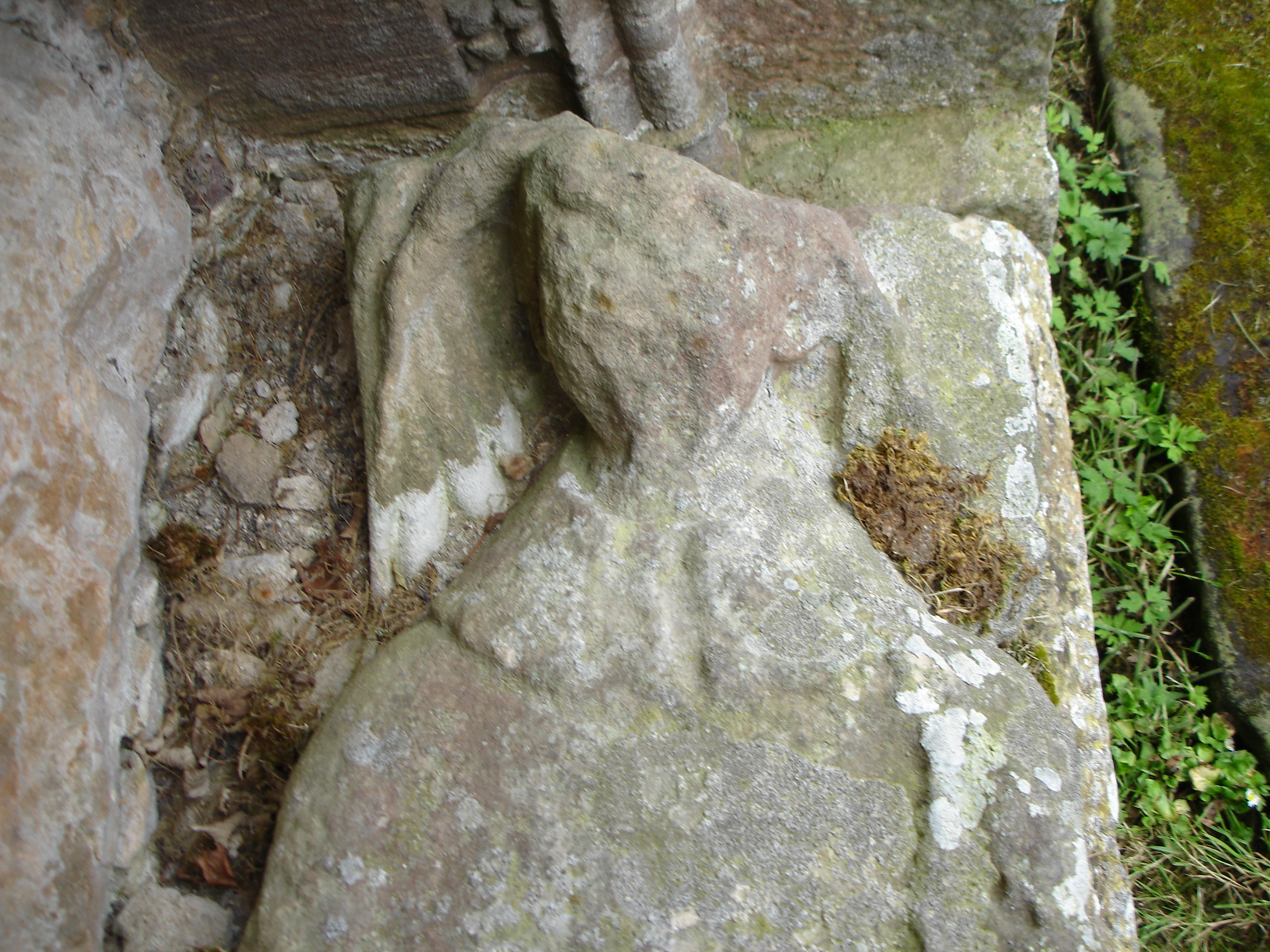
Head-effigy of abbot Fionnlagh II.

- Maol Choluim (I) of Whithorn, 1220s or 1230s
- Maol Choluim (II) of Nigg, x 1251
- Macbeathad ("Machabeus") "Makhersin", 1251 x 1274
- Colin, 1255 x 1271
- Martein (Martin), 1299x1311
- John, 1299x1321
- Mark Ross, 1321 -1338
- Domhnall ("Donaldus") Pupill, 1345x1371 -1373
- Adam Monilaw, 1380 -1407
- Thomas Kiethirnathie, 1407x
- Fionnlagh (I) (or Finlay), 1436
- Fionnlagh (II) (Finlay McFaed), 1439-1483 x 1486
- Thomas MacCulloch, 1486–1490
- Nicholas Slugy, fl. 1491

== List of commendators ==
- Andrew Stewart, 1508-1517
- Patrick Hamilton, 1517–1526
- Donald Denoon, 1525–1541
- Robert Cairncross, 1541-1545
- David Paniter, 1545
- James Cairncross, 1545–1550
- Nicholas Ross, 1550–1569
- Thomas Ross, 1566–1596
- Walter Ross of Morangie, 15 84
- Patrick Gordon of Letterfourie, 1591
- Patrick Murray of Geanies, 1598

== Bibliography ==
- History of Fearn Abbey, published by Church of Scotland Fearn Abbey (available in church)
- Cowan, Ian B. & Easson, David E., Medieval Religious Houses: Scotland With an Appendix on the Houses in the Isle of Man, Second Edition, (London, 1976), pp. 101–02
- Watt, D. E. R. & Shead, N. F. (eds.), The Heads of Religious Houses in Scotland from the 12th to the 16th Centuries, The Scottish Records Society, New Series, Volume 24, (Edinburgh, 2001), p. 80-3
