= Ardjachie Stone =

Stone with ancient decoration in Easter Ross, Scotland

Coordinates: 57°49′55″N 4°5′55″W

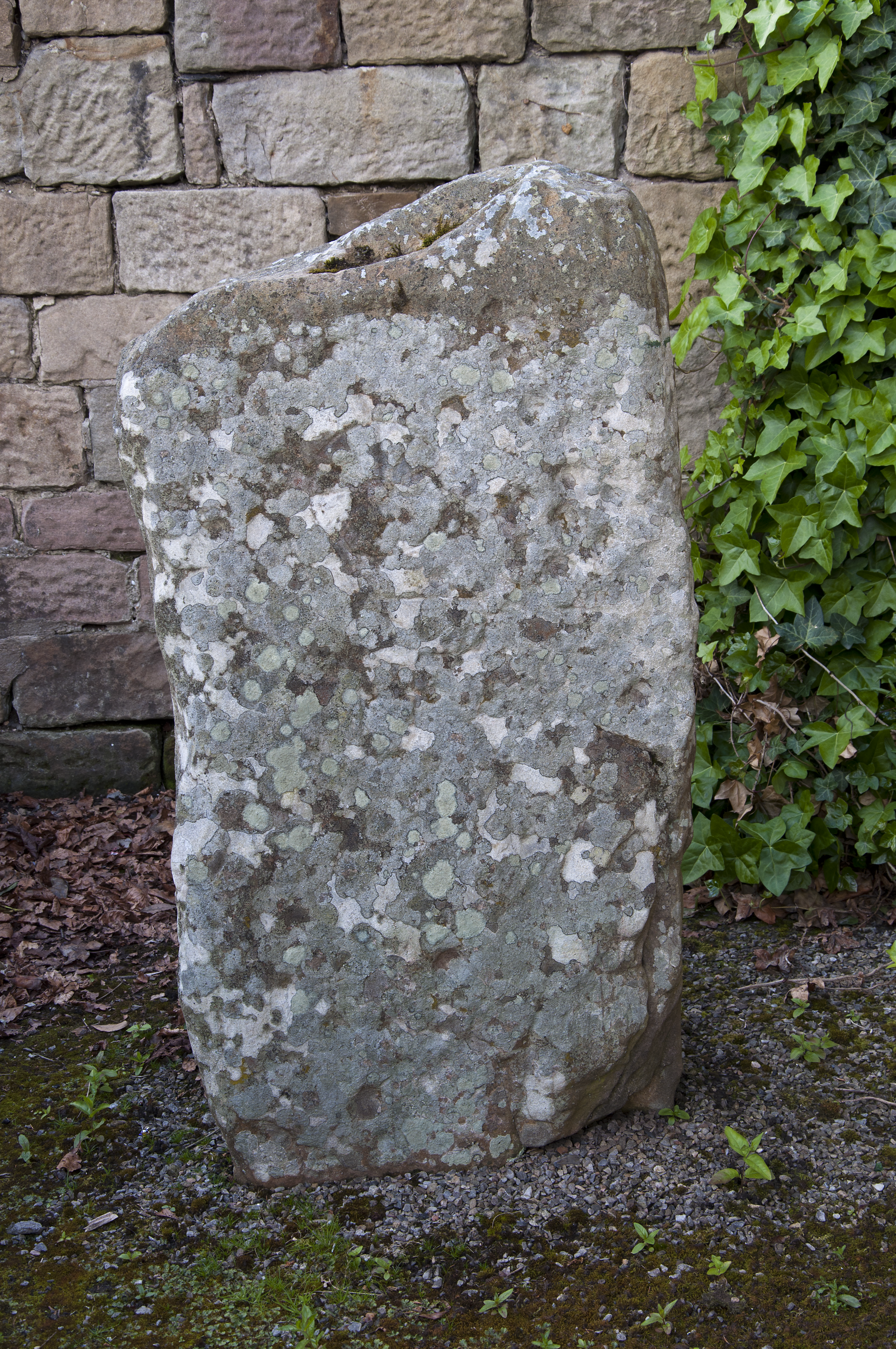
Ardjachie Stone

The Ardjachie Stone is an uncut but decorated red sandstone boulder discovered by farmers in 1960 on the Ardjachie Farm in the Tarbat peninsula of Easter Ross. It now stands outside of the museum of Tain. On it are depicted several dozen cup or ring marks probably dating to the Bronze Age. It also has an inverted-L design with a wheel image above, both of probable Pictish origin. It therefore may be considered a Class I Pictish stone.
