= Tain Tolbooth =

Municipal building in Tain, Scotland

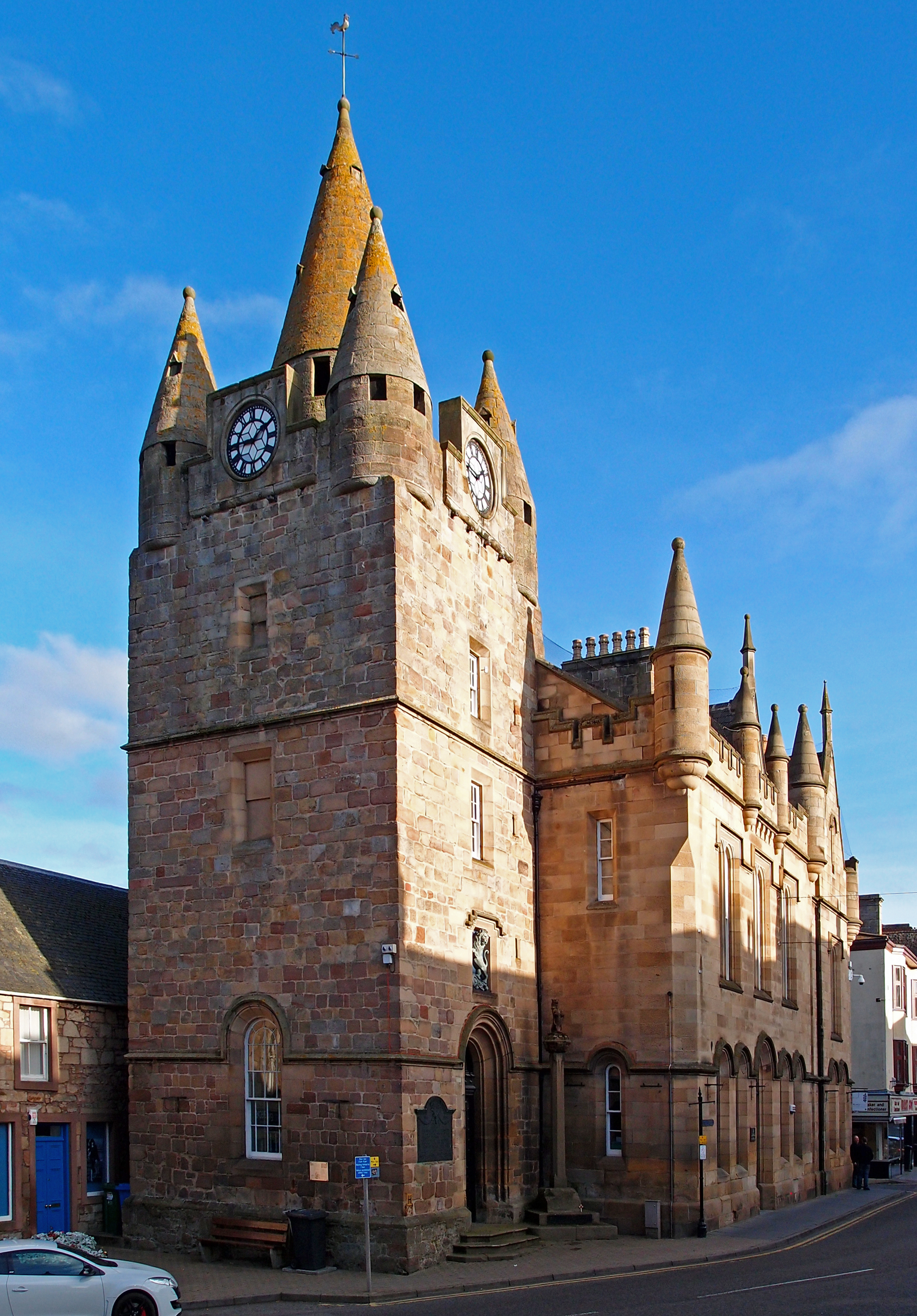
- Tain Tolbooth

- Shown in Highland
- 57.8120°N 4.0548°W
- Location: High Street, Tain

History
- Built: 1708

Site notes
- Architect: Alexander Stronach
- Architectural style: Scottish baronial style

Listed Building – Category A
- Official name: Tain Sheriff Court and Justice of the Peace Court, including Tolbooth, High Street, Tain
- Designated: 25 March 1971
- Reference no.: LB41867

Tain Tolbooth is a municipal building in the High Street, Tain, Highland, Scotland. The structure, which is used as a courthouse, is a Category A listed building.

== History ==
The first municipal building in Tain was a medieval tolbooth which was instigated by the then provost, John McCullough, in 1631. A bell, cast by the Dutch foundryman, Michael Burgerhuys of Middelburg, was specially made in time for its opening. The non-conformist minister, Thomas Ross was incarcerated in the tolbooth between 1675 and 1676. However, it became necessary to demolish the old tolbooth after the steeple collapsed in a storm in 1703.

The current tolbooth was designed by Alexander Stronach in the Scottish baronial style, built in coursed stone and was completed in 1708. The design involved a three-stage tower facing onto the High Street. The tower contained small sash windows in the second and third stages. The tolbooth was accompanied by a two-storey council house, extending southeast along the High Street, which was also completed in 1708. The upper part of the tolbooth was enhanced by the addition of corner bartizans and a spire in 1733. The bell, which had been recovered from the old tolbooth, was installed in the third stage of the tower in 1733 and a clock was installed there in 1750.

In 1751, William Ross, who was the son of the 18th Chief of Clan Ross, was arrested and incarcerated in the tolbooth for wearing highland dress and, in 1829, three prisoners escaped from the building.

The old two-storey council house, extending along the High Street, was demolished in the early 1820s. The foundation stone for a new courthouse was laid in 1825: it was designed by Alexander Gordon and completed in around 1826 but was destroyed in a fire, just six years later, in 1833. The current courthouse was designed by Thomas Brown, built in ashlar stone and was completed in 1843. The design involved an asymmetrical main frontage of four bays facing onto the High Street. There was a round headed doorway in the second bay from the left and the right-hand bay was gabled and slightly projected forward. The building was fenestrated by pairs of round headed windows on the ground floor and bi-partite mullioned windows on the first floor. At roof level, there was a crenelated parapet with corner turrets. Internally, the principal room was the courtroom on the ground floor at the front of the building.

Modifications made the tolbooth in the 19th century included the installation, in 1848, of a new doorway and a panel above it bearing a Lion rampant. The courthouse was extended to the rear with an additional four-bay block, which was built to a design by Andrew Maitland and completed in 1876. A new clock was installed in the tower of the tolbooth in 1877. The complex continued to accommodate the council chamber of the burgh council for much of the 20th century, but ceased to be the local seat of government after the enlarged Ross and Cromarty District Council was formed in 1975. Instead, the council chamber became the meeting place of the Royal Burgh of Tain Community Council. The building also continues to serve as the venue for hearings of Tain Sheriff Court.

Works of art in the complex include a portrait, painted in 1907 by George Fiddes Watt, of Alexander Wallace who was Honorary Sheriff Substitute for Ross and Cromarty and Sutherland.

== See also ==
- List of listed buildings in Tain, Highland
- List of Category A listed buildings in Highland
