= Fearn, Highland =

Coordinates: 57.771°N 3.954°W

Fearn: Scottish Gaelic: Manachainn Rois
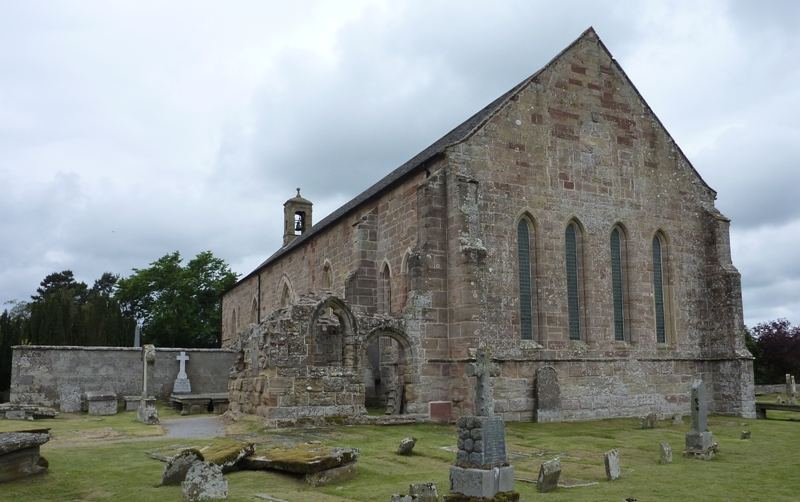
- Fearn Abbey

- Location within the Ross and Cromarty area
- OS grid reference: NH837769
- Council area: Highland
- Country: Scotland
- Sovereign state: United Kingdom
- Post town: Tain
- Postcode district: IV20 1
- Police: Scotland
- Fire: Scottish
- Ambulance: Scottish

Fearn (Scottish Gaelic: Manachainn Rois) is a hamlet, situated 1 mile (1.6 km) south of Loch Eye and 2 miles (3.2 km) northwest of Balintore, in eastern Ross-shire, Scottish Highlands and is in the Scottish council area of Highland. The buildings in the hamlet are mostly cottages with walls constructed of boulders and clay.

Fearn Abbey was erected in the hamlet in 1238 by Farquhar, first Earl of Ross, and rebuilt in 1771 after its roof collapsed in 1742. Church was built on its ruins in 1771.

The larger village of Hill of Fearn lies directly northeast of the hamlet.

The former RNAS Fearn (HMS Owl) is to the south of the hamlet.
