= Coalition Coupon =

1918 endorsement of UK MPs by the Coalition government

The Coalition Coupon was a letter sent to parliamentary candidates at the 1918 United Kingdom general election, endorsing them as official representatives of the Coalition Government. The 1918 election took place soon after British victory in the First World War. Receiving the coupon was interpreted by the electorate as a sign of patriotism that helped candidates gain election, while those who did not receive it had a more difficult time as they were sometimes seen as anti-war or pacifist. The letters were all dated 20 November 1918 and were signed by Prime Minister David Lloyd George for the Coalition Liberals and Bonar Law, the leader of the Conservative Party. As a result, the 1918 general election has become known as "the coupon election".

The name "coupon" was coined by Liberal leader H. H. Asquith, disparagingly using the jargon of rationing with which people were familiar in the context of wartime shortages.

== Text of the letter ==
The letters all contained the same simple text:

Dear ...

We have much pleasure in recognizing you as the Coalition Candidate for (name of constituency). We have every hope that the Electors will return you as their Representative in Parliament to support the government in the great task which lies before it.

Yours truly,

D. Lloyd George

A. Bonar Law

Some coalition candidates included the wording of the letter in their election addresses.

== Recipients ==
Following confidential negotiations between Lloyd George's coalition Chief Whip, Freddie Guest, and George Younger, chairman of the Conservative Party, over the summer of 1918, it was agreed that 150 Liberals were to be offered the support of the prime minister and the leader of the Conservative Party at the next general election.

According to the figures recorded in Trevor Wilson's book The Downfall of the Liberal Party, 159 Liberal candidates received the coupon. A few of these were Independent Liberals, supporters of Asquith. Of those Liberals receiving the coupon 136 were elected, whereas only 29 who did not receive the coupon were returned to Parliament.

In addition to the Liberal and Conservative candidates who received the coupon, some letters were also sent to Labour supporters of the Coalition (although most were repudiated by the official Labour Party) and some to members of the National Democratic Party.

== Impact on Liberal candidates ==
As Margaret Cole's memoir of the time makes clear, many competent and patriotic candidates who did not receive the coupon, including sitting Liberal and Labour MPs, found themselves categorised as somehow anti-war or pacifist as a result. Percy Harris, who had been MP for Harborough since 1916, recorded that once the coupon had been allocated to his Conservative opponent it was interpreted as a personal reflection upon him by his constituents who assumed he must have done something wrong for the Liberal Prime Minister to be seen offering his open support to a rival.

Most historians have since agreed that the coupon essentially sealed the fate of those Liberals who were not fortunate enough to receive the Coalition's backing. Those Liberals that Lloyd George chose to abandon were left defenceless against Coalition candidates, who had a full claim on the spirit of national unity and patriotism that characterised Britain's war weary mood following the end of hostilities.

The election result was catastrophic for these Asquithian Independent Liberals, who retained only 13% of their seats in the Coupon election. Only 28 were returned, and even Asquith lost the seat he had held in East Fife since the 1886 general election.
