= Fearn Abbey =

Monastery in Highland, Scotland

Coordinates: 57°46′12.29″N 3°57′22.09″W

Abbey of New Fearn
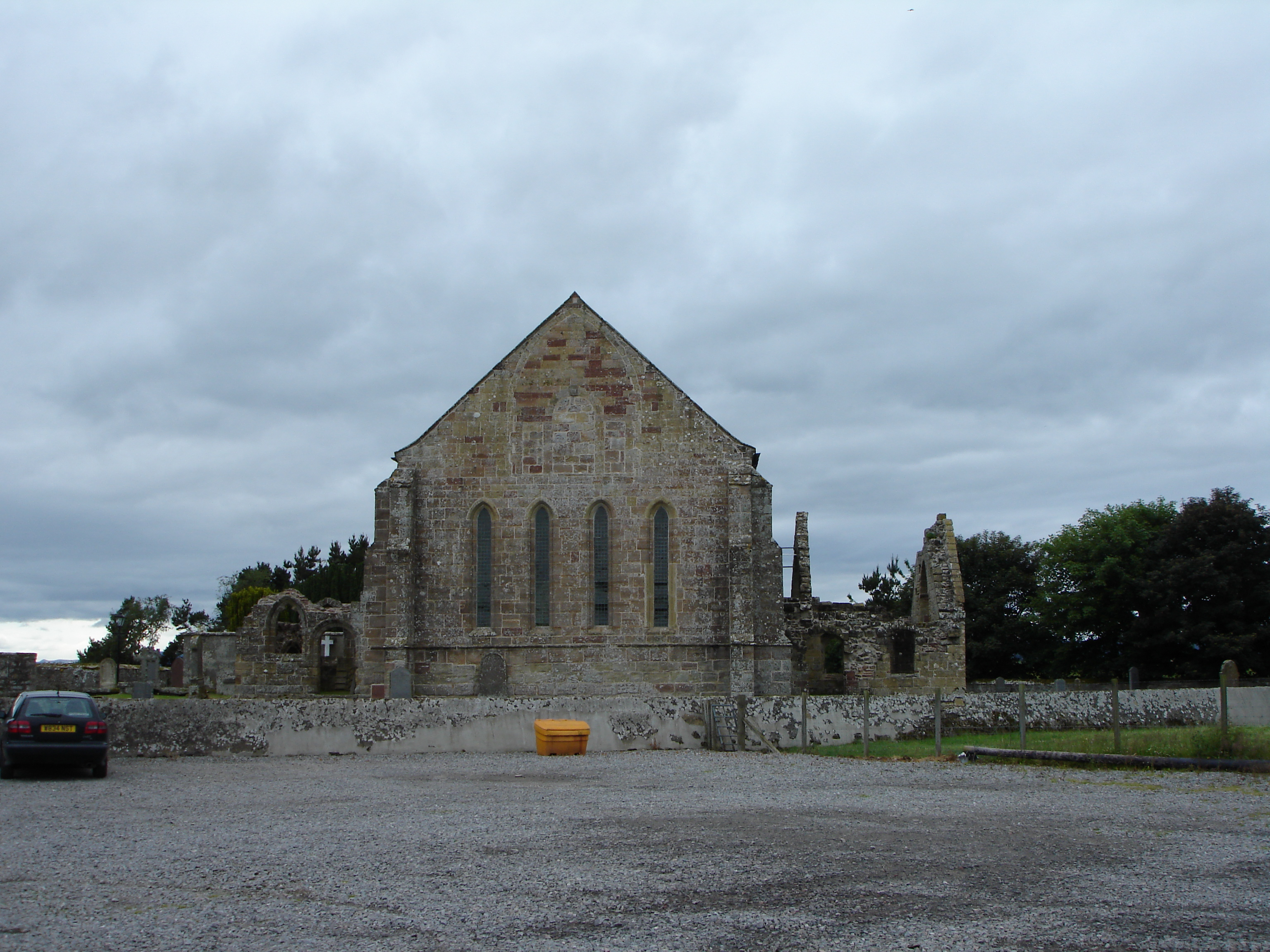

Monastery information
- Order: Premonstratensian
- Established: 1238
- Disestablished: 1609
- Mother house: Whithorn Priory
- Diocese: Diocese of Ross
- Controlled churches: Kilchrist, Tarbat

People
- Founder(s): Fearchar, Earl of Ross
- Important associated figures: Finlay McFaed

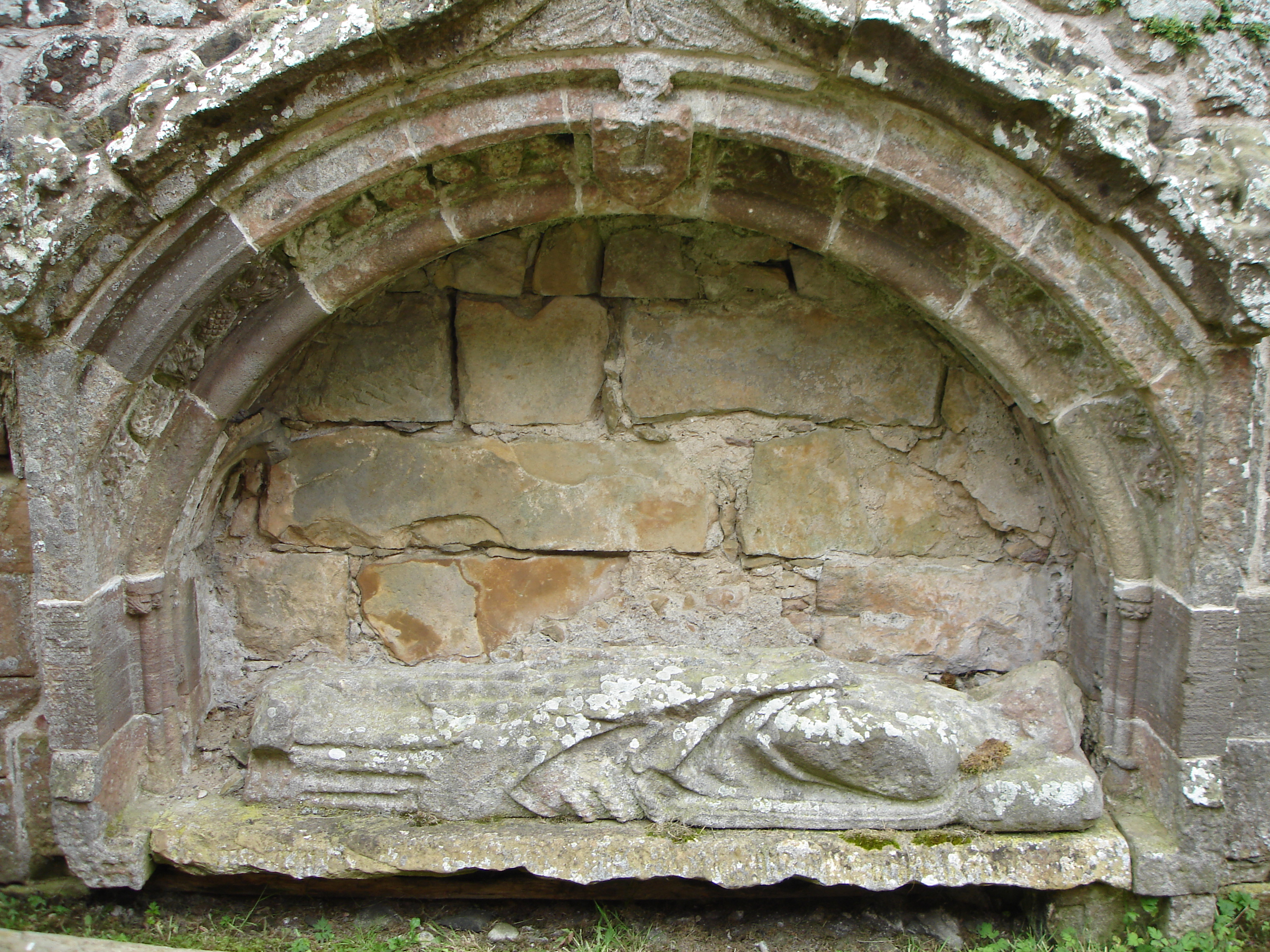
Tomb of abbot Fionnlagh II (Finlay McFaed).

Fearn Abbey – known as "The Lamp of the North" – has its origins in one of Scotland's oldest pre-Reformation church buildings. Part of the Church of Scotland and located to the southeast of Tain, Ross-shire, the historic building ceased to be used for church services in 2023, with remaining local church services and meetings to be held in the adjacent modern church hall. In 2024 the parish (previously united with Nigg and linked with Tarbat), was united with the former parishes of Tarbat (Portmahomack) and Tain to form Easter Ross Peninsula Church of Scotland.

== Design ==
The church is extremely simple in design. It is oblong in shape, 96 feet long and 26 feet wide internally. The windows are tall lancets. In the east gable there are four lancets equal in height, and similar openings appear in pairs between all the buttresses around the wall. The eastern end was partitioned off and set aside as the burial vault of the family of Ross of Balnagown. The chapels or aisles attached to the church were erected at later dates against the original walls.

The most important addition to the building was the south wing, a chapel dedicated to St Michael, which was probably erected by Abbot Finlay McFead (d. 1485). It is 32 feet long by 23 feet wide and is connected to the main building by an archway 14 feet wide. On the west side is a doorway; on the east side, an ambry, or recess; on the south side, a canopied monument to Abbot Finlay, which displays the abbot's shield and the inscription: “Hic jacet Finlaius McFaed abbas de Fern qui obit anno MCCCCLXXXV” (Here lies Finlay McFaed, abbot of Fearn, who died in the year 1485).

A small monumental chapel was erected, probably in the sixteenth century, against the southeast angle of the church, blocking two of the windows. Another chapel was built against the north wall of the church. The cloister and domestic buildings no longer survive.

Over the centuries, the rope of the church bell has worn a deep crevice into the stones of the church wall beneath the bell tower.

== History ==
=== Medieval period ===
The original Fearn Abbey was established during the reign of Alexander II by Premonstratensians from Whithorn Priory, a monastery of white canons, who provided the first abbot. The Abbey was originally settled by Fearchar, 1st Earl of Ross, in the 1220s but was moved ten miles to the southeast in 1238 during the time of the second abbot, Malcolm of Nigg. The move was deemed necessary because of the turbulence created by the northern clans, but the richer soil for agriculture was also a boon. The Abbey was within the domains of the earls of Ross, who maintained and protected it over the years.

In 1321, Mark, a canon of Whithorn, was presented to the abbacy by the prior of Withorn, rather than being elected by the canons. On the orders of William III, Earl of Ross, the rebuilding of the Abbey was begun during Abbot Mark's time in 1338, and completed during the tenure of Abbot Donald Pupill in 1372. During the forty-four year tenure of Abbot Finlay McFaed (1442-1485), numerous improvements were made. A cloister was added and the Abbey was enriched by an organ, tabernacles, chalices, vestments, and other embellishments from Flanders.

=== Reformation era ===
In the early sixteenth century, the commendatorship was assumed by Patrick Hamilton, a boy at the time. Hamilton, who adopted Reformation principles, was burned as a heretic at the age of twenty-six in 1528. In 1539, King James V recommended to Pope Paul III that Robert Cairncross, Bishop of Ross, be appointed abbot of Fearn, primarily because Cairncross, as a man of wealth, was deemed capable of restoring the buildings, which had fallen into disrepair. Nicholas Ross, provost of the collegiate church of Tain, held the abbacy after the death of Cairncross in 1545. He is thought to have held the position as a secular charge since he sat in Parliament in 1560 and voted for the abolition of Catholicism in Scotland.

=== Post-Reformation era ===
In 1587, during the commendatorship of Walter Ross of Morangy, son of Abbot Thomas Ross, the lands were resumed by the Crown. The Abbey was granted to Patrick Gordon of Letterfourie in 1591. Fearn was erected into the barony of Geanies in favor of Sir Patrick Murray by James VI in 1598. In 1609, it was annexed to the see of Ross for Bishop David Lindsay, and, in 1616, to Bishop Patrick Lindsay, as confirmed by Act of Parliament on 28 June 1617. The grants were confirmed to Bishop John Maxwell by Charles I in 1633.

Following the Reformation, the Abbey remained in use as a parish church, but disaster struck in 1742 when the flagstone roof collapsed during a service, killing nearly fifty members of the congregation. Though a new church was built adjacent to the ruined church, it too had fallen into a ruinous state by the early 1770s. As a result, part of the original ruined Abbey was rebuilt in 1772, and the Abbey again became the parish church as part of the established Protestant Church of Scotland.

=== 20th and 21st centuries ===
The current building substantially dates from the restoration of 1772, but still incorporates parts of the medieval structure. It was restored by Ian G. Lindsay & Partners in 1971. Further restoration was carried out in 2002–2003 under the auspices of Historic Scotland. The congregation of Fearn Abbey take part in outreach work in the local area and have active links to the Church of Scotland's World Mission projects in Ekwendeni, Malawi, and the Tabeetha School in Israel.

== Burials ==
In addition to Abbot Finlay McFaed, well-known persons buried in Fearn Abbey include the following:

- Fearchar, 1st Earl of Ross, the founder of the Abbey, d. 1251
- Sir Mark Ross, Abbot of Fearn Abbey, d. c 1350
- Thomas Ross of Culnahal, Provost of the Collegiate Church of Tain and Vicar of Alness, who was forced by oppression from neighboring barons to reside for many years in Forres, d. 1591
- General Charles Ross of Balnagown, honoured for his military prowess in the time of William III and Mary II, d. 1732
- Sir John Lockhart-Ross, 6th Baronet, Admiral of the Royal Navy, d. 1790

== See also ==
- Abbot of Fearn, for a list of abbots and commendators
- List of Church of Scotland parishes

== Bibliography ==
- Church of Scotland Yearbook and Churches to Visit in Scotland, ISBN 0-86153-292-9.
- The White Canons of St. Norbert, by Cornelius James Kirkfleet, O. Praem., 1943.
