= Tain =

Coordinates: 57.81178°N 4.05670°W

Tain: Scottish Gaelic: Baile Dhubhthaich
- Market town, Royal burgh, and Parish
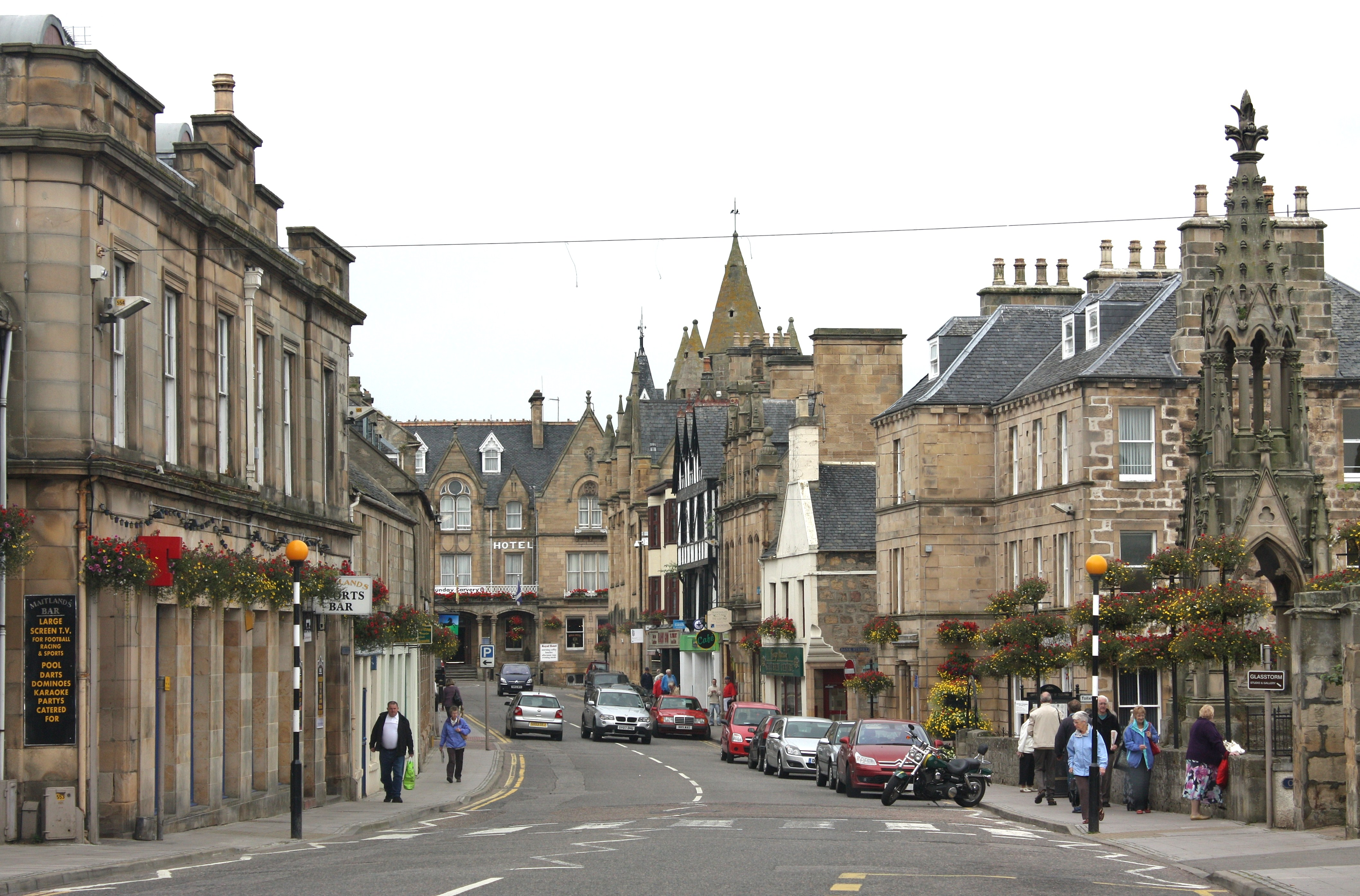
- High Street

- Location within the Highland council area
- Area: 2.12 km^{2} (0.82 sq mi)
- Population: 3,548 (2022)
  - Density: 1,674/km^{2} (4,340/sq mi)
- OS grid reference: NH779821
  - Edinburgh: 133 mi (214 km)
  - London: 463 mi (745 km)
- Council area: Highland
- Lieutenancy area: Ross and Cromarty
- Country: Scotland
- Sovereign state: United Kingdom
- Post town: TAIN
- Postcode district: IV19
- Dialling code: 01862
- Police: Scotland
- Fire: Scottish
- Ambulance: Scottish
- UK Parliament: Caithness, Sutherland and Easter Ross
- Scottish Parliament: Caithness, Sutherland and Ross

Tain (Scottish Gaelic: Baile Dhubhthaich [palə ˈɣuhɪç]) is a market town, royal burgh and parish in the County of Ross, in the Highlands of Scotland. It is approximately 133 miles (214 km) north of Edinburgh, 135 miles (217 km) north-northeast of Glasgow, and 24 miles (38 km) north-northeast of Inverness. It had a population of 3,548 in 2022.

== Etymology ==
The name derives from the nearby River Tain, the name of which comes from an Indo-European root meaning 'flow'. The Gaelic name, Baile Dubhthaich, means 'Duthac's town', after a local saint also known as Duthus.

== History ==
Tain was granted its first royal charter in 1066, making it Scotland's oldest royal burgh, commemorated in 1966 with the opening of the Rose Garden by Queen Elizabeth, the Queen Mother. The 1066 charter, granted by King Malcolm III, confirmed Tain as a sanctuary, where people could claim the protection of the church, and an immunity, in which resident merchants and traders were exempt from certain taxes.

Little is known of earlier history although the town owed much of its importance to Duthac. He was an early Christian figure, perhaps 8th or 9th century, whose shrine had become so important by 1066 that it resulted in the royal charter. The ruined chapel near the mouth of the river was said to have been built on the site of his birth. Duthac became an official saint in 1419 and by the late Middle Ages his shrine was an important place of pilgrimage in Scotland. King James IV came at least once a year throughout his reign to achieve both spiritual and political aims.

A leading landowning family of the area, the Clan Munro, provided political and religious figures to the town, including the dissenter the Rev. John Munro of Tain (died ca. 1630).

The early Duthac Chapel was the centre of a sanctuary. Fugitives were by tradition given sanctuary in several square miles marked by boundary stones. During the First War of Scottish Independence, Robert the Bruce sent his wife and daughter to the sanctuary for safety. The sanctuary was violated and they were captured by forces loyal to William II, Earl of Ross who handed them over to Edward I of England.

== Facilities ==
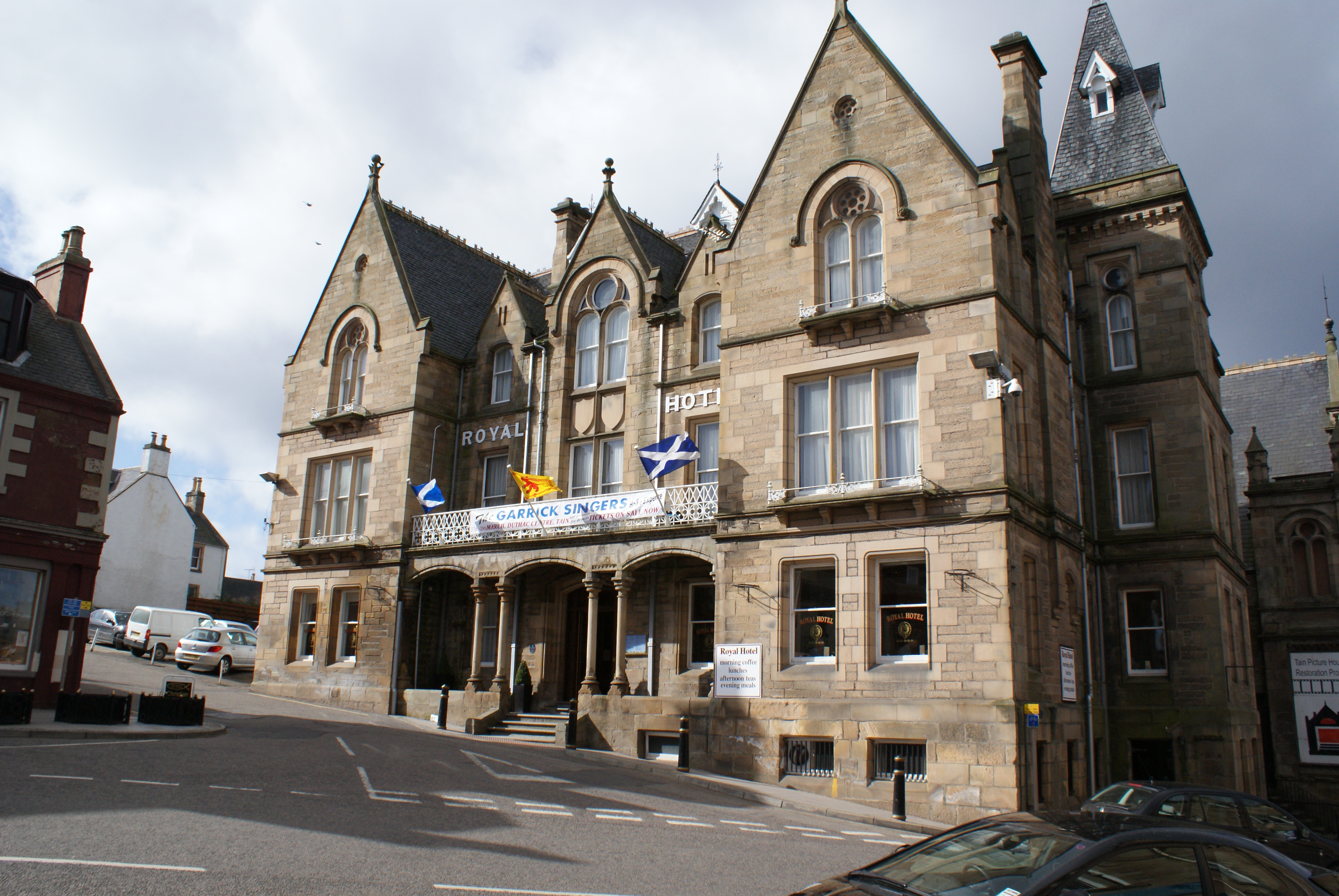
The Royal Hotel

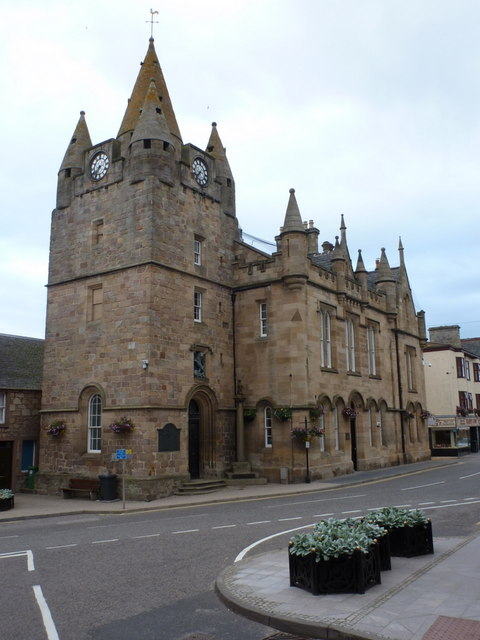
Tain Tolbooth

Tain railway station is on the Far North Line. The station is unstaffed; in its heyday it had 30 staff. The station was opened by the Highland Railway on 1 January 1864. From 1 January 1923, the station was owned by the London Midland and Scottish Railway. Then in 1948 the British railways were nationalised as British Railways. After the railways were privatised, the station was served by ScotRail.

Notable buildings in the town include Tain Tolbooth and St Duthus Collegiate Church. The town also has a local history museum, Tain Through Time, and the Glenmorangie distillery.

Tain has two primary schools; Craighill (274 pupils as of April 2011) and Knockbreck (just under 120 pupils as of April 2011). There is also a secondary school, Tain Royal Academy, with 590 pupils as of January 2017.

== RAF Tain ==
With conflict looming in the 1930s, an aerodrome large enough for bombers was built next to the town on low alluvial land known as the Fendom bordering the Dornoch Firth. It was home to British, Czech (311 Sqn) and Polish airmen during the Second World War.

It was abandoned as a flying location after the war and converted to a bombing range for the Fleet Air Arm. In 1939 RAF Lossiemouth opened and was used until 1946 when the airfield was transferred to the Admiralty and becoming Royal Naval Air Station (RNAS) Lossiemouth then returning to the RAF in 1972 as an RAF airfield and the Tain range reverted to the RAF. Large parts of the original aerodrome were returned to civilian use after the Second World War and some are still accessible.

== Sport & recreation ==
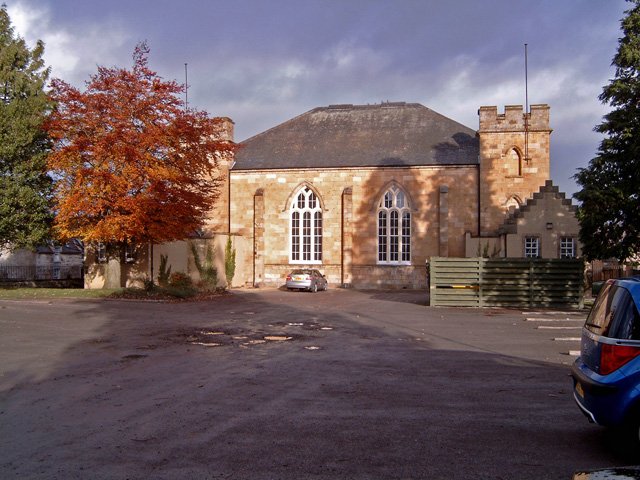
The St Duthac Centre, Stafford Street

Tain Golf Club offers a Championship length links golf course. Overlooking the Dornoch Firth, the course was first designed by Old Tom Morris in 1890.

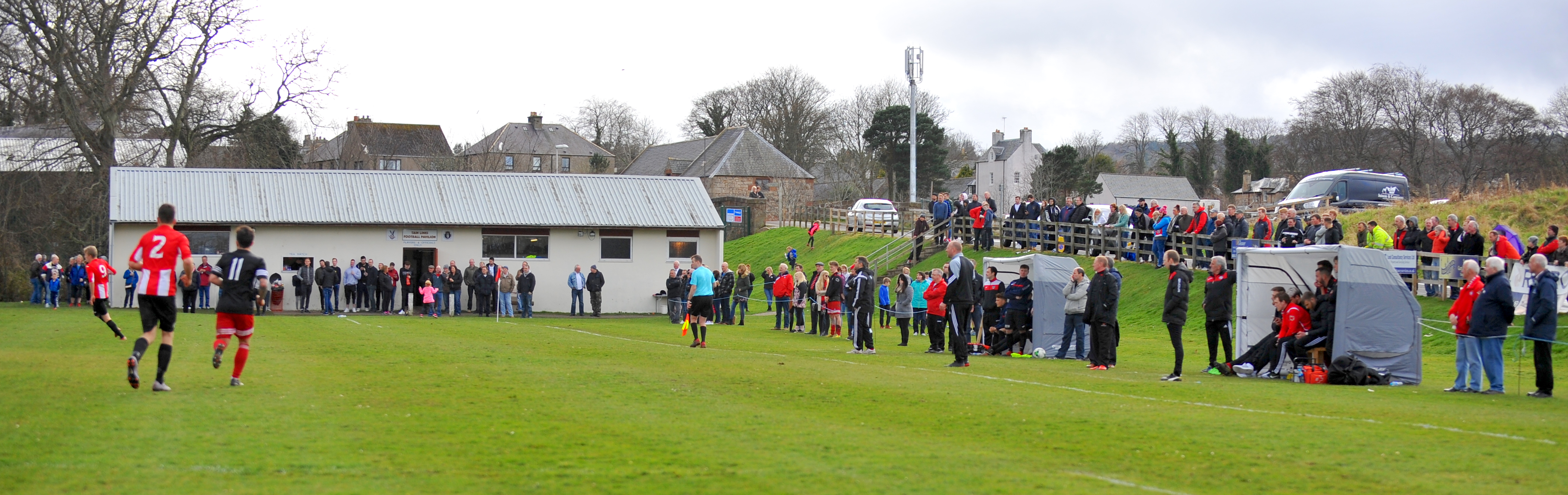
St Duthus v Brora Rangers April 2017

Tain is represented in the Scottish Football Association affiliated North Caledonian Football League by senior football club St Duthus Football Club during the regular football season.

== Local geographical and visitor features ==
The Gizzen Briggs are sandbars at the entrance to the Dornoch Firth, and with the right wind, they can be heard at low tide. The so-called "million dollar view" to the north-west of Tain, accessible via the A836 westward towards Bonar Bridge and then the B9176 Struie Road, gives a panoramic view of Dornoch Firth and Sutherland.

Five important castles are in the vicinity – Carbisdale Castle, built for the Dowager Duchess of Sutherland and now a youth hostel; Skibo Castle, once home of the industrialist Andrew Carnegie and now a hotel; Dunrobin Castle, ancestral seat of the Duke of Sutherland (castle and gardens open to the public); Balnagown Castle, ancestral seat of the Clan Ross, restored and owned by Mohammed Al Fayed; and Ballone Castle, restored by the owners of a local crafts business.

Highland Fine Cheeses, run by Ruaridh Stone (the brother of Liberal Democrat MP Jamie Stone), have a factory at Blarliath Farm, Tain.

Just outside Hill of Fearn near Tain lies the site of the medieval Fearn Abbey.

== Parliamentary burgh ==
Tain was a parliamentary burgh, combined with Dingwall, Dornoch, Kirkwall and Wick in the Northern Burghs constituency of the House of Commons of the Parliament of Great Britain from 1708 to 1801 and of the Parliament of the United Kingdom from 1801 to 1918. The constituency was a district of burghs known also as Tain Burghs until 1832, and then as Wick Burghs. It was represented by one Member of Parliament (MP). In 1918 the constituency was abolished, and Tain was merged into Ross and Cromarty.

== Notable people ==
- Saint Duthac (1000–1065), 11th century saint
- Sir John Fraser (1885–1947), surgeon
- Peter Fraser (1884–1950), 24th prime minister of New Zealand, was born in Hill of Fearn, near Tain.
- George MacKenzie (1886–1957), president of the Institute of Banking, 1941–45
- Rev John Munro of Tain, 17th-century religious dissenter, was a minister here.
- David Robertson (born 1962), former Free Church of Scotland moderator and Christian commentator, grew up in Portmahomack.
- Elizabeth Ness MacBean Ross (1878–1915), physician who was raised here and attended Tain Royal Academy.
- John Ross (1726–1800), merchant during the American Revolution
- Walter Ross Taylor (1805–1896), served as Moderator of the General Assembly to the Free Church of Scotland in 1884.
- Professor Thomas Summers West (1927–2010), an internationally acclaimed analytical chemist, went to school at Tain Royal Academy.

== Climate ==
Tain has an oceanic climate (Köppen: Cfb).

Climate data for Tain Range (4 m or 13 ft asl, averages 1991–2020)
Month	Jan	Feb	Mar	Apr	May	Jun	Jul	Aug	Sep	Oct	Nov	Dec	Year
Record high °C (°F)	16.0 (60.8)	16.6 (61.9)	21.3 (70.3)	23.3 (73.9)	23.8 (74.8)	27.3 (81.1)	27.9 (82.2)	28.6 (83.5)	27.1 (80.8)	21.0 (69.8)	18.0 (64.4)	14.9 (58.8)	28.6 (83.5)
Mean daily maximum °C (°F)	6.6 (43.9)	7.4 (45.3)	9.3 (48.7)	11.6 (52.9)	14.0 (57.2)	16.4 (61.5)	18.4 (65.1)	18.2 (64.8)	16.3 (61.3)	12.7 (54.9)	9.2 (48.6)	6.7 (44.1)	12.3 (54.1)
Daily mean °C (°F)	3.5 (38.3)	3.9 (39.0)	5.5 (41.9)	7.5 (45.5)	9.7 (49.5)	12.5 (54.5)	14.4 (57.9)	14.2 (57.6)	12.3 (54.1)	9.0 (48.2)	5.8 (42.4)	3.4 (38.1)	8.5 (47.3)
Mean daily minimum °C (°F)	0.4 (32.7)	0.5 (32.9)	1.8 (35.2)	3.4 (38.1)	5.5 (41.9)	8.7 (47.7)	10.5 (50.9)	10.2 (50.4)	8.2 (46.8)	5.3 (41.5)	2.4 (36.3)	0.2 (32.4)	4.8 (40.6)
Record low °C (°F)	−12.7 (9.1)	−17.2 (1.0)	−10.1 (13.8)	−7.4 (18.7)	−4.1 (24.6)	−0.2 (31.6)	1.9 (35.4)	0.6 (33.1)	−1.1 (30.0)	−4.4 (24.1)	−7.4 (18.7)	−18.4 (−1.1)	−18.4 (−1.1)
Average precipitation mm (inches)	57.8 (2.28)	51.0 (2.01)	46.1 (1.81)	42.5 (1.67)	51.4 (2.02)	52.9 (2.08)	56.7 (2.23)	57.9 (2.28)	52.8 (2.08)	72.6 (2.86)	59.7 (2.35)	58.7 (2.31)	660.2 (25.99)
Average precipitation days (≥ 1.0 mm)	12.6	11.8	11.5	10.0	11.5	11.0	11.7	11.3	10.4	13.3	13.0	13.2	141.2
Source 1: Met Office
Source 2: Starlings Roost Weather

== Freedom of the Royal Burgh ==
The following people and military units have received the Freedom of the Royal Burgh of Tain.

=== Individuals ===
- Sir Arthur Bignold: 1907.
- Colonel James Alexander Francis Humberston Stewart Mackenzie of Seaforth: 1907
- Sir John Fraser: 1925.
