= Tain Royal Academy =

- Acadamaidh Rìoghail Bhaile Dhubhthaich

Location
- Innis Mhor Road; Tain, IV19 1FH; Scotland; 57.80964°N 4.06781°W°

Information
- Type: Secondary
- Motto: Trust, Respect, Ambition
- Established: 1813; 213 years ago
- Local authority: Highland
- PC Chair: M Fioretti
- Rector: D Jarvie
- Staff: 79
- Age: 12 to 18
- Enrolment: 590
- Houses: Duthus, Garrick, and Struy
- Colours: Green, Yellow and Red
- Website: www.tainroyalacademy.org.uk

Tain Royal Academy is a secondary school in Highland, Scotland. The school first opened in 1813, with a new building opened in 1969 and an educational campus currently being built, due to open in 2026. Tain Royal Academy is part of the Golspie, Invergordon & Tain associated school group, consisting of Golspie High School, Invergordon Academy and Tain.

As of September 2026 it has a school roll of 492 pupils.

== History ==
In 1809 a royal charter was signed by King George III for an academy to be built in Tain. The school opened in 1813. A new school building was opened in 1969, extended in 1978.

A £45 million campus with facilities catering for 3 to 18 year olds is to be located near the existing Tain Royal Academy site. In 2015, these plans were approved by Highland Council and then Scottish Government Ministers. The new campus, eventually costing £72 million, opened to primary pupils in April 2026, with secondary pupils moving to the new building in June 2026.

== Notable former pupils ==
- Dr Robert Cameron MacKenzie FRSE (1920-2000) Head of the Macaulay Institute
- Thomas Summers West, chemist.
- Professor Sir John Fraser Bt.(1885-1947) Surgeon and principal of the University of Edinburgh
